= Rue des Rosiers =

Street in the Pletzl, Paris

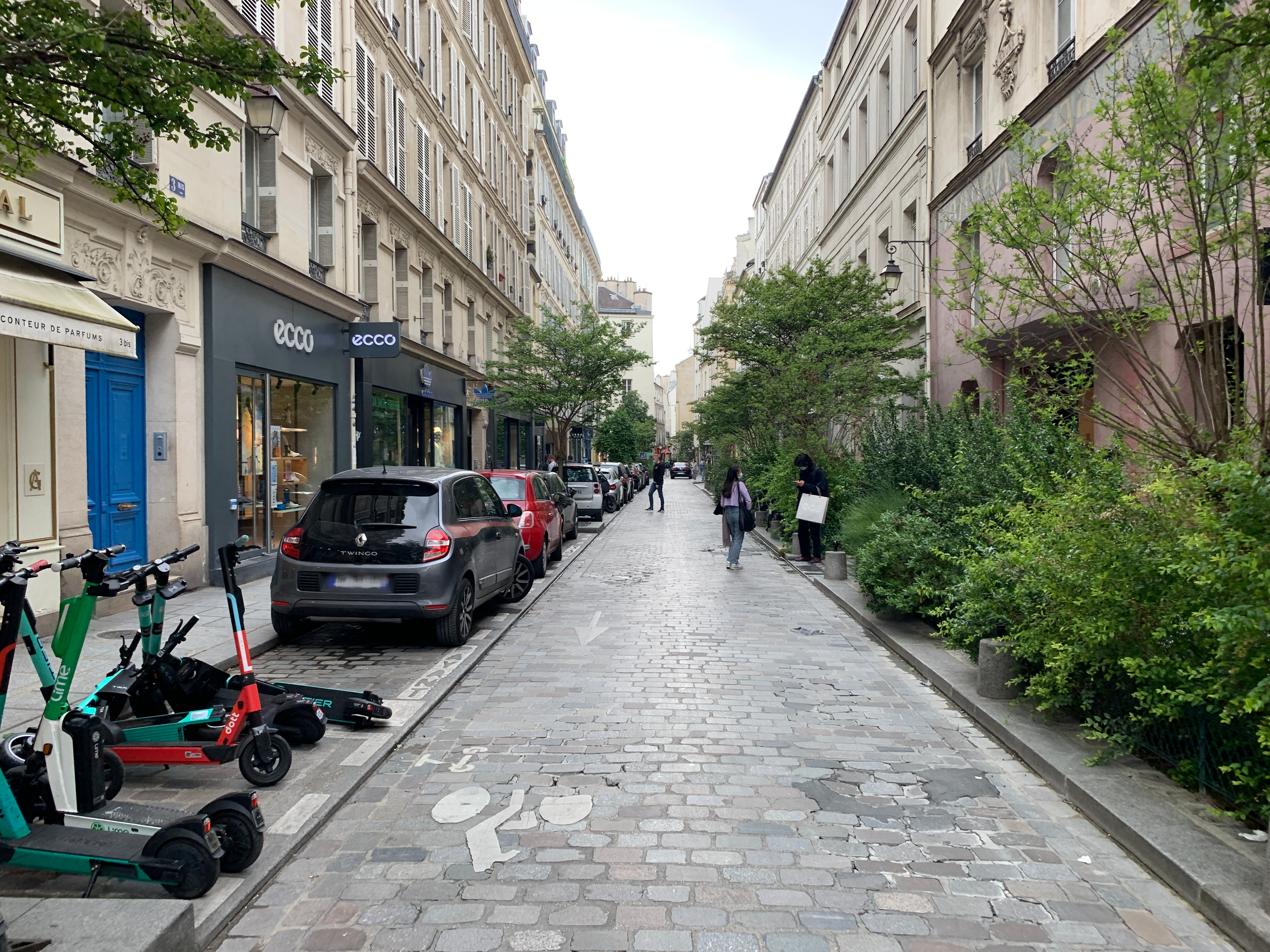
- Rue des Rosiers, seen in 2021 from the eastern side, its most recent part (19th century)

- Location within Paris
- Length: 380 m (1,250 ft)
- Width: 24 m (79 ft)
- Arrondissement: IV^{e}
- Quarter: Saint-Paul Le Marais
- Coordinates: 48°51′25″N 2°21′35″E

Construction
- Completion: Unknown
- Denomination: Rosiers

The Rue des Rosiers (French pronunciation: [ʁy de ʁozje]), which means "street of the rosebushes," is a street in the 4th arrondissement of Paris, France. It begins at the Rue Malher and proceeds northwest across the Rue Pavée, Rue Ferdinand Duval, Rue des Écouffes, and Rue des Hospitalières Saint-Gervais before it ends at the Rue Vieille du Temple.

The Rue des Rosiers lies at the center of the Jewish quarter, unofficially called "the Pletzl" (Yiddish for "little place"). Shopping hours are restricted in Paris, but an exception was granted to this area due to Saturday being the Jewish Sabbath. As a result, cafés and shops are open in this area on Sundays and holidays, which draws large crowds of both Jews and non-Jews.

During the last ten years, the small Jewish shops have been largely crowded out and the Rue des Rosiers has become notable for fashion. The quaint boutiques of days-gone-by have given way to gleaming minimalist showrooms for some of Europe's trendiest labels.

Officially, this street is in the Marais district, which extends along the Rue de Rivoli a short distance away, and some refer to the area as "Saint Paul" because of the proximity of the Place Saint-Paul.

== Métro station ==
The Rue des Rosiers is:

Located near the Metro station: Saint-Paul.

== Notable attractions ==
- No. 4: Former Saint-Paul hammam, built in 1863 (at a time when apartments did not have bathrooms). Sold in 1990, it became a shop whose only reminder of its former purpose is the façade, which still bears the inscription "HAMMAM SAINT-PAUL - SAUNA - PISCINE". Furniture and clothing stores have successively set up shop there.
- No. 17: Synagogue of 17 rue des Rosiers, one of the two synagogues on the street, the other being at no. 25.
- Nos. 32–34: L'As du Fallafel, a popular Kosher Middle Eastern restaurant known for its acclaimed falafel sandwich.
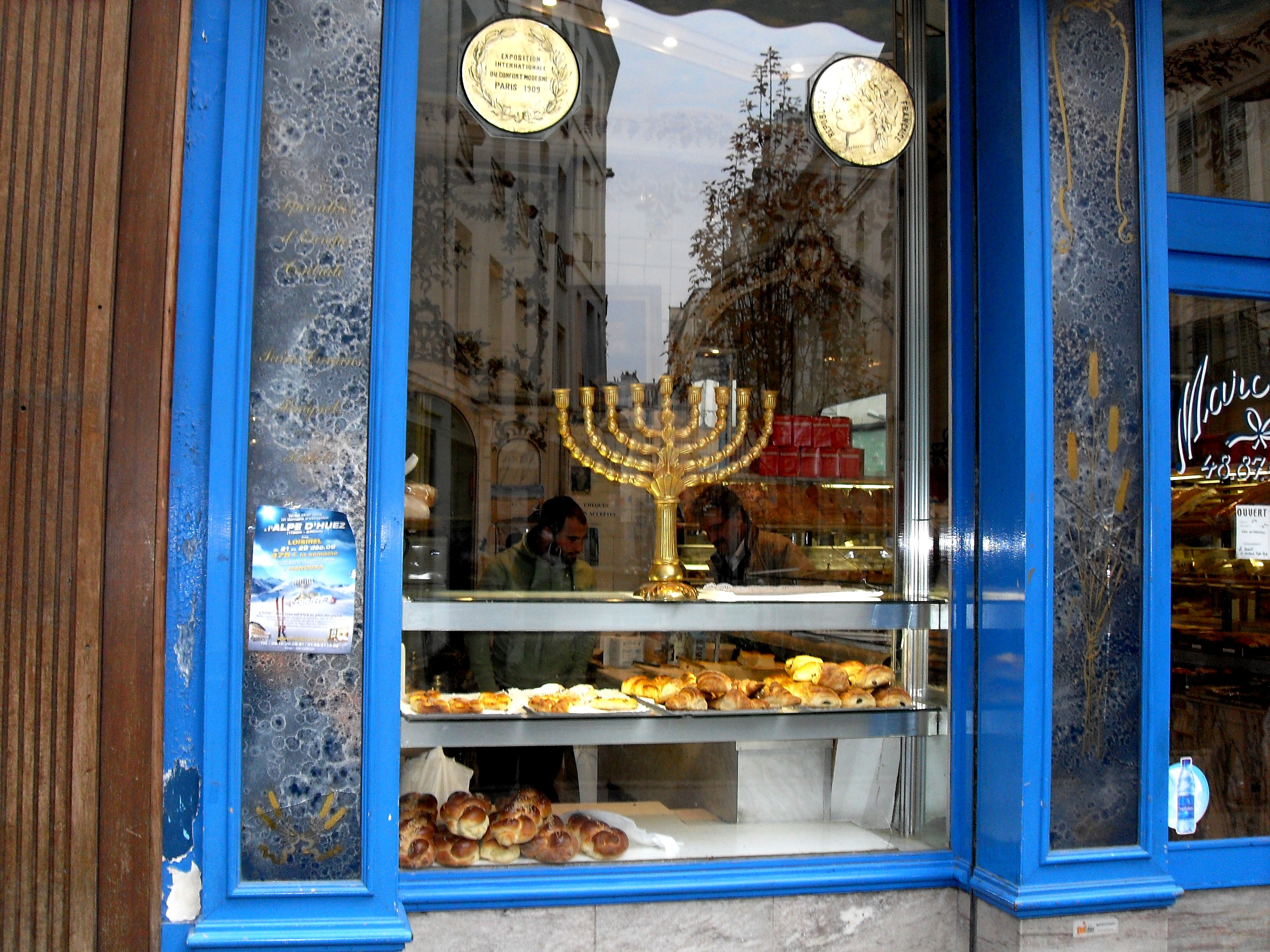
Jewish bakery in the Rue des Rosiers

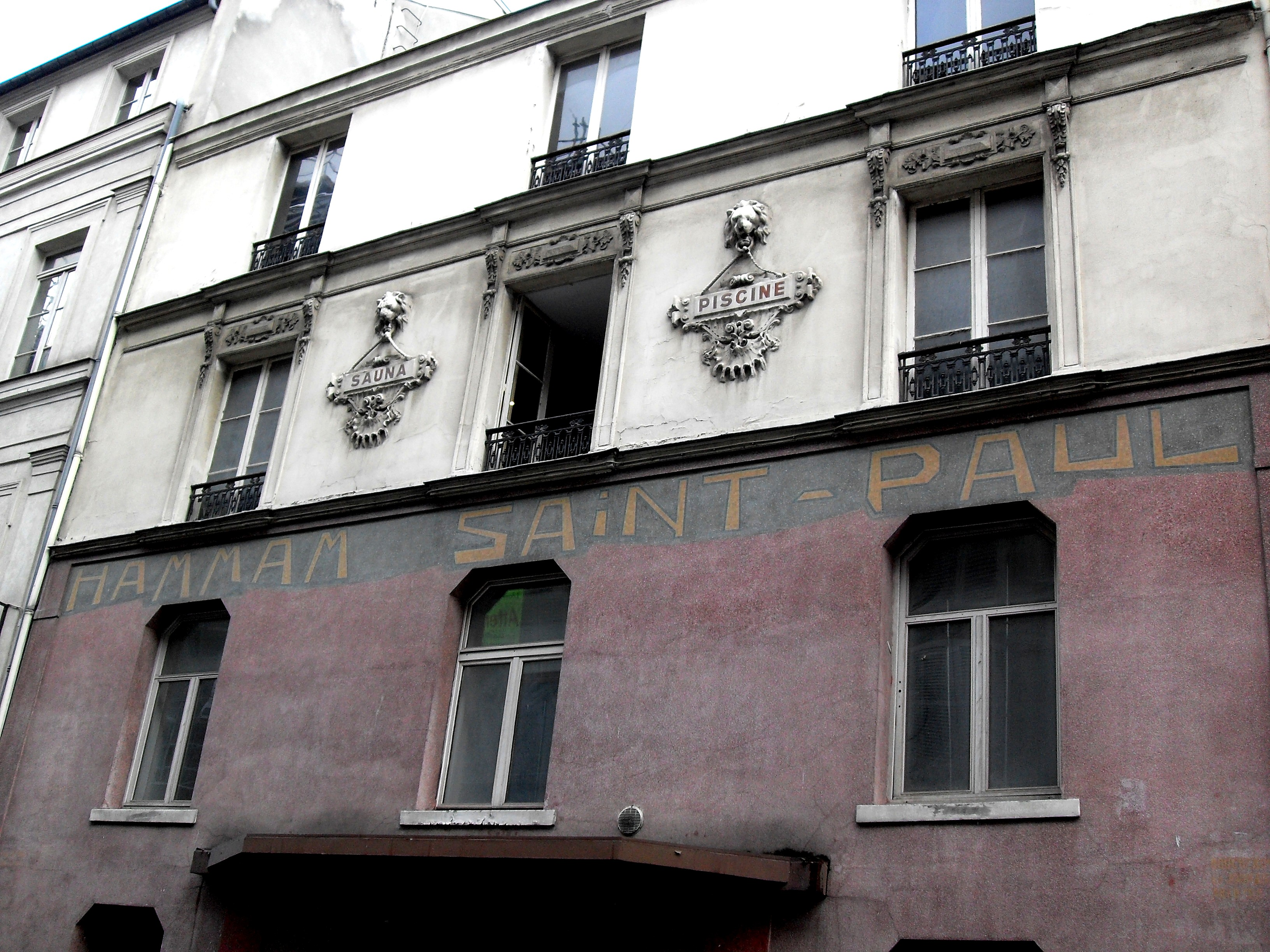
Former Saint-Paul hammam, a communal steambath (schvitz), at no. 3

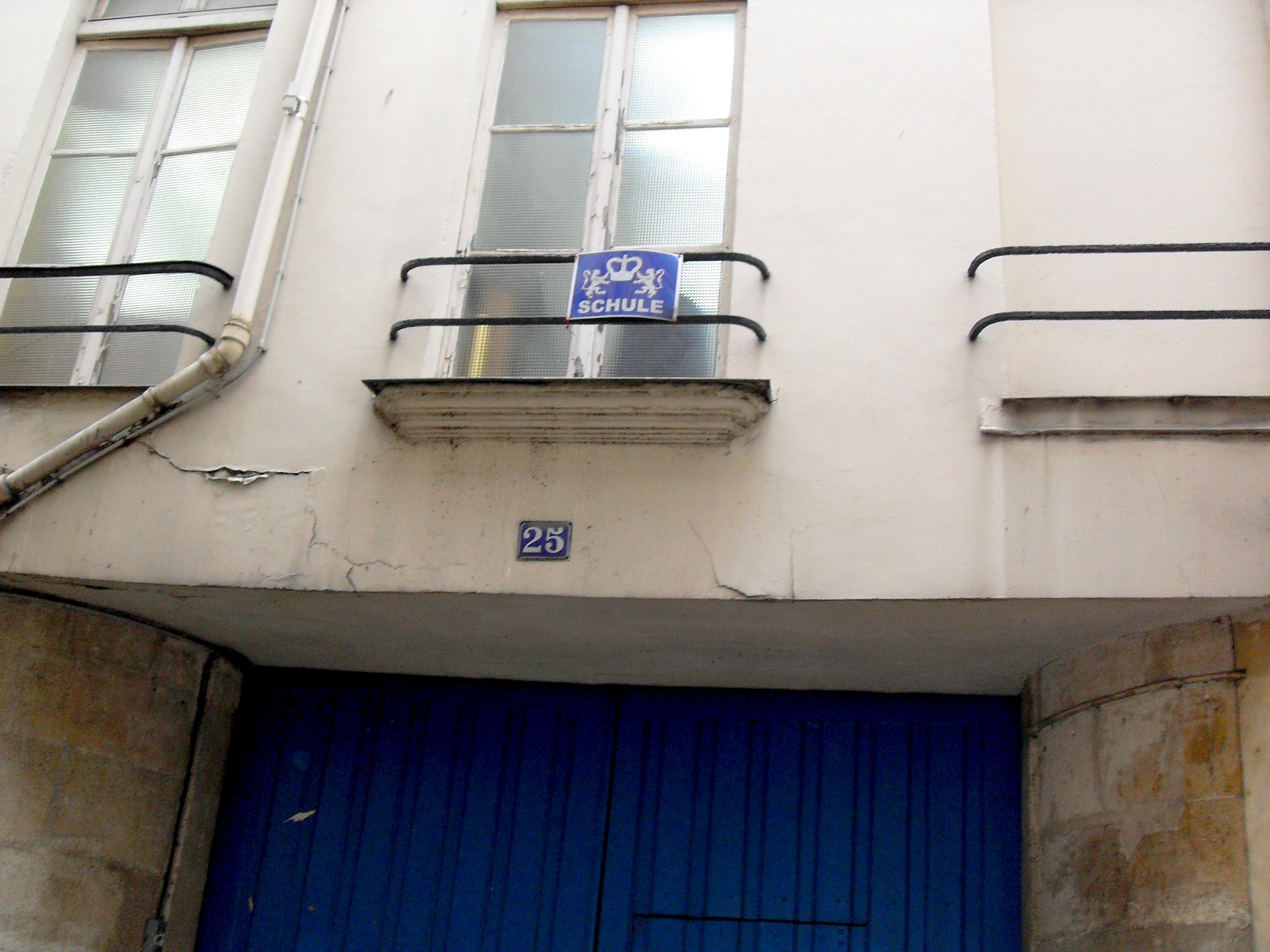
The synagogue at no. 25

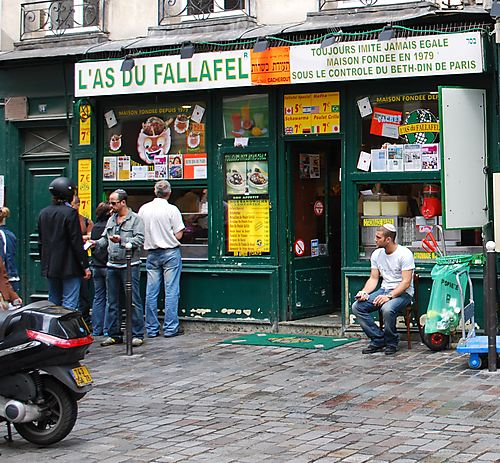
L'As du Fallafel, a popular Kosher restaurant at nos. 32–34

== In popular culture ==
The street is the place of the memorable scene of Rabbi Jacob dance (actually shot in the Rue Jean-Jaurès in Saint-Denis, Seine-Saint-Denis) from the French cult film The Mad Adventures of Rabbi Jacob (1973).
