= Rabbi Jacob dance =

Dance scene from a The Mad Adventures of Rabbi Jacob

Rabbi Jacob dancing

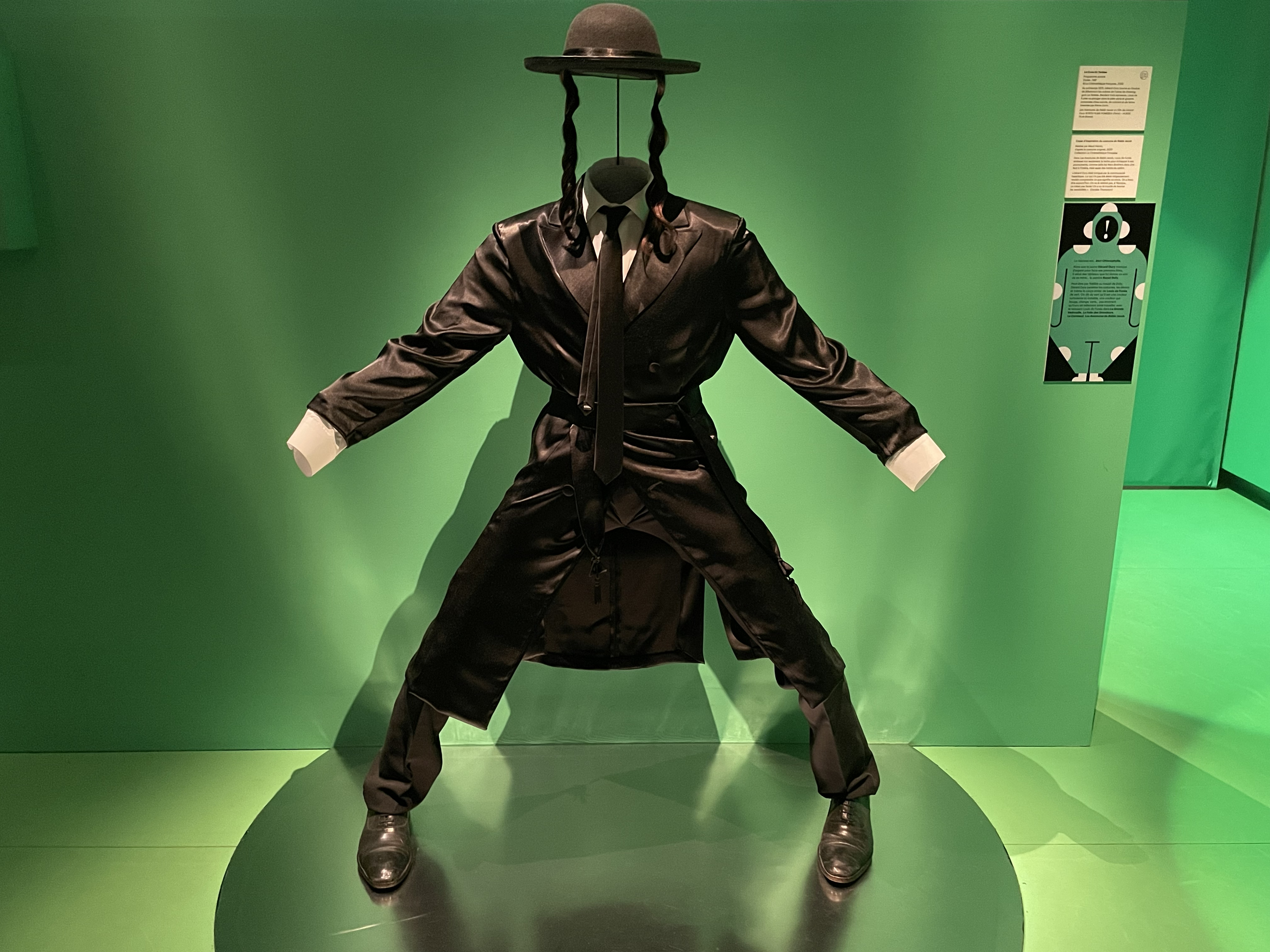
A replica of Rabbi Jacob's costume at the Louis de Funès exposition, Cinémathèque Française

The Rabbi Jacob dance is a memorable scene of the French cult film The Mad Adventures of Rabbi Jacob (1973). Victor Pivert (played by Louis de Funès), an antisemitic and generally bigoted industrialist, is on the run disguised as Rabbi Jacob. He is dragged into a traditional Hasidic dance on the Rue des Rosiers, the central street of Pletzl, the Jewish quarter in Paris and does surprisingly well. The dance scene has gained just as much of a cult status as the film itself and there are numerous videos on the Internet with groups of people dancing it.

The dance was choreographed by French-Israeli choreographer Ilan Zaoui. He founded the company Kol Aviv, for which he choreographed traditional Jewish dances. Initially there was no dance scene planned in the film. Director Gérard Oury wanted to incorporate an element of Jewish tradition and was thinking about Rabbi Jacob playing a violin like a virtuoso, so Zaoui was considered as a musician. However, his choreography caught the attention of the film's team, and one of the dances of the troupe was adapted for the film.

The klezmer music for the dance was written by Philippe Gumplowicz and Vladimir Cosma.

The dance was actually shot in Rue Jean-Jaurès in Saint-Denis, Seine-Saint-Denis, a suburb of Paris. The scenery of Rue des Rosiers was reconstructed in an area which was being demolished at the time. It took 10 days of rehearsals at a studio in Boulogne-Billancourt. Zaoui himself taught de Funès the choreography. He recalls: "It was simply great to work with Louis de Funès. He was an extremely professional and diligent actor. We have created an almost friendly relationship." The general rehearsals took place on the stage of the Gérard Philippe theater in Saint Denis. De Funès commented in relation to this scene: "I have to dance as well as the Jewish dancers. The comic effect does not come from the ridiculousness, on the contrary!". Vladimir Cosma remembers: "I rehearsed with him for several weeks at home at the piano. I saw a very serious gentleman, diligently repeating the dance steps, without any fantasy. I wondered how he could make people laugh. The day I saw him shoot the scene, I couldn't believe it. Having mastered the technique of his steps, he became uninhibited and with each take was bringing new gags with incredible spontaneity and fluidity."

In 2018, a flash mob of 100 at the Place de la République in Lille performed the dance under the guidance of Zaoui. A similar flash mob of 200 gathered in 2019 in Paris to celebrate the 105th anniversary of Louis de Funès.
