= Place des Combattantes-et-Combattants-du-Sida =

Square in Paris, France

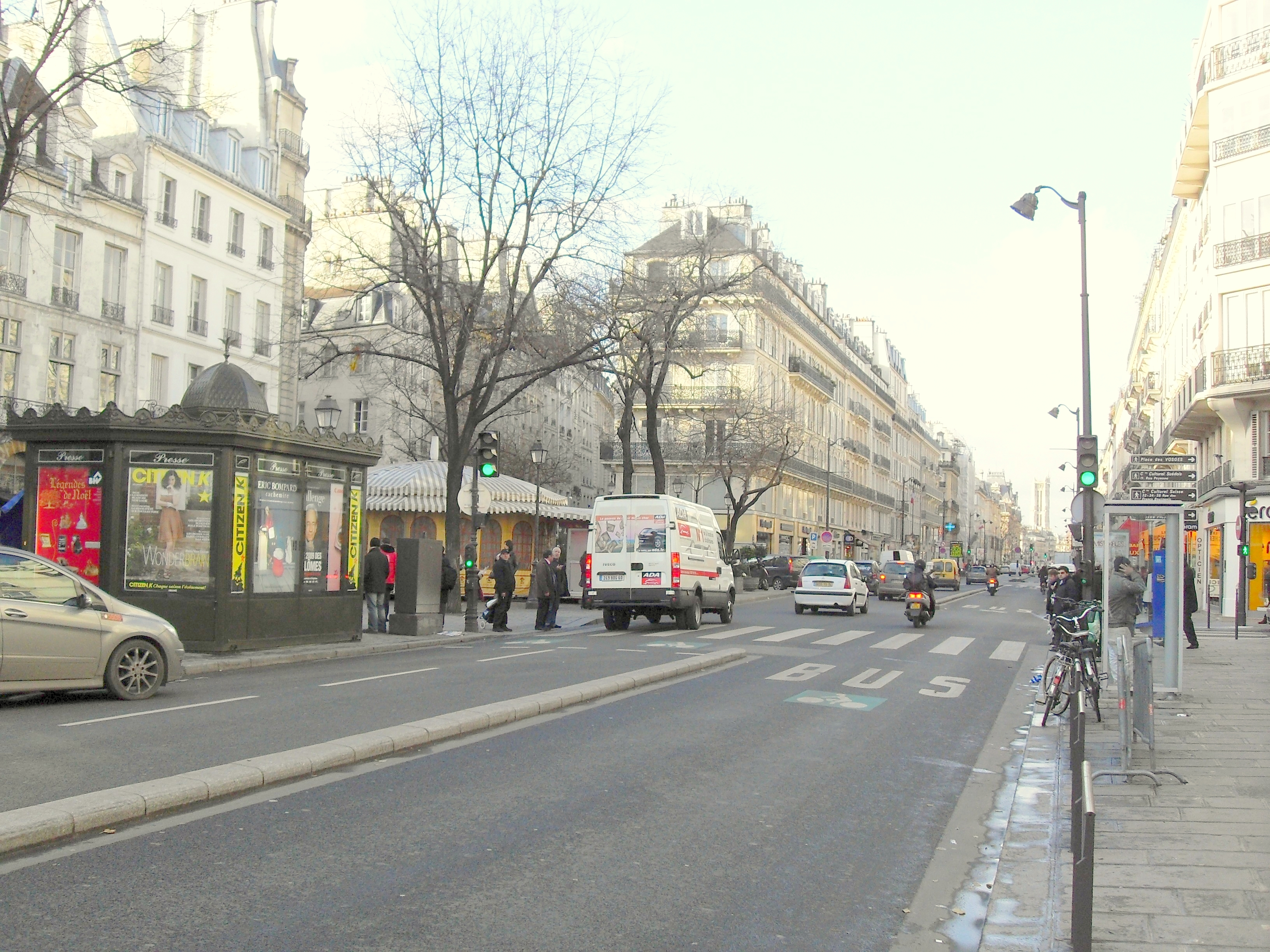
- The Place Saint-Paul along the Rue de Rivoli

- Location within Paris
- Length: 125 m (410 ft)
- Width: 125 m (410 ft)
- Arrondissement: 4th
- Quarter: Le Marais . Pletzl
- Coordinates: 48°51′19″N 2°21′37″E

Construction
- Completion: 1854
- Denomination: Saint-Paul

The Place des Combattantes-et-Combattants-du-Sida is a public square in the 4th arrondissement of Paris near the Saint-Paul metro station and the Église Saint-Paul-Saint-Louis.

== Origin of the name ==
Until 2021, the central strip facing the Église Saint-Paul-Saint-Louis had no official name, although it was customary to call it the Place Saint-Paul. Both the "square" and the metro station take their names from the local church, the Église Saint-Paul-Saint-Louis. The area is also called "Métro Saint-Paul". A hotel nearby, perhaps acknowledging the unofficial nature of the "Place Saint-Paul" name, calls itself "Hôtel de la Pointe Rivoli".

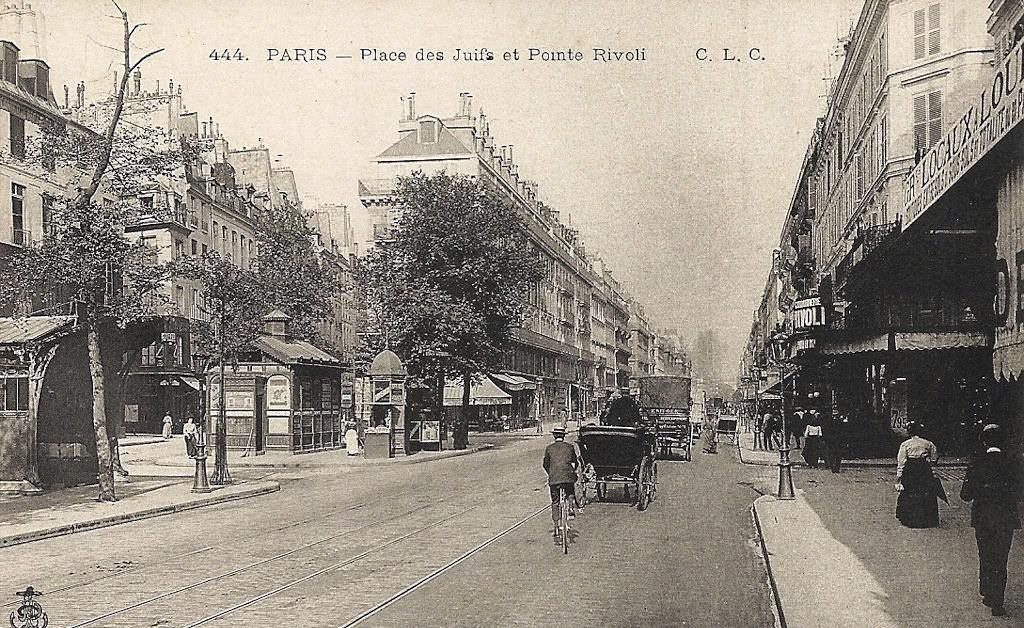
Postcard dating from the beginning of the 20th century, captioned "Place des Juifs and Pointe Rivoli"

Since November 2021, the square has been paying tribute to people who fought against AIDS, that is to say, those who died and were sick from HIV, as well as healthcare workers and activists.

Old postcards representing places in the Place Saint-Paul area are sometimes captioned Place des Juifs (Square of the Jews). The neighboring Jewish quarter (Rue des Rosiers, Rue Ferdinand-Duval, etc.) is called the Pletzl, (פלעצל, "little place" in Yiddish.) The "little place", which lent its name to an entire neighborhood, is also often identified as the "Place Saint-Paul".

== Location and access ==
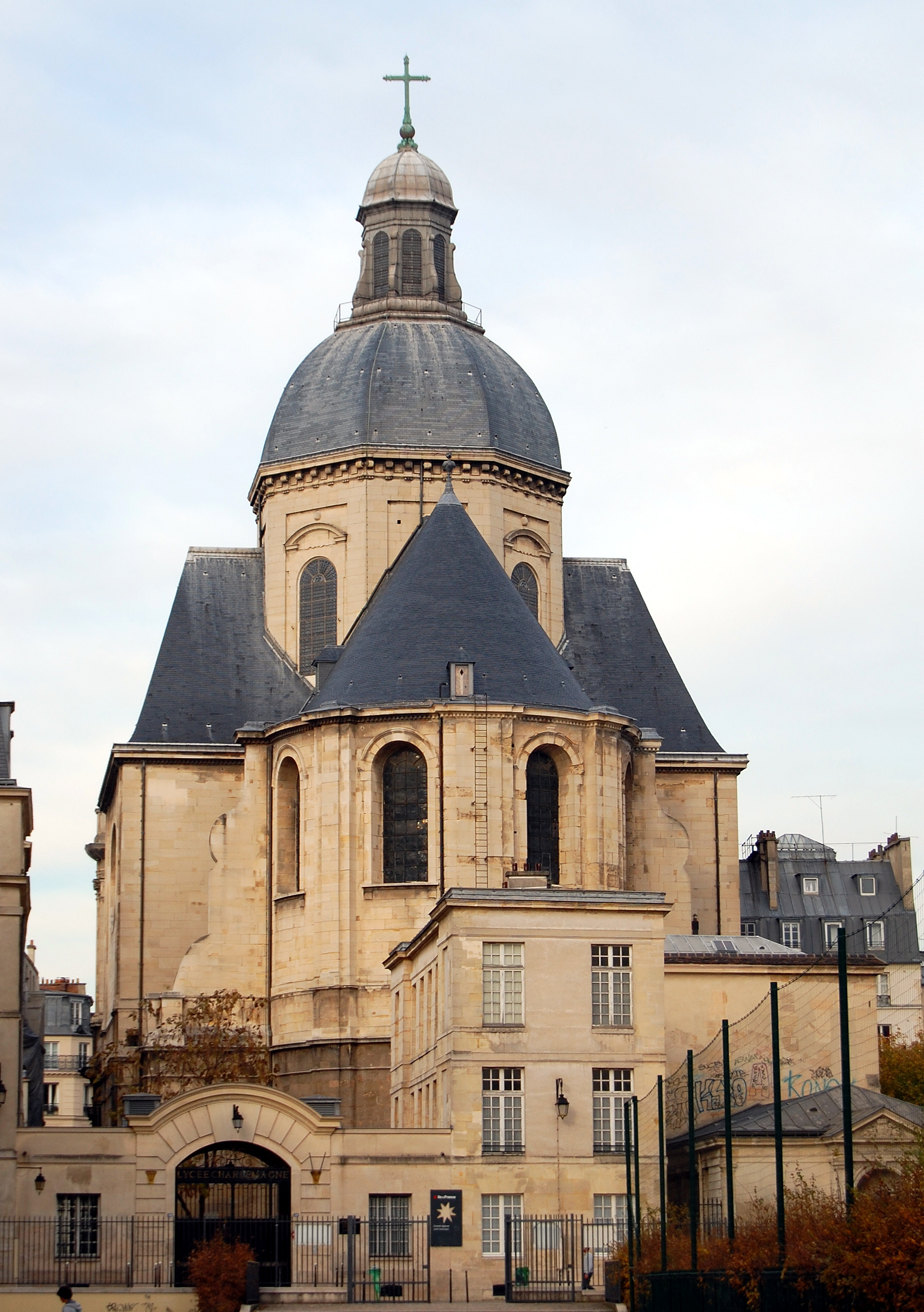
Église Saint-Paul-Saint-Louis

At the square, almost in front of the church's north-facing doors, the Rue Saint-Antoine meets the Rue de Rivoli at a narrow angle, forming a triangular island to the west of the intersection where there are trees, benches, kiosks, an entrance to the Saint-Paul metro station, a carousel for children, etc.

The portions of the streets closest to the Rivoli/Saint-Antoine intersection include the Rue Saint-Paul, Rue de Turenne, Rue de Sévigné, Rue Malher, Rue du Roi de Sicile, Rue Pavée, Rue Francois Miron, Rue de Fourcy, and Rue de Prévôt.

== History ==
The triangular area described above, planted with two rows of trees, has existed since the extension of the Rue de Rivoli from the ancient Place du Marché-Saint-Jean, which is known today as the Place du Bourg-Tibourg, to the Rue Saint-Antoine undertaken by Baron Haussmann in 1854.

As for the metro station, it was among the stops on the first section of Line 1 of the metro system, which opened on 19 July 1900, as part of a new service operating between Porte Maillot and the Porte de Vincennes.

== Metro station ==
The Place Saint-Paul is:

| Located near the Metro station: Saint-Paul. |

It is served by line 1.

== See also ==
- Pletzl
- Saint-Paul (Paris Métro)
- Squares in Paris
