= Hôtel de Ville station =

Metro station in Paris, France

Hôtel de Ville
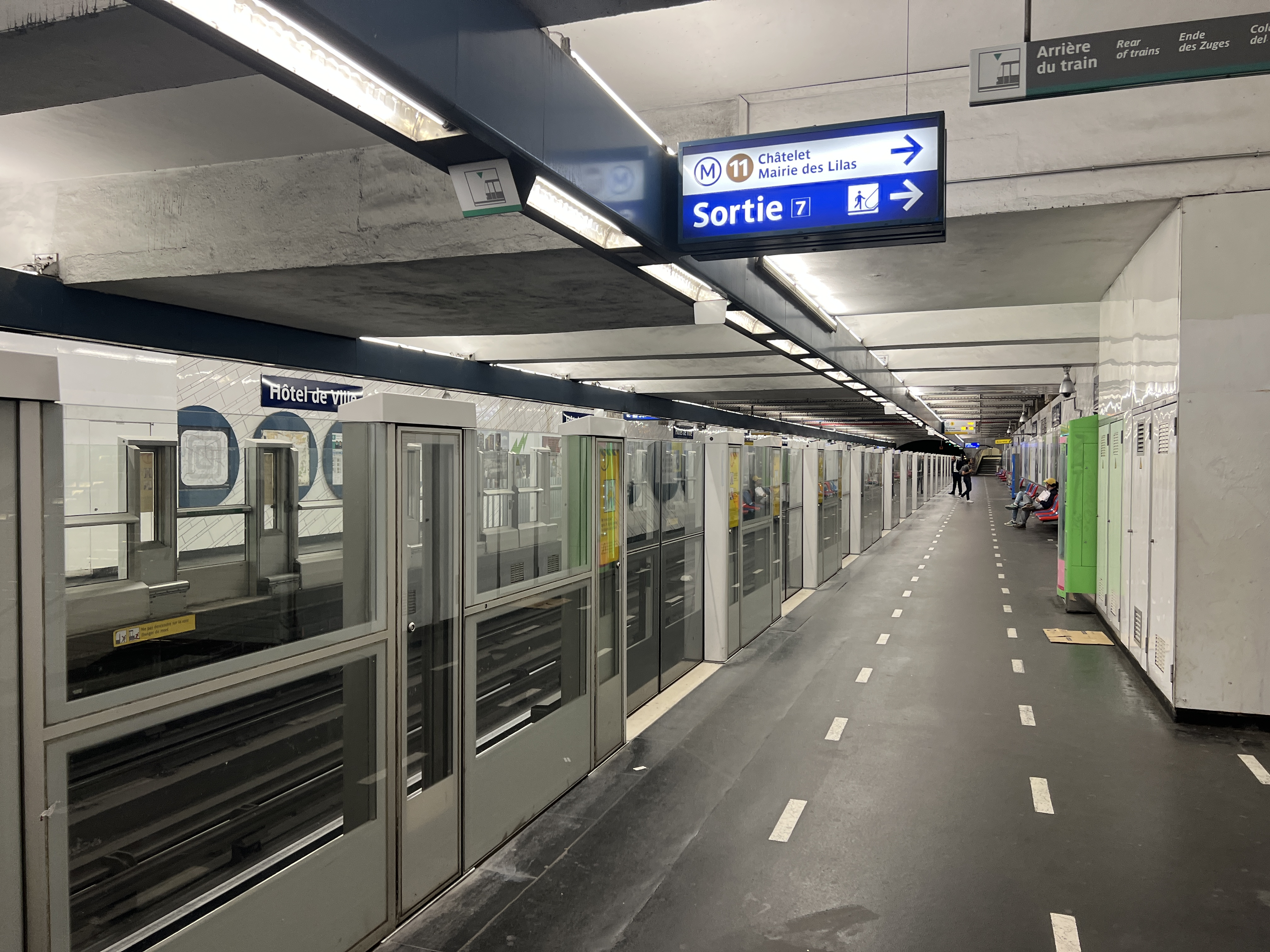
- Line 1 platforms

General information
- Location: 31, rue de Rivoli; 70, rue de Rivoli; 9, pl. de l'Hôtel de Ville; 5, rue Lobau; 4th arrondissement of Paris; Île-de-France; France
- Coordinates: 48°51′27″N 2°21′05″E
- Owner: RATP
- Operator: RATP
- Line: Paris Metro Paris Metro Line 1 Paris Metro Line 11
- Platforms: 4 side platforms
- Tracks: 2

Other information
- Station code: 01-15
- Fare zone: 1

History
- Opened: 19 July 1900 (Line 1); 28 April 1935 (Line 11)

Passengers
- 5,673,100 (2020)

Services
Preceding station	Paris Metro	Following station
Châtelet towards La Défense	Line 1	Saint-Paul towards Château de Vincennes
Châtelet Terminus	Line 11	Rambuteau towards Rosny–Bois-Perrier
Route map
Line 1
Line 11
Location
- Location within Paris

Hôtel de Ville (French pronunciation: [otɛl də vil], literally "City Hall") is a rapid transit station on lines 1 and 11 of the Paris Metro. It is named after the nearby Hôtel de Ville (City Hall) and is located within the fourth arrondissement of Paris.

== History ==
Hôtel de Ville is one of the eight original stations opened as part of the first stage of line 1 between Porte de Vincennes and Porte Maillot on 19 July 1900. The line 11 platforms opened as part of the original section of the line from Châtelet to Porte des Lilas on 28 April 1935. During the same decade, the platforms of line 1 were extended to 105 metres to cater for 7-car trains which ultimately did not materialise.

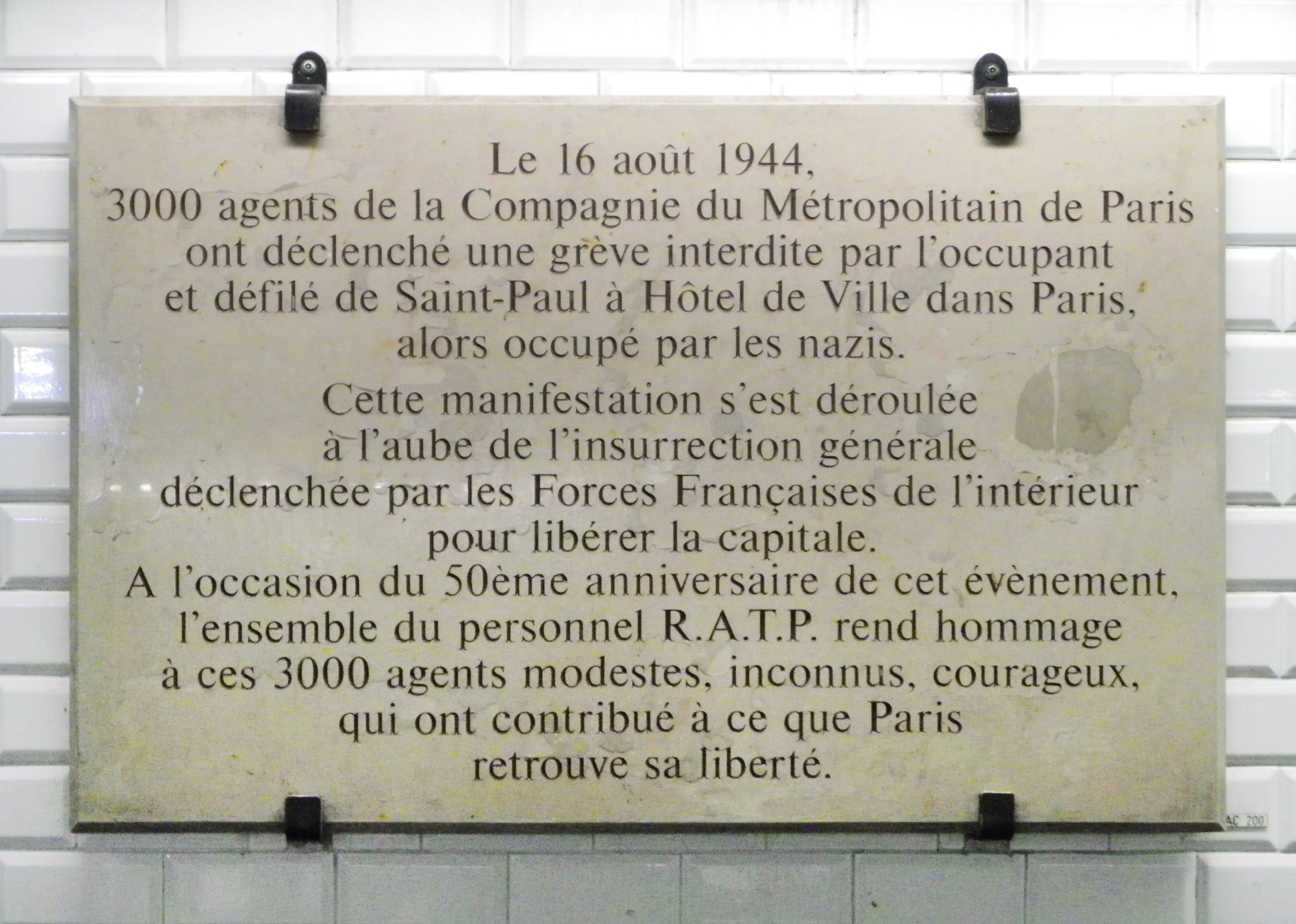

A plaque near the platforms of line 1 marks the 50th anniversary of the strike organised by 3,000 employees of the Compagnie du chemin de fer métropolitain de Paris (CMP), the operator of the métro then, on 16 August 1944 against the Nazis during the occupation of Paris and was triggered by the French Forces to liberate the capital.

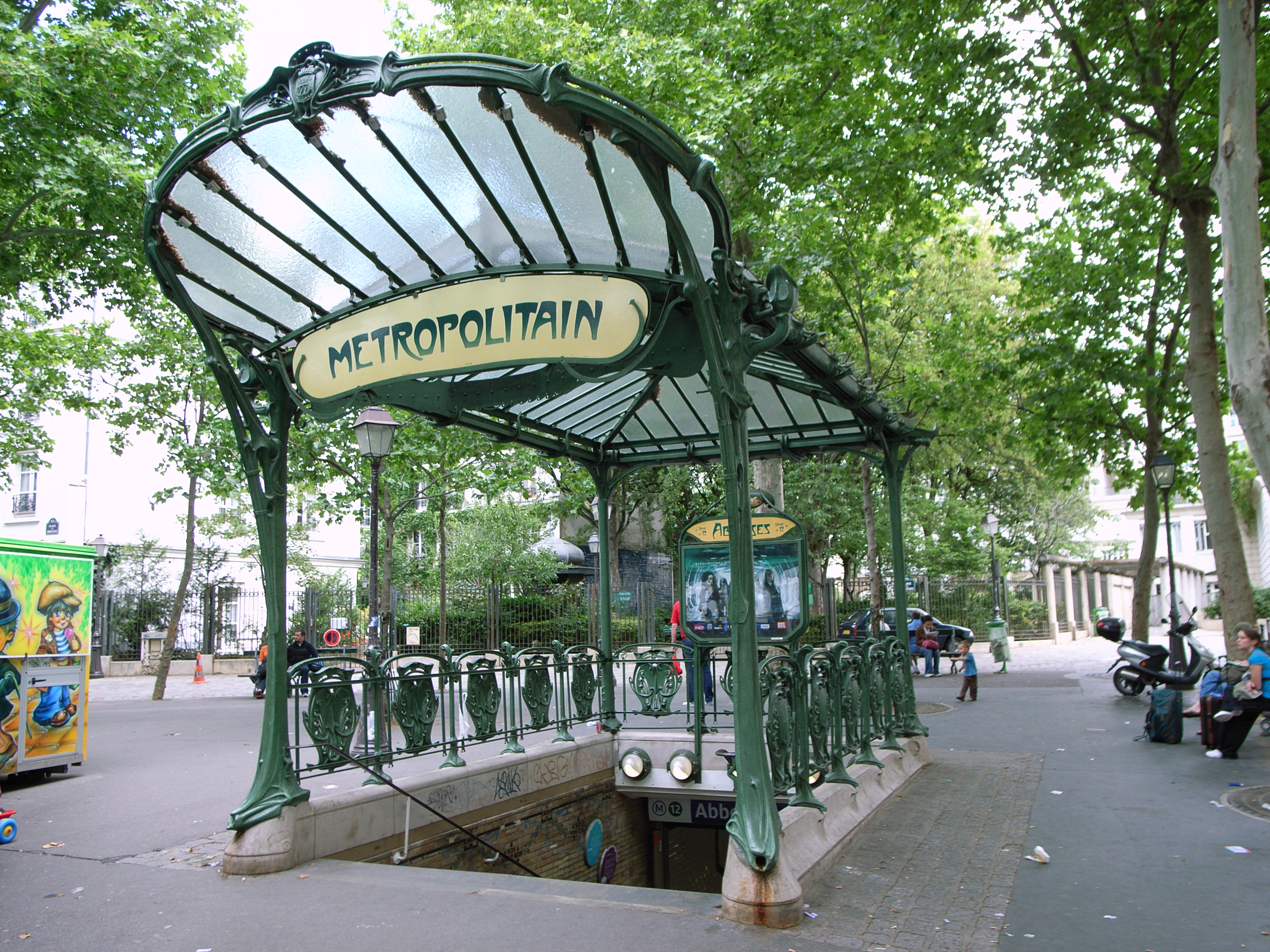
Guimard entrance originally at Hôtel de Ville, now at Abbesses

In 1974, the original Guimard entrance at rue de Lobau was moved to Abbesses, and is one of the only two remaining glass-covered "dragonfly" entrances, known as édicules (the other is at Porte Dauphine). It was listed as a historical monument on 25 July 1965.

As part of the Un métro + beau programme by the RATP, the platforms of line 11 were renovated and modernised on 2005.

During the automation of line 1, the platforms of line 1 had undergone a series of upgrades. Over the weekend of 21–22 March 2009, its platforms were closed to raise its platform levels for the installation platform edge doors to improve passenger safety and for automation which were done in April 2010. During the construction period, the platforms of line 11 remained open, allowing for westward travel to Châtelet, where a transfer to line 1 was possible. The line was fully automated in December 2012.

As part of modernization works for the extension of Line 11 to Rosny–Bois-Perrier in 2023 for the Grand Paris Express, the station was closed from 8 September 2018 to 12 October 2018 to raise its platform levels and its surface tiled to accommodate the new rolling stock that will be used (MP 14) to accommodate the expected increase in passengers and to improve the station's accessibility. From 18 March 2019 to 16 December 2019, the station acted as line 11's western terminus when its original terminus, Châtelet, was closed for 9 months to lengthen the platforms to cater for 5-car trains as it could only cater for 4 at the time. Hence, trains arrived and departed from the western platform, usually used for trains heading to Châtelet, with the other platform temporarily not in use. On 11 December 2020, an additional entrance was opened at rue du Temple.

In 2019, the station was used by 12 307 363 passengers, making it the 11th busiest of the Metro network out of 302 stations.

In 2020, the station was used by 5,673,100 passengers amidst the COVID-19 pandemic, making it the 13th busiest of the Metro network out of 305 stations.

== Passenger services ==
=== Access ===
The station has 7 entrances:

- Entrance 1: rue de Rivoli
- Entrance 2: rue du Renard
- Entrance 3: rue de la Coutellerie
- Entrance 4: avenue Victoria
- Entrance 5: Hôtel de Ville
- Entrance 6: rue de Lobau
- Entrance 7: rue du Temple

=== Station layout ===
G	Street Level	Exit/Entrance
B1	Mezzanine
B2	Side platform with PSDs, doors will open on the right
B2	Westbound	← toward La Défense (Châtelet)
B2	Eastbound	toward Château de Vincennes (Saint-Paul) →
B2	Side platform with PSDs, doors will open on the right
B3	Side platform, doors will open on the right
B3	Southbound	← toward Châtelet (Terminus)
B3	Northbound	toward Rosny–Bois-Perrier (Rambuteau) →
B3	Side platform, doors will open on the right

=== Platforms ===
Both have a standard configuration with two tracks surrounded by two side platforms.

The station of line 1 is established at ground level. The ceiling is made of a metal deck, whose beams, painted white for the most part, are supported by vertical walls. However, the western extension of the station built in the 1930s for a hypothetical switch from the line to seven-car trains (eventually abandoned), has a reinforced concrete ceiling, also painted white. A fresco bringing together all the cultural descriptions is presented on them. It was regularly replaced by thematic or topical frescoes. This cultural development is combined with a specific variation of the Andreu-Motte style in the colours of the city of Paris with two blue light bars and "shell" seats, typical of the Motte style, red and blue. White flat tiles of varying sizes cover the walks in an inclined and staggered arrangement, as well as the tunnel exits, where they are placed vertically and aligned. The name of the station was inscribed in blue capital letters on protruding transparent plates until 2018 when these were replaced by enamelled plaques in Parisine font. The platforms are equipped with half-height platform screen doors and are free of advertising.

On line 11, the vault is elliptical. The decoration is in the style used for the majority of metro stations. The lighting canopies are white and rounded in the Gaudin style of the Renouveau du métro of the 2000s, and the beveled white ceramic tiles cover the walls, the vault and the tunnel exits. The advertising frames are made of honey-coloured earthenware with vegetable motifs, and the name of the station is also incorporated into the earthenware in the interwar style of the original Compagnie du chemin de fer métropolitain de Paris. The platforms are tiled in anthracite grey and the seats, in the Motte style, are blue.

=== Other connections ===
The station is also served by lines 38, 67, 69, 70, 72, 74, 76, and 96 of the RATP bus network, and at night, by lines N11, N16, and N21 Noctilien bus network.

== Nearby ==
- Bazar de l'Hôtel de Ville
- Hôtel de ville de Paris
- Mairie du 4^{e} arrondissement

== Gallery ==
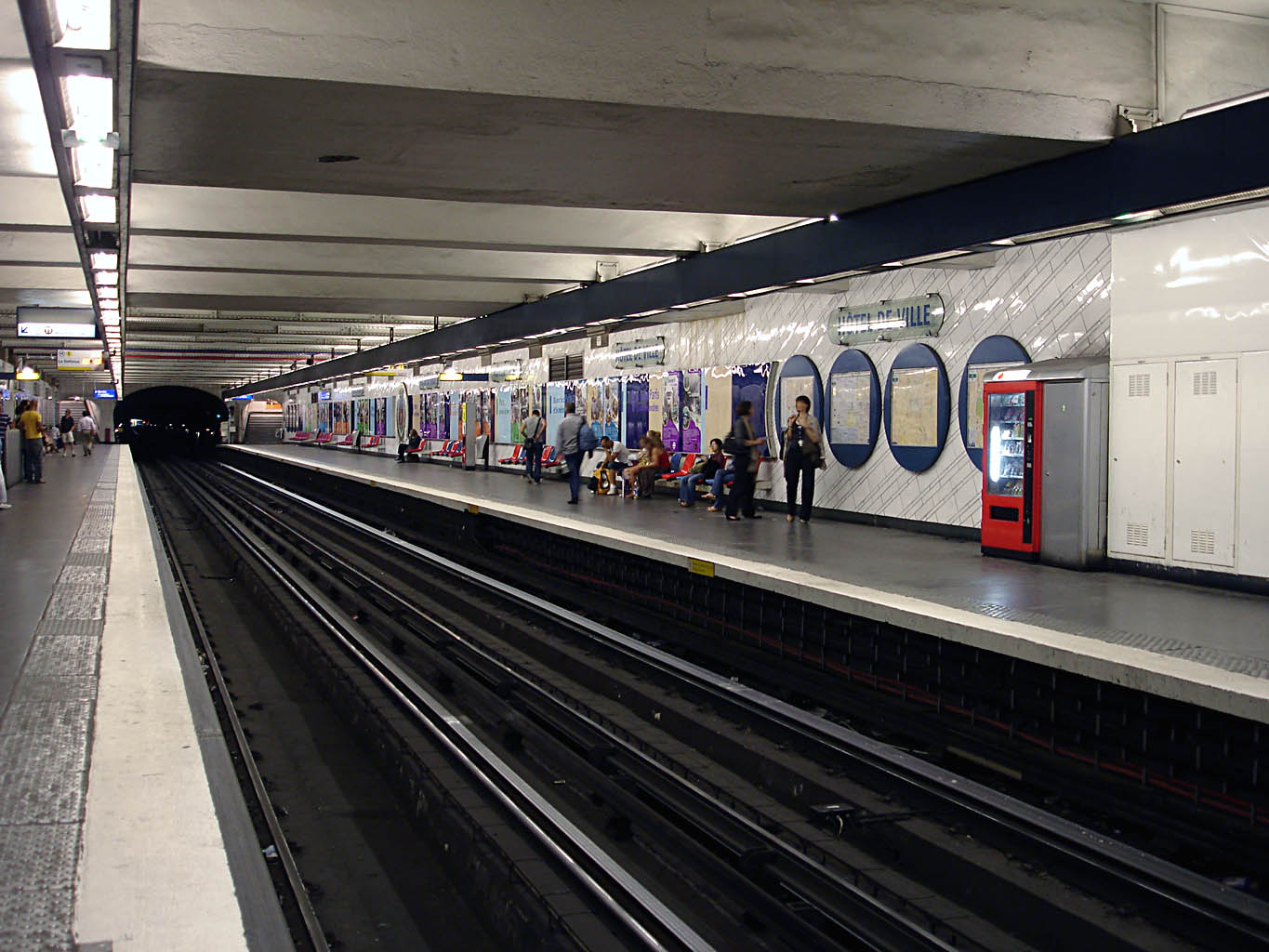
Line 1 platforms prior to automation

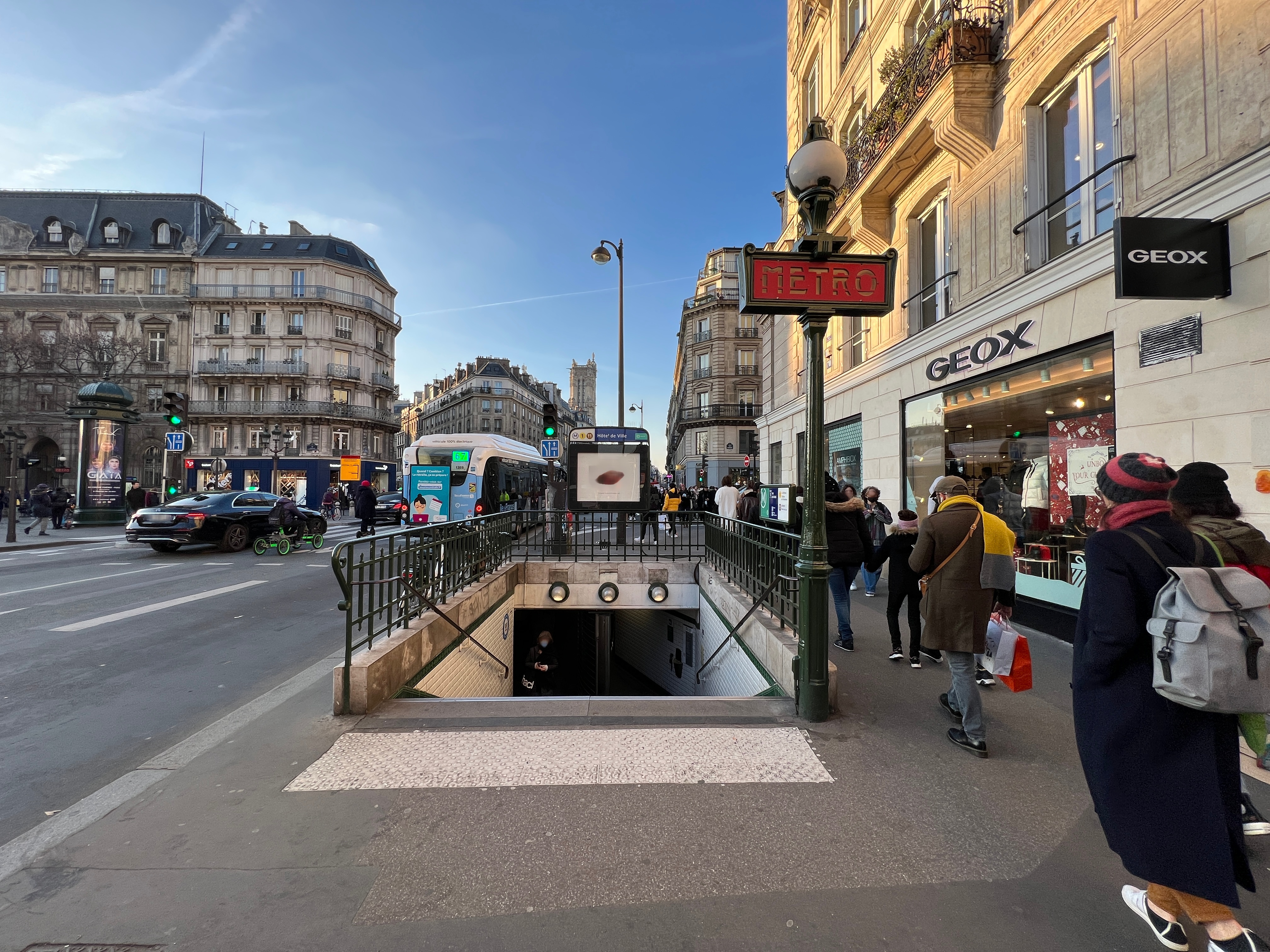
Entrance 1

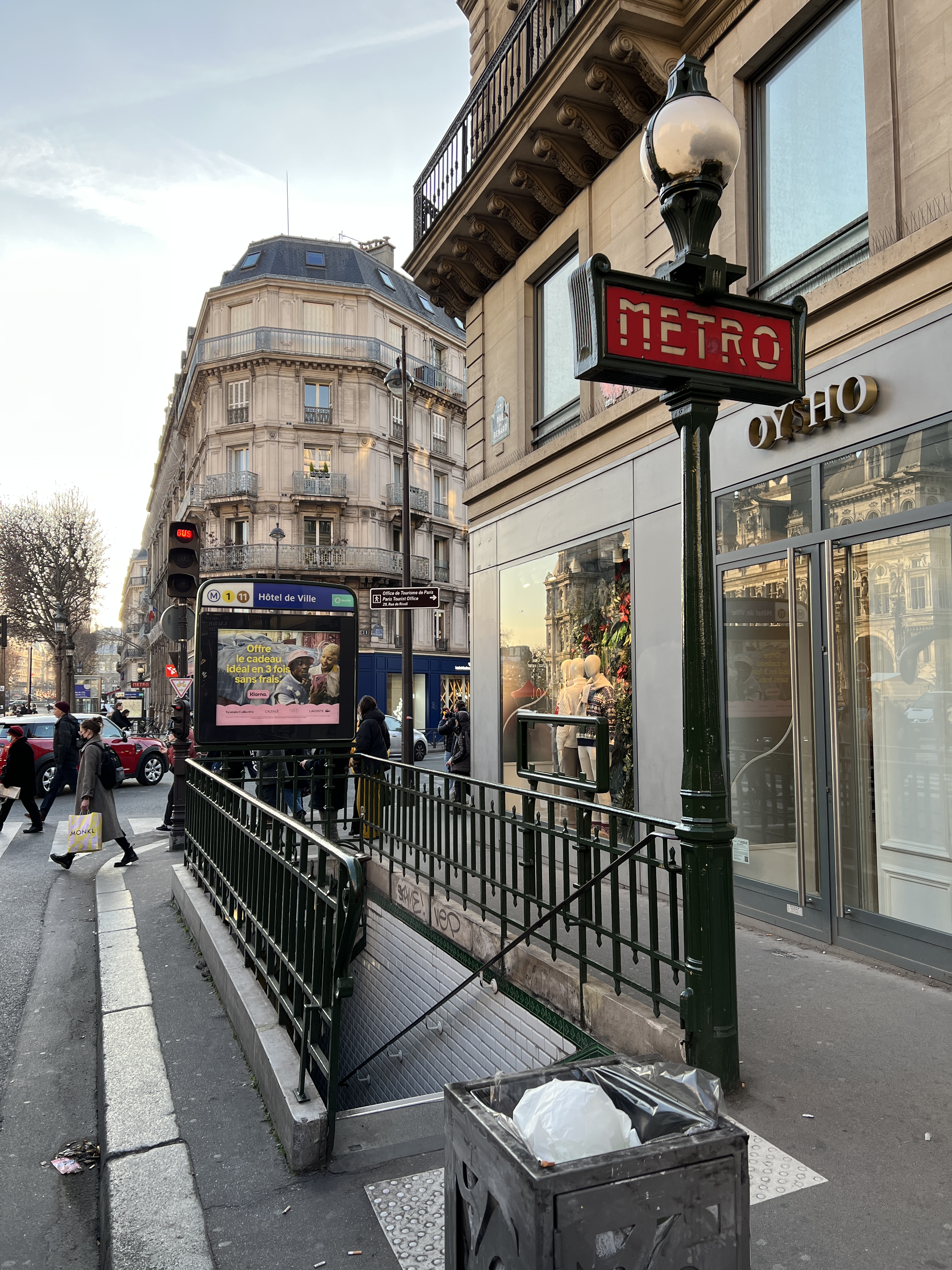
Entrance 2

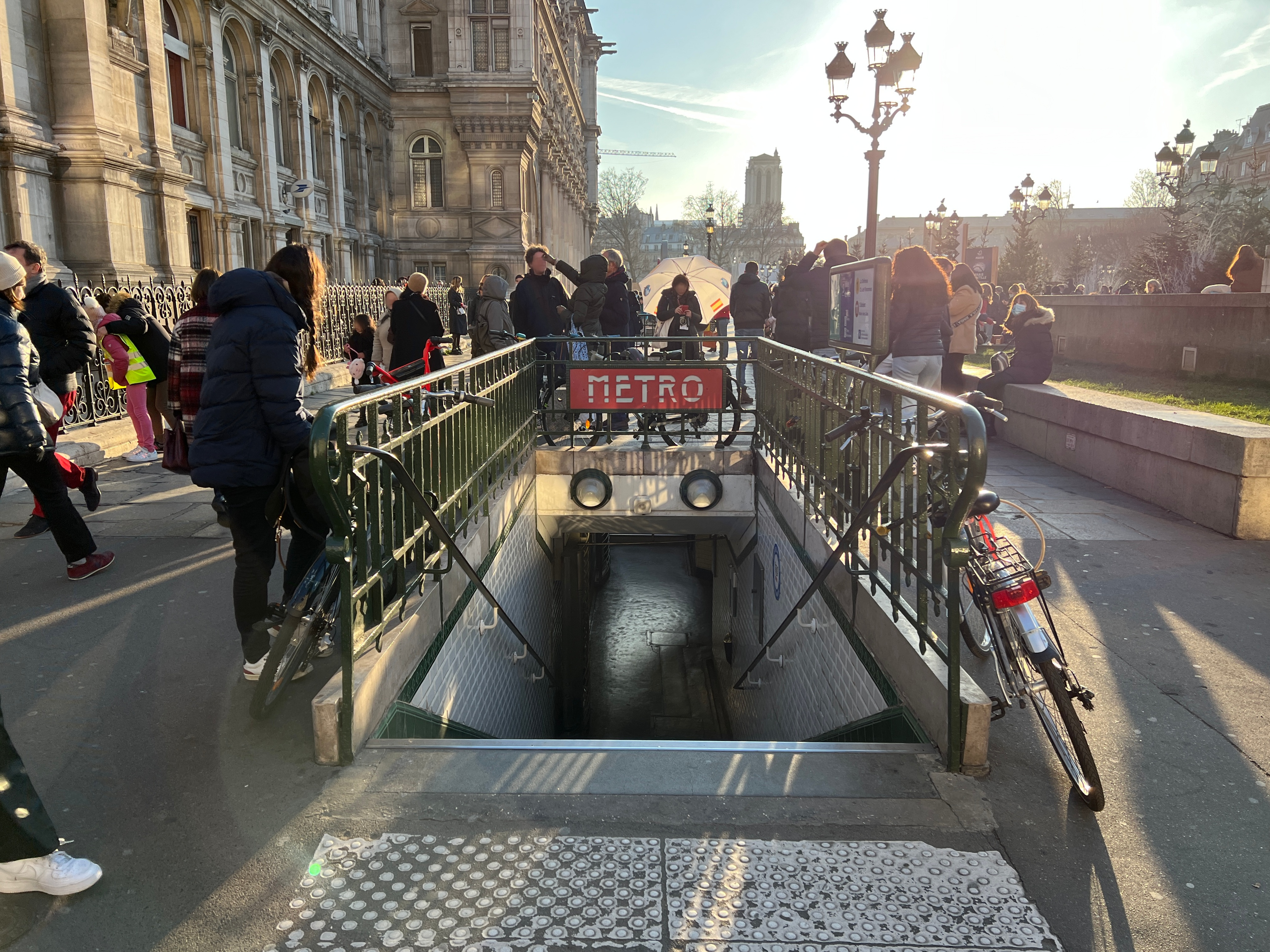
Entrance 5

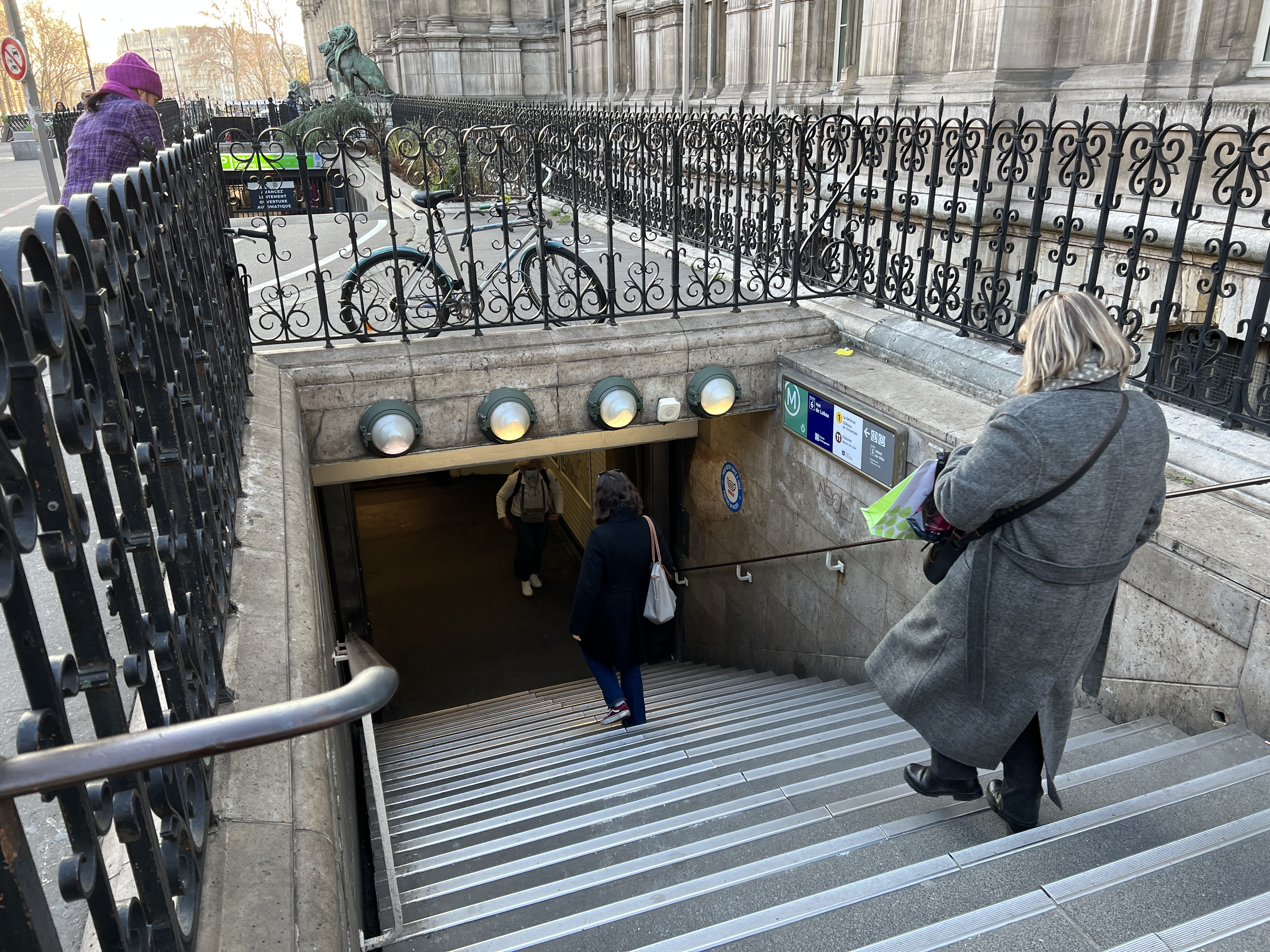
Entrance 6

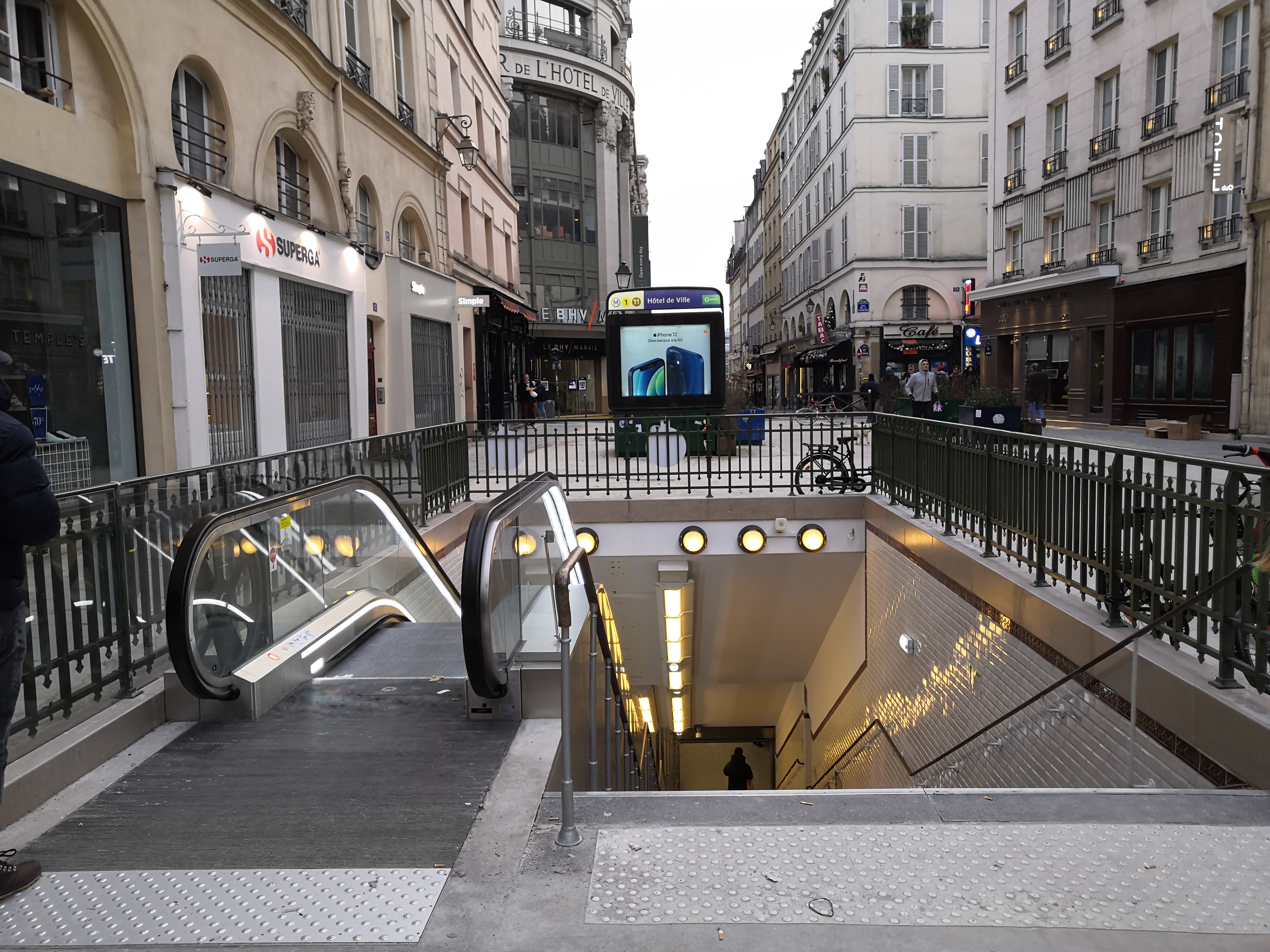
Entrance 7

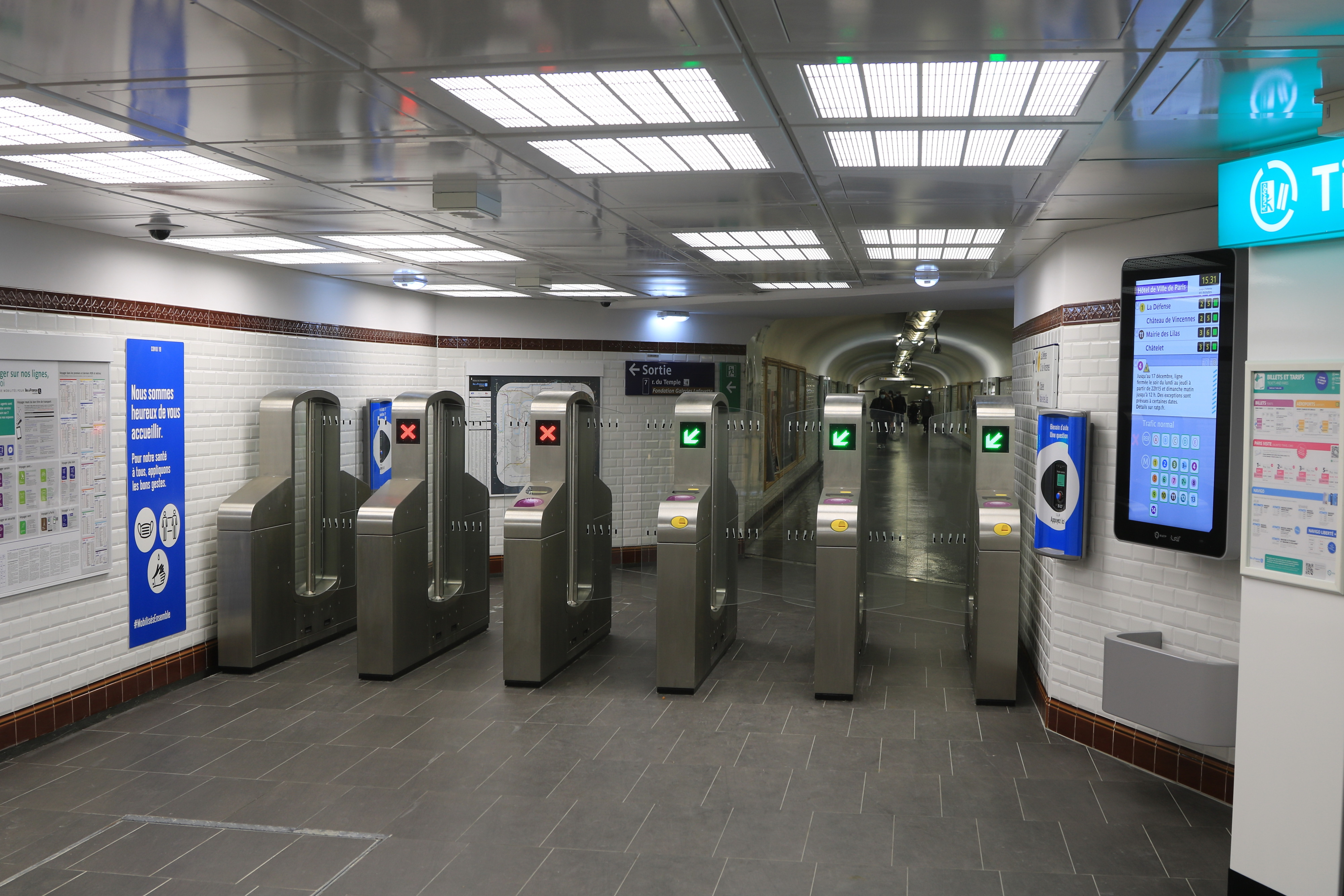
Mezzanine leading to entrance 7

== See also ==
- List of Paris Metro stations
