= L'As du Fallafel =

Restaurant in Paris, France

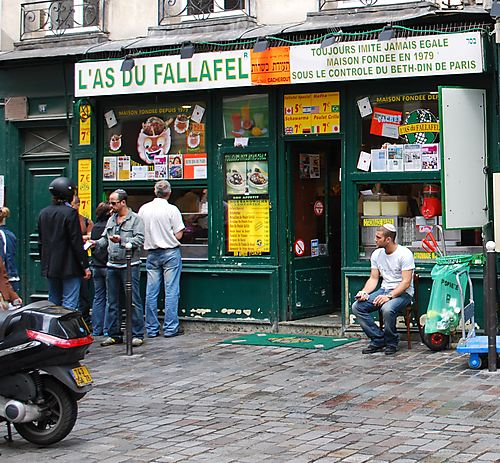
- L'As du Fallafel restaurant in Paris, France

- Location within Paris

Restaurant information
- Food type: Kosher Middle Eastern
- Location: 34, rue des Rosiers, in the "Pletzl" Jewish quarter of Le Marais neighbourhood, Paris, France
- Coordinates: 48.857425°N 2.359072°E

L'As du Fallafel (English: The Ace of Falafel) is a kosher Middle Eastern restaurant located at 34, Rue des Rosiers in the "Pletzl" Jewish quarter of the Le Marais neighborhood in Paris, France. The restaurant is acclaimed for its falafel sandwich served with eggplant and hummus.

== The restaurant ==
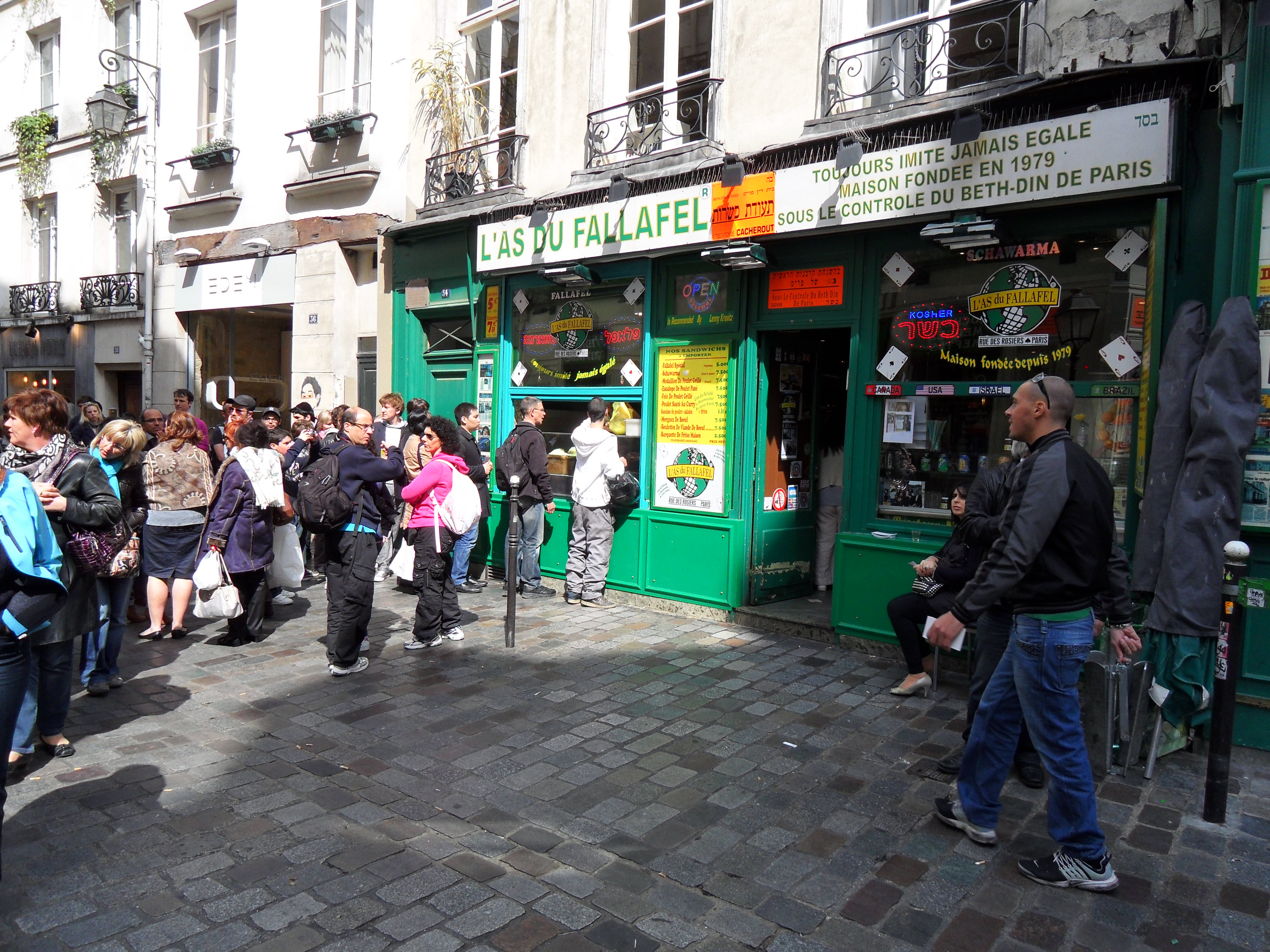
A line of tourists and locals waiting to buy L'As Du Fallafel's popular falafel sandwich during the busy lunch hour

L'As du Fallafel's dishes are based upon North African and Middle Eastern cuisine. Due to the restaurant's popularity and cramped seating, the lunchtime line often extends well into the street.

The restaurant is closed on Shabbat.

== Acclaim ==
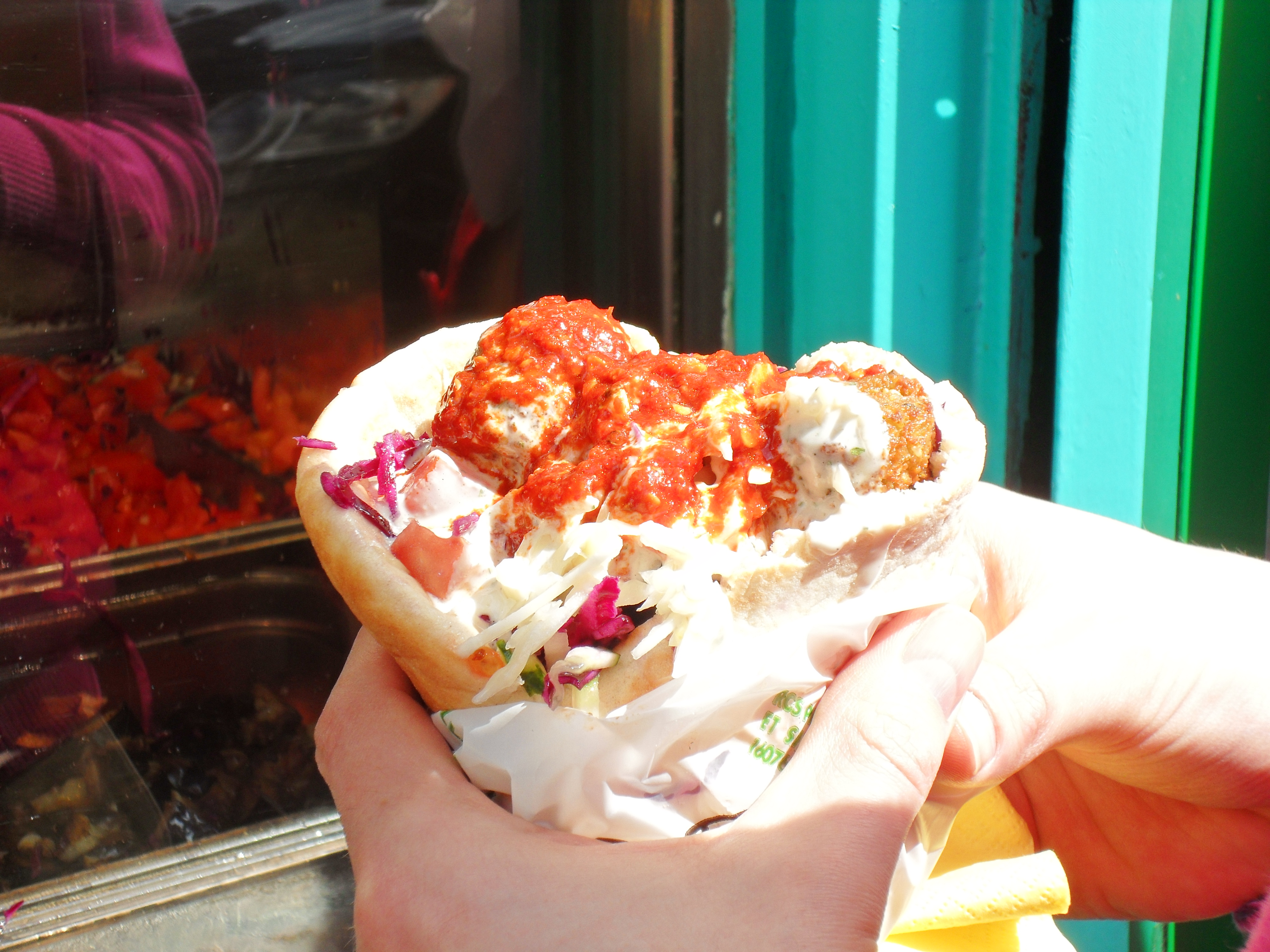
A patron of L'As du Fallafel holding the restaurant's acclaimed falafel sandwich covered in hot sauce

Writing in The New York Times travel section, Mark Bittman asserts that "this is the falafel destination in Paris, indeed in Europe." In Pauline Frommer's Paris, Margie Rynn shares that L’As du Fallafel "has, without a doubt, the best falafel in Paris."

The restaurant is said to be a favorite of rock musician Lenny Kravitz.

== See also ==
- List of kosher restaurants
