= Pletzl =

Jewish quarter in the fourth arrondissement of Paris, France

- Location within Paris
- Length: 500 m (1,600 ft)
- Width: 500 m (1,600 ft)
- Arrondissement: 4th
- Quarter: Le Marais
- Coordinates: 48°51′25.24″N 2°21′34.79″E

Construction
- Completed: 1881

The Pletzl (Yiddish: פלעצל; transl. little place) is the Jewish quarter in the 4th arrondissement of Paris, France. The Place Saint-Paul and the surrounding area were unofficially named the Pletzl when the neighborhood became predominantly Jewish after an influx of immigrants in the late 19th and early 20th centuries.

The area hosts a diverse Jewish community, assembling traditional Jewish families as well as many more who arrived through immigration from Eastern Europe and North Africa through the past centuries. The area is now characterised by its synagogues, butchers, delicatessens, and falafel vendors, which provide a social and cultural fabric for its inhabitants.

The darkest days for the Pletzl came during World War II, when Vichy France's collaboration with the Nazis resulted in raids that saw many residents abducted and sent off to concentration camps. Today, the community is a religious Orthodox one, and most citizens belong to one of the three local synagogues: one located at 17 Rue des Rosiers, another at 25 Rue des Rosiers, and the last one at 10 Rue Pavée; the latter is an art nouveau temple designed by Hector Guimard, famous for his work on the Paris Metro.

The street sign for the Pletzl in the Yiddish language was made by the contemporary French-Hungarian artist Sebestyén Fiumei in 2019. The sign has been stolen under unclear circumstances in July 2025 and is still missing.

== Name ==
At an unknown date, Paris installed a plaque at the corner of the Rue des Rosiers and the Rue Ferdinand Duval that explains why the Jewish quarter is known as the "Pletzl". Translated, it reads:

Fleeing persecution, Ashkenazi Jews flooded into Paris beginning in 1881. They found places living among their co-religionists already established in the Marais. By 1900, about 6,000 had arrived from Rumania, Russia, and Austria-Hungary; 18,000 more arrived in the years preceding the First World War. Installed in considerable numbers in the Rue des Écouffes, the Rue Ferdinand Duval (named Rue des Juifs, "Jews Street", until about 1900), and the Rue des Rosiers, they constituted a new community, the "Pletzl", the "little place" in Yiddish, and they created the École Israelite du Travail (Israelite Trade School) at 4B, Rue des Rosiers. The life of this community was evoked in the Roger Ikor novel, Les Eaux Mêlées ("Agitated Waters"), [which won the Prix Goncourt in 1955]. More than half of them perished in the Nazi concentration camps.

== Metro station ==
The Pletzl is located near Saint-Paul station on the Paris Metro.

== Streets of Pletzl ==
- Rue Pavée
- Rue des Rosiers
- Rue Ferdinand Duval
- Rue des Écouffes
- Rue des Hospitalières-Saint-Gervais
- Rue Vieille du Temple

== Notable attractions ==
- L'As du Fallafel - a popular Kosher Middle Eastern restaurant located on rue de Rosiers known for its acclaimed falafel sandwich.
- Synagogue at 17 rue de Rosiers, fondly known as "Zibetzin" (lit. 17) which was frequented by many of the Chabad-Lubavitch rebbes during their time in Paris.
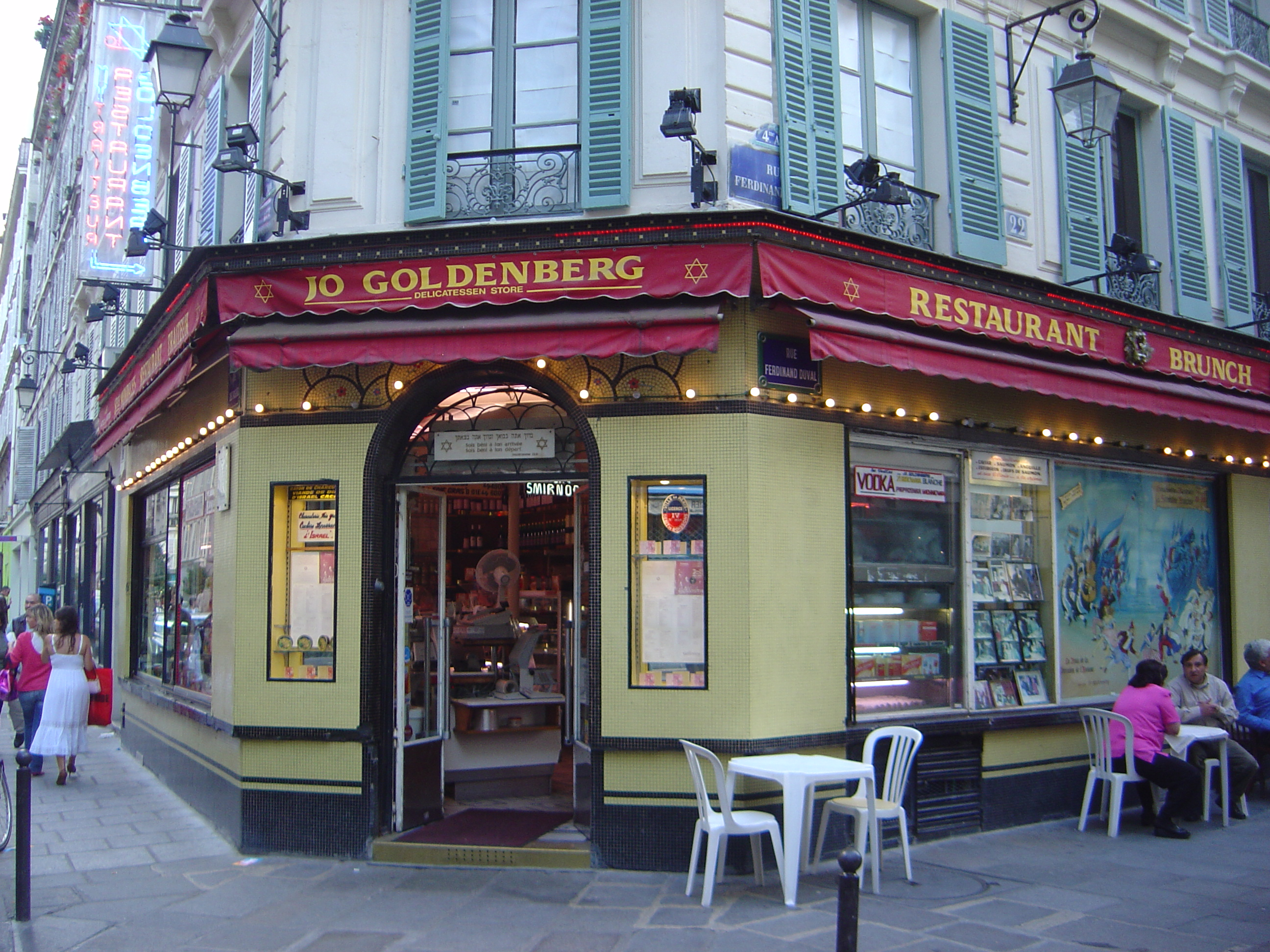
"Jo Goldenberg", a restaurant closed since 2007

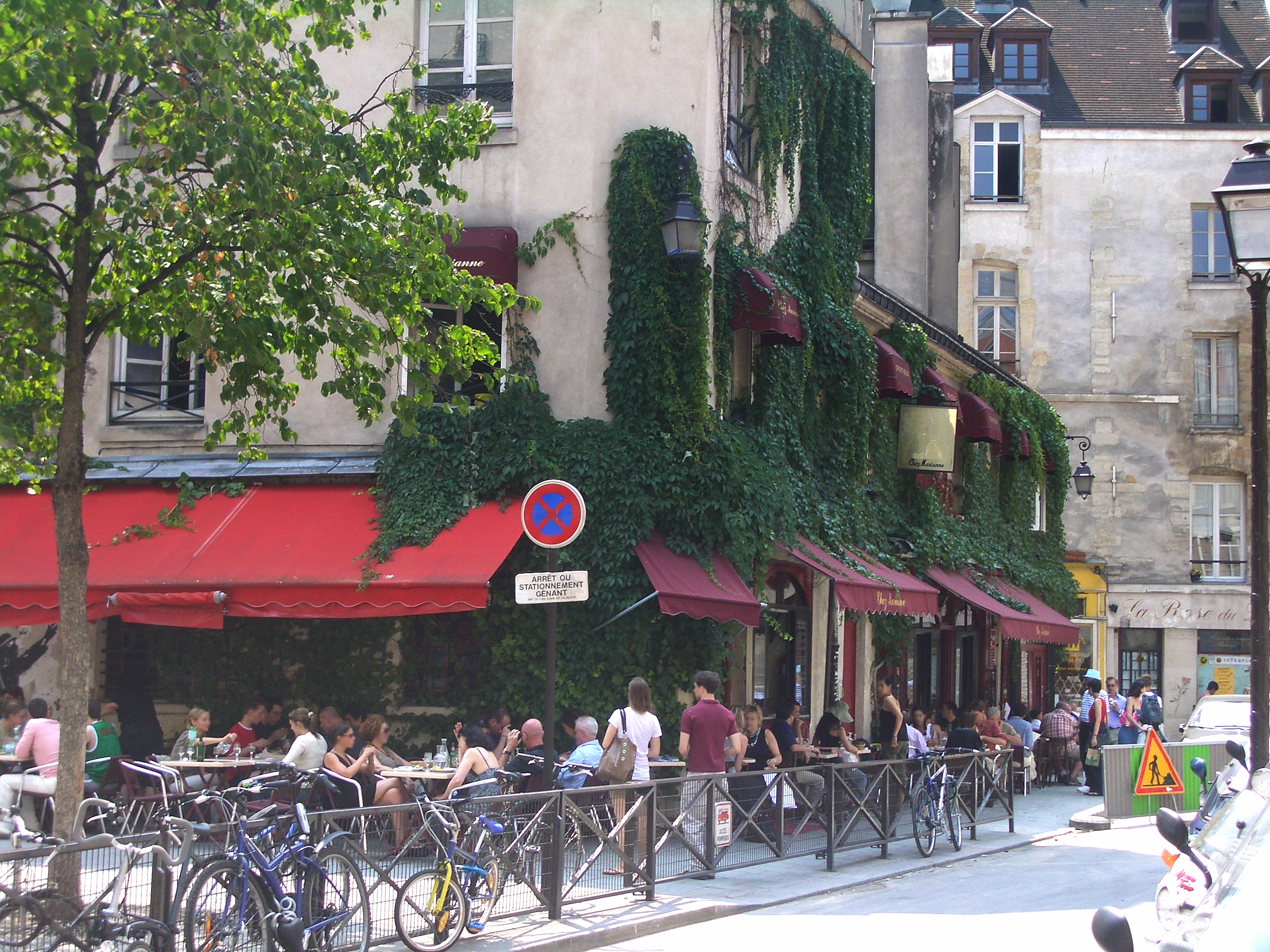
The Jewish restaurant, "Chez Marianne"

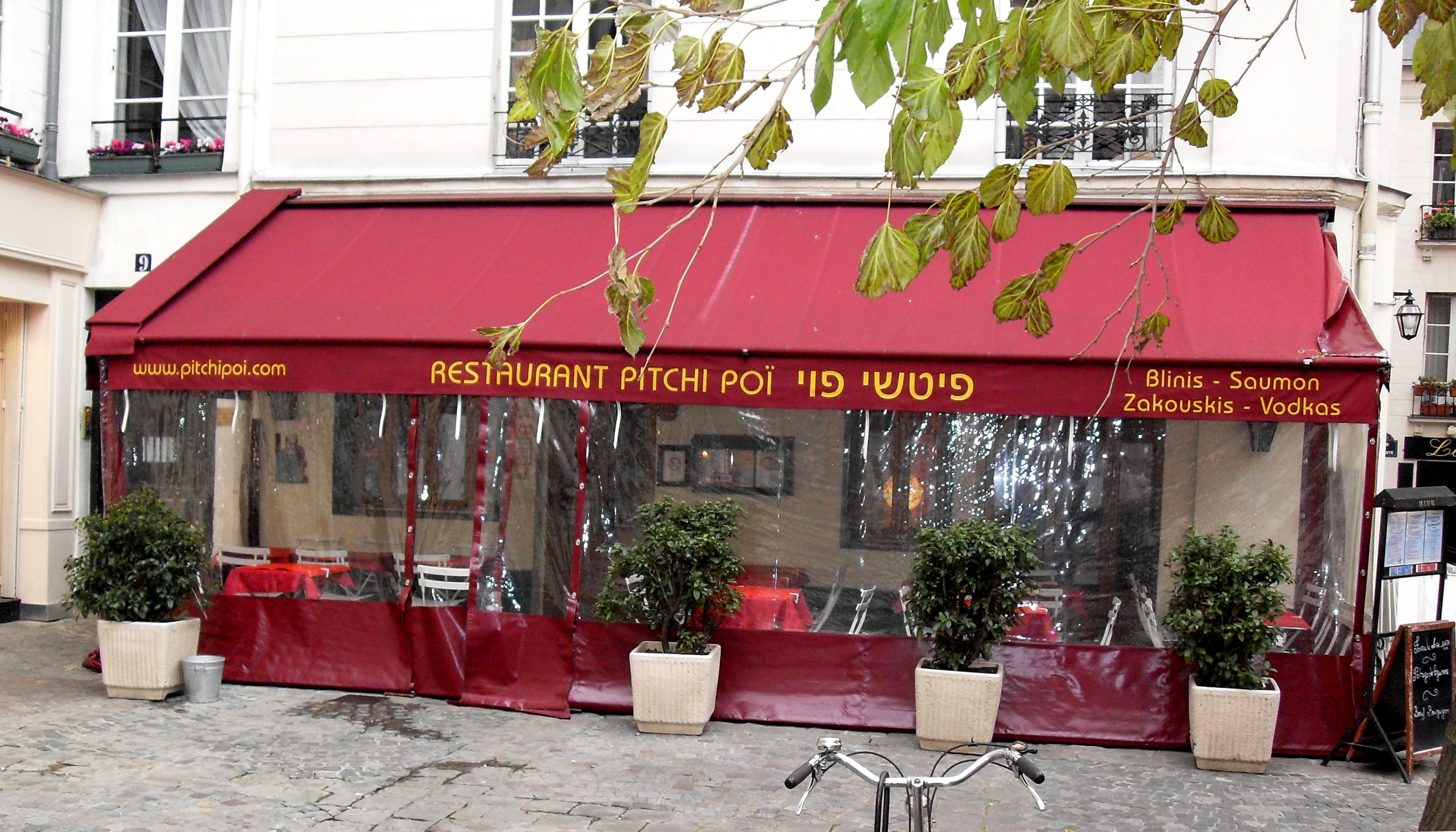
Another restaurant

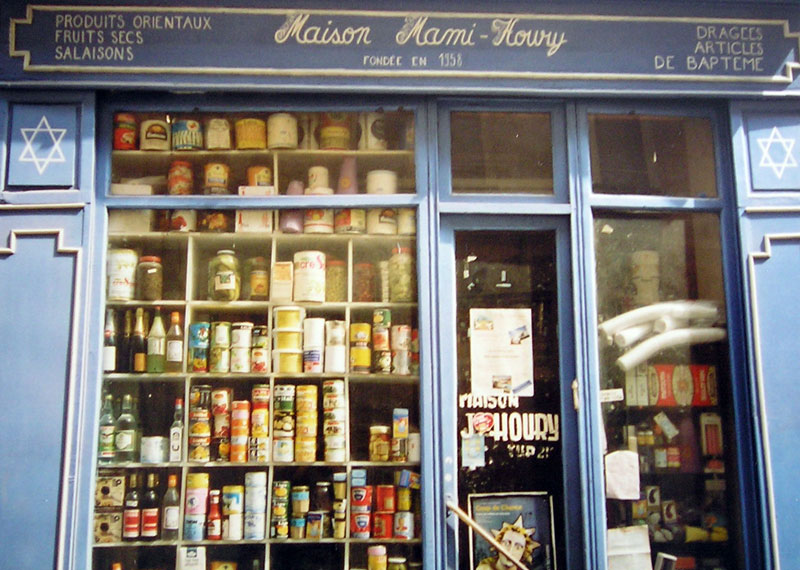
A Jewish shop

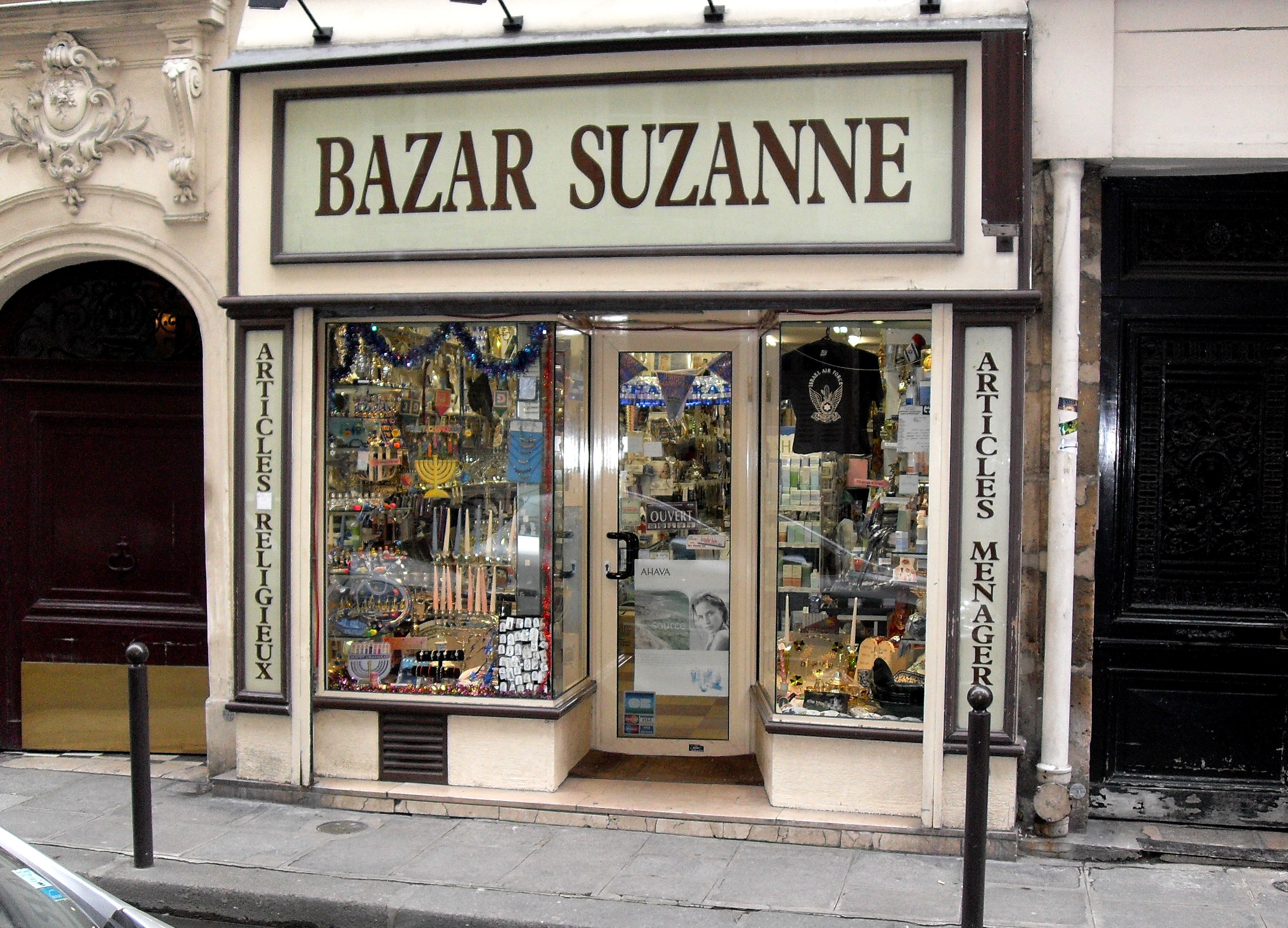
A store in the Pletzl

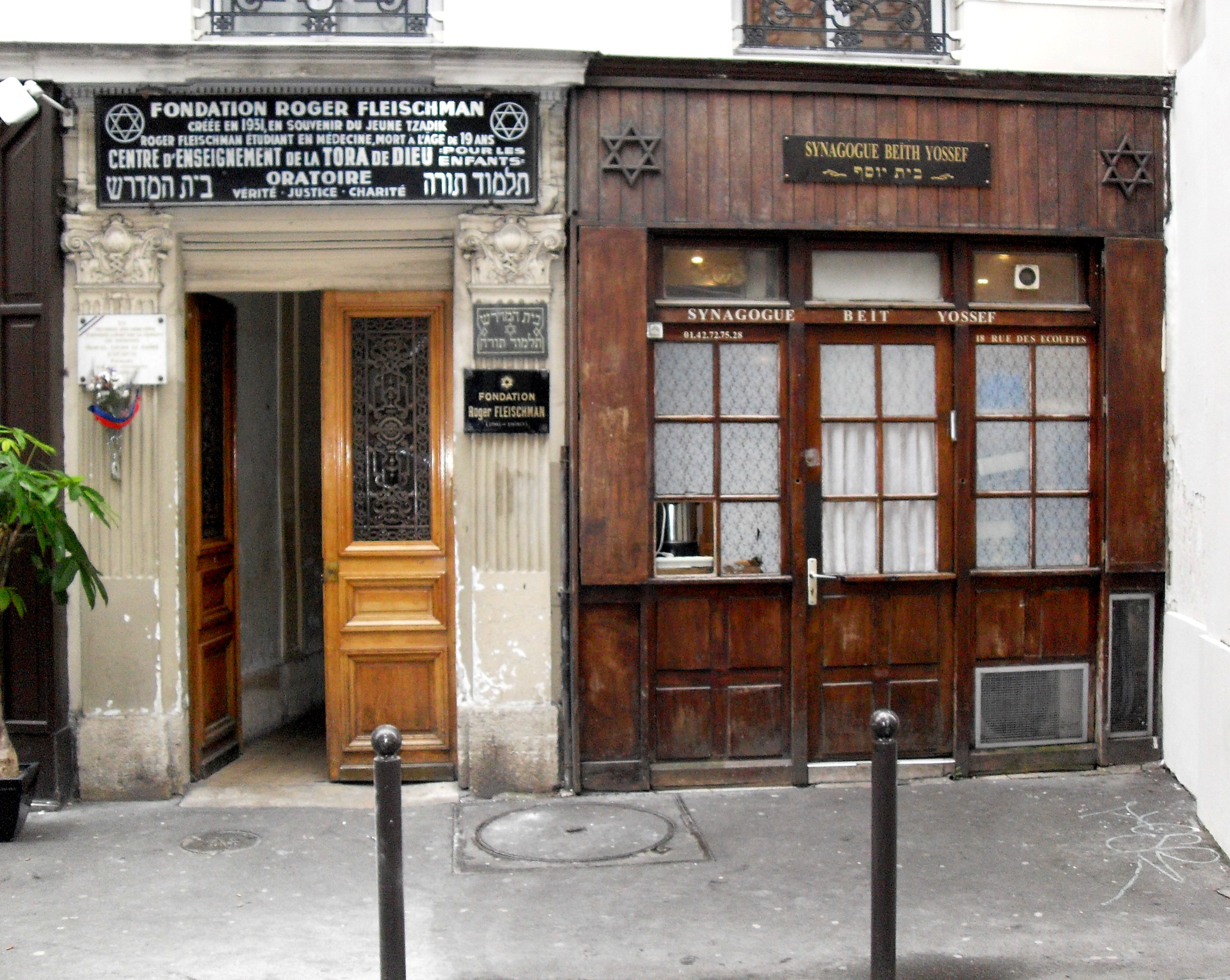
A synagogue

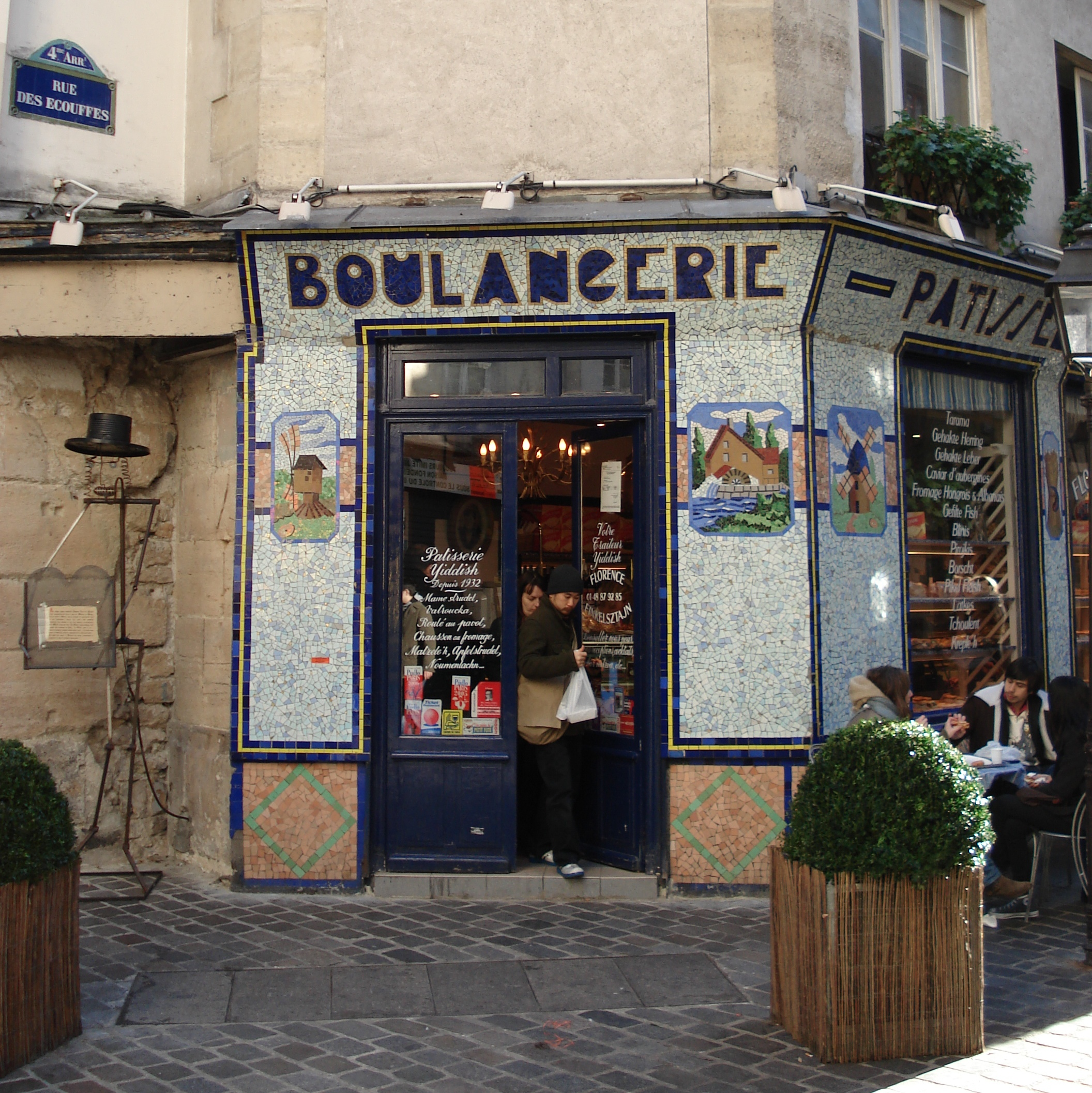
"Florence Kahn", a Jewish bakery in the Rue des Écouffes

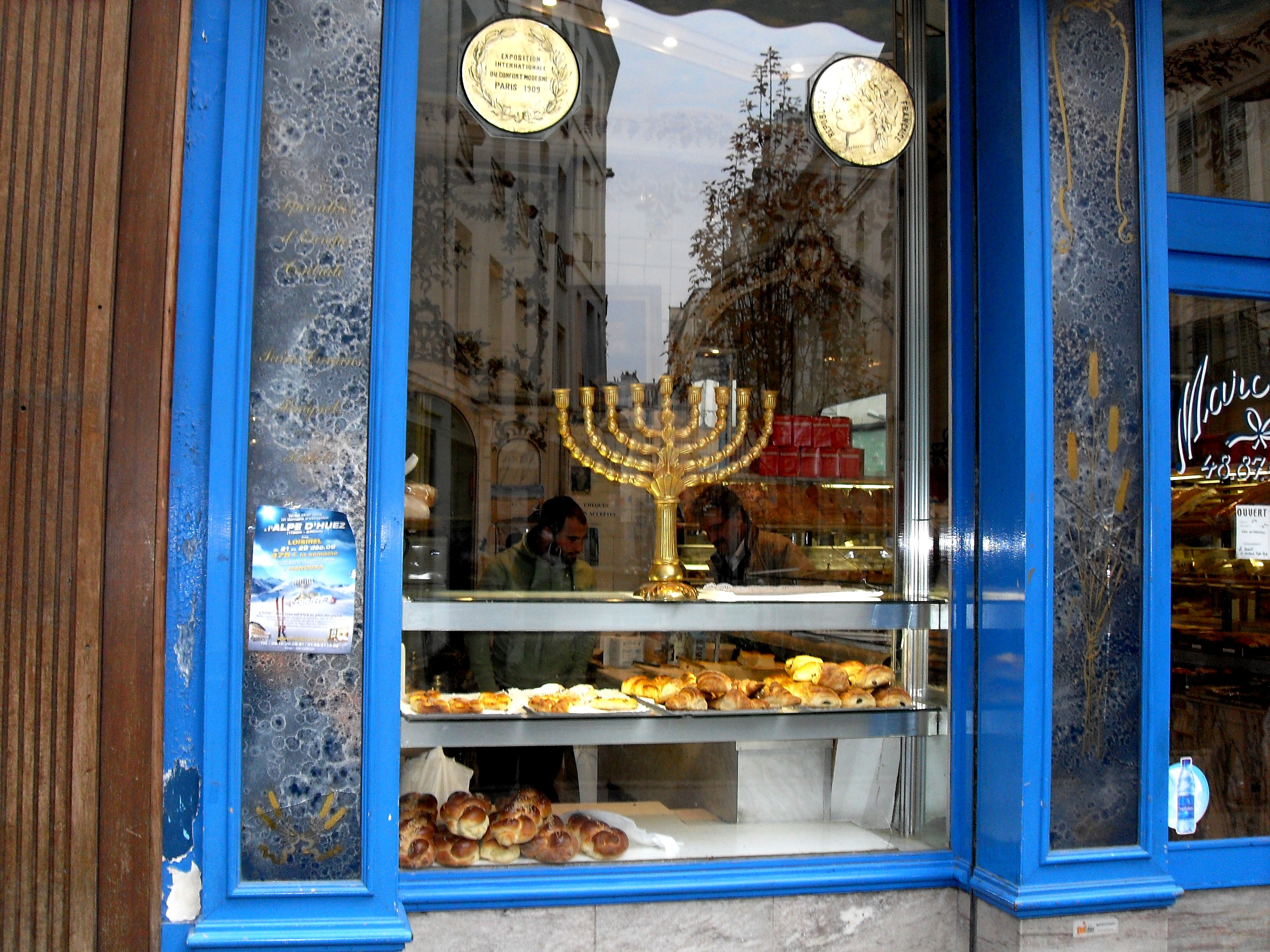
Another Jewish bakery in the Rue des Rosiers

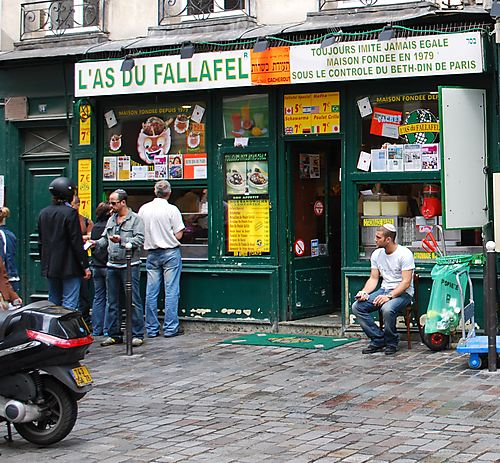
L'As du Fallafel, a popular Kosher restaurant on Rue des Rosiers

== Bibliography ==
- Etude remarquable de Nancy Green : The Pletzl of Paris : Jewish immigrant workers in the Belle époque, New York; London : Holmes and Meier, 1986, IX-270 p.; éd. fr., Les Travailleurs immigrés juifs à la Belle époque : le " Pletzl " de Paris, Paris, Fayard, 1985, 360 p.
