= Rue de Rivoli =

Street in central Paris, France

- Western stretch along the Tuileries Garden with the Louvre Palace ahead (both on the right).
- Interactive map of Rue de Rivoli
- Namesake: Battle of Rivoli
- Length: 3,070 m (10,070 ft)
- Width: 20.78 m (68.2 ft) along the Jardin des Tuileries; 22 m elsewhere
- Arrondissement: 1st, 4th
- Quarter: Saint-Germain l'Auxerrois. Halles. Palais Royal. place Vendôme. Saint-Merri. Saint-Gervais.
- From: 45 rue François Miron and 1 rue de Sévigné
- To: place de la Concorde and 2 rue Saint-Florentin

Construction
- Completed: May 3, 1848
- Denomination: April 25, 1804

The Rue de Rivoli (French pronunciation: [ʁy də ʁivɔli]) is a commercial street in central Paris, France named in honor of Napoleon's victory against the Austrians at the Battle of Rivoli in 1797. Initially developed by Napoleon through the heart of the city, the street would be completed by Baron Haussmann who finished the major extensions decades later. The street includes on one side the north wing of the Louvre Palace and the Tuileries Gardens.

== History ==
The Rue de Rivoli is an example of a transitional compromise between an environment of prestigious monuments and aristocratic squares, and the results of modern town-planning by municipal authorities.

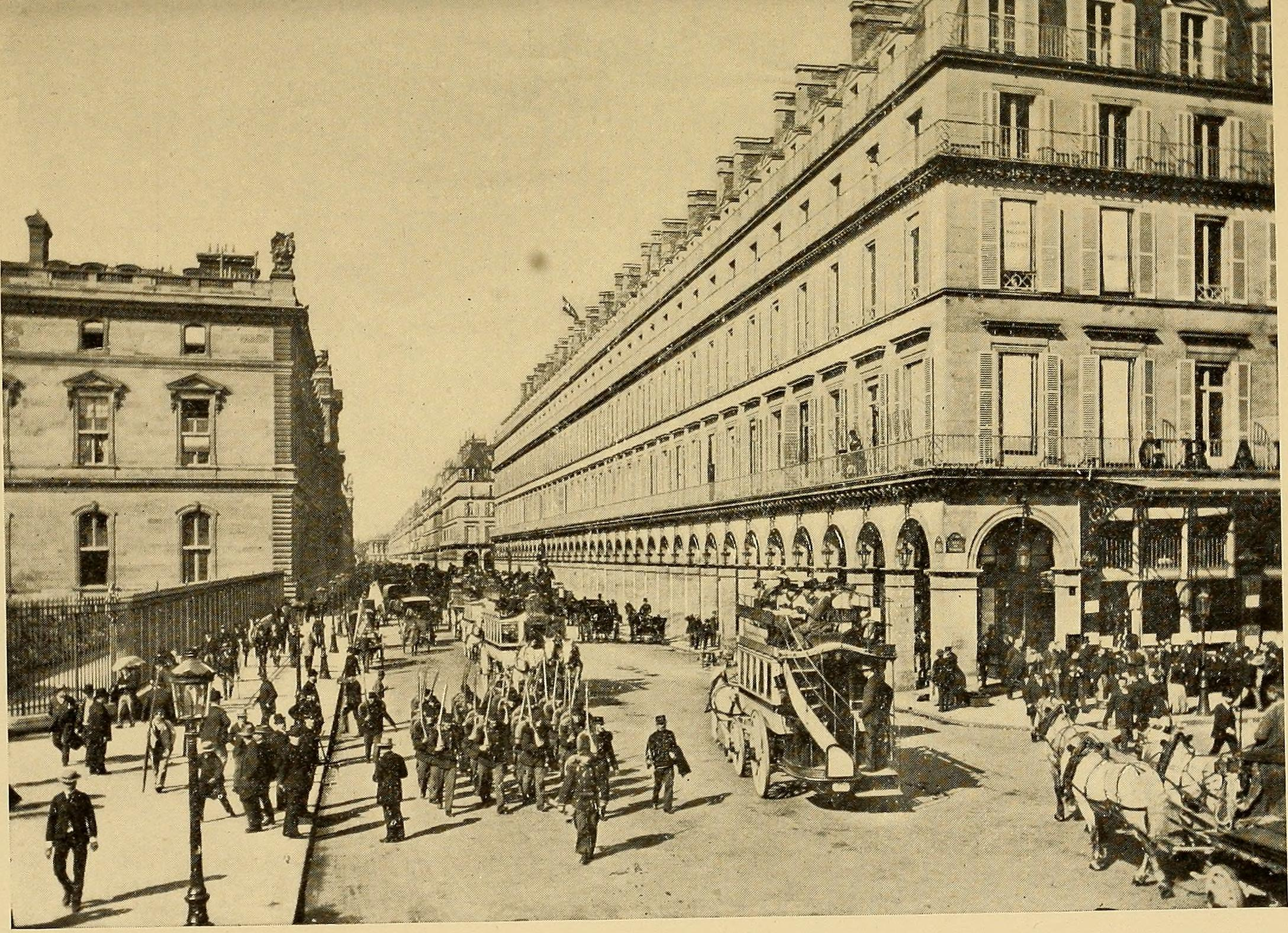
Rue de Rivoli between the north wing of the Louvre Palace (left) and the Louvre Saint-Honoré building (right) in 1900

The new street that Napoleon developed through the heart of Paris includes on one side the north wing of the Louvre Palace, (which Napoleon extended) and the Tuileries Gardens. Upon completion, it was the first time that a wide, well designed and aesthetically pleasing street bound the north wing of the Louvre Palace. Napoleon's original section of the street opened up eastward from the Place de la Concorde. Builders on the north side of the Place Louis XV, (as it then was named) between the Rue de Mondovi and Rue Saint-Florentin, had been constrained by letters patent in 1757 and 1758 to follow a single façade plan. The result was a pleasing uniformity, and Napoleon's planners extended a similar program, which resulted in the arcades and facades that extend along the street up to Rue du Louvre.

The restored Bourbon King Charles X continued the Rue de Rivoli eastwards from the Louvre, as did King Louis-Philippe. Finally, Baron Haussmann extended it into Le Marais.

In 1852, opposite the wing of the Louvre, Baron Haussmann enlarged the Place du Palais-Royal that is centred on the Baroque Palais Royal, built for Cardinal Richelieu in 1624 and willed to the royal family, with its garden surrounded by fashionable commercial arcades. At the rear of the garden is the older branch of the Bibliothèque Nationale, in the Rue de Richelieu.

East along the Rue de Rivoli, at the Place des Pyramides, is the gilded statue of Joan of Arc, situated close to where she was wounded at the Saint-Honoré gate in her unsuccessful attack on English-held Paris, on September 8, 1429. A little further along, towards the Place de la Concorde, the Rue de Castiglione leads to the Place Vendôme, with its Vendôme Column surmounted by the effigy of Napoleon Bonaparte. He began the building of the street in 1802; it was completed in 1865. A plaque at no. 144 commemorates the assassination there of the Huguenot leader Admiral Gaspard II de Coligny, in the St. Bartholomew's Day massacre of 1572.

Beneath the Rue de Rivoli runs one of the main brick-vaulted, oval-sectioned sewers of Paris's network, with its sidewalks for the sewer workers, and since 1900, the central section of Paris Metro Line 1, with stations at Concorde, Tuileries, Palais Royal, Louvre, Châtelet, Hôtel de Ville, and Saint-Paul. Châtelet is part of the rail hub of Châtelet–Les Halles, the largest underground station in Europe, which extends from the Seine to the site of the former markets of Les Halles and sees around 750,000 users per day.

Looking towards the intersection with Rue Vieille du Temple and Rue du Pont Louis-Philippe. The building lined with red banners ahead is the BHV flagship store. (February 2023)

Looking towards Place des Combattantes-et-Combattants-du-Sida and the eastern end of Rue de Rivoli in Le Marais (April 2026)

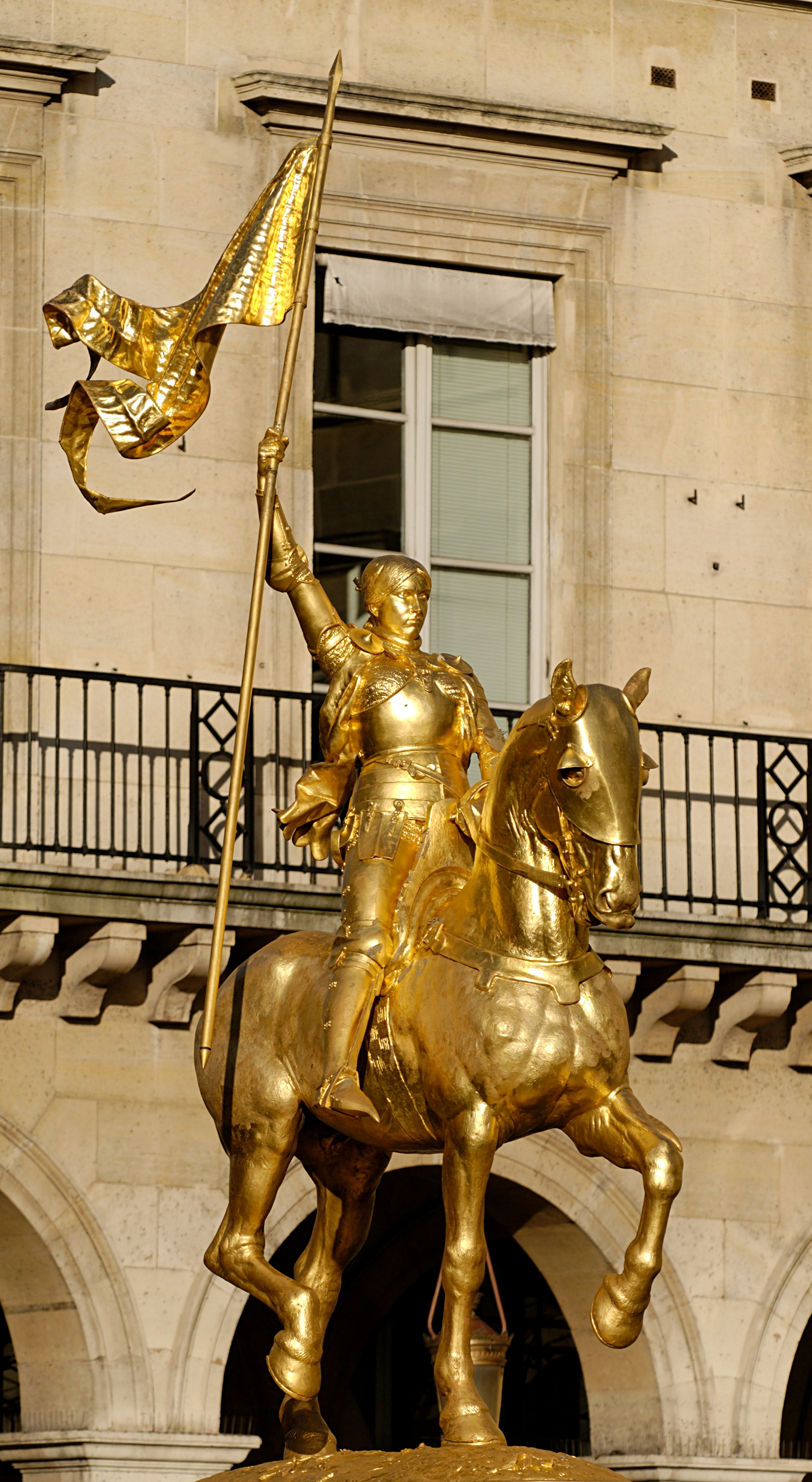
Joan of Arc, Place des Pyramides

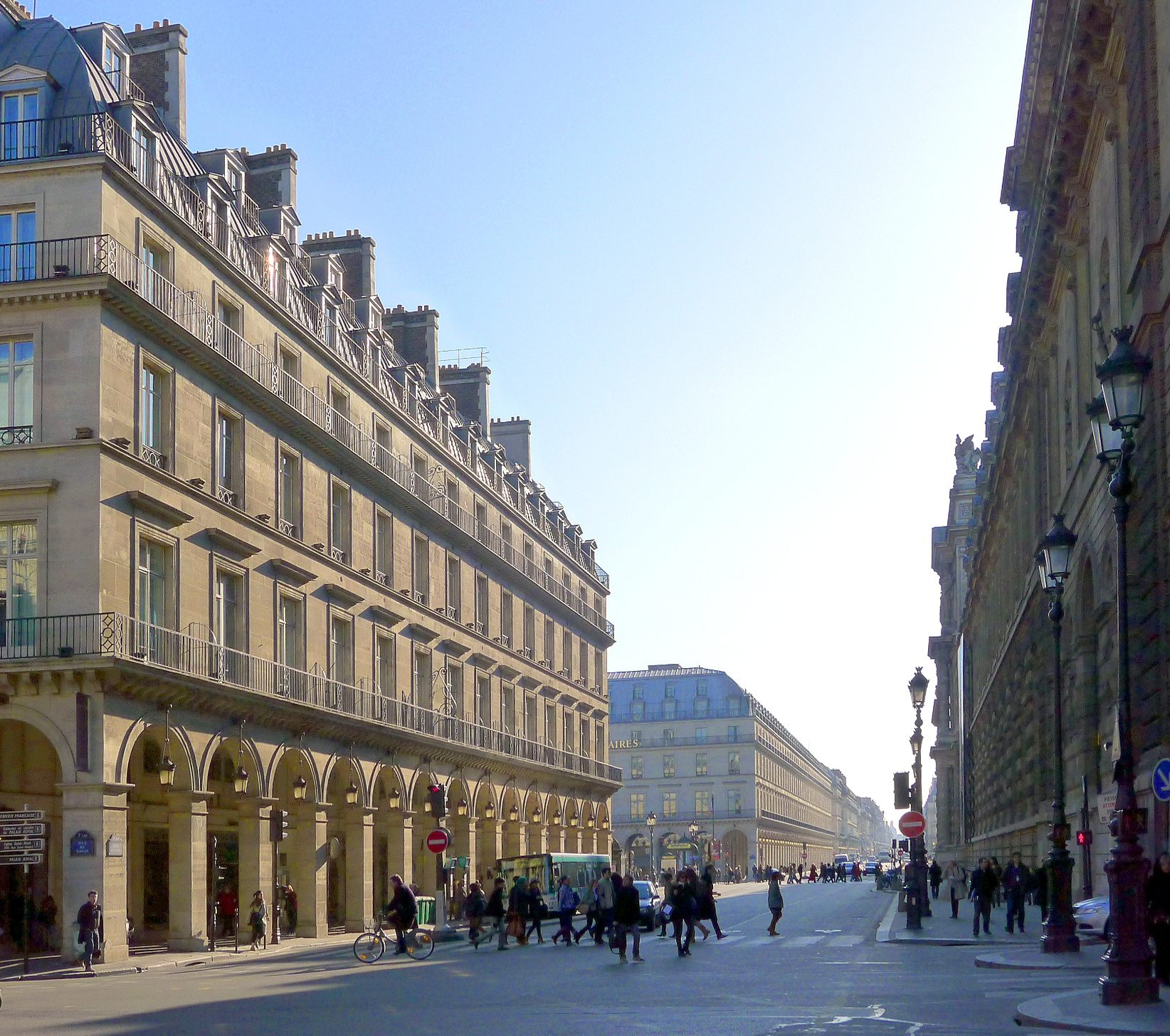
Past view along the Louvre Palace (March 2011)

== See also ==
- Rue des Archives, an adjoining street to the north
- Haussmann's renovation of Paris
