= The Mad Adventures of Rabbi Jacob =

1973 film by Gérard Oury

- Poster for the French release
- Directed by: Gérard Oury
- Written by: Gérard Oury; Danièle Thompson; Josy Eisenberg; Roberto de Leonardis
- Produced by: Bertrand Javal
- Starring: Louis de Funès; Suzy Delair; Claude Giraud; Marcel Dalio; Claude Piéplu; Renzo Montagnani; Henri Guybet; Miou-Miou
- Cinematography: Henri Decaë
- Edited by: Albert Jurgenson
- Music by: Vladimir Cosma
- Production company: SNC
- Distributed by: SNC
- Release date: 18 October 1973
- Running time: 100 minutes
- Countries: France; Italy
- Language: French
- Budget: $4.5 million
- Box office: $54.7 million

The Mad Adventures of Rabbi Jacob (French: Les Aventures de Rabbi Jacob, pronounced [lez‿avɑ̃tyʁ də ʁabi ʒakɔb]) is a 1973 comedy film co-written and directed by Gérard Oury, starring Louis de Funès and Claude Giraud. A France-Italy co-production, the film follows a bigoted businessman and a kidnapped revolutionist who disguise themselves as rabbis to escape from assassins. One of de Funès' most popular and iconic movies, it has become a cult classic.

== Plot ==
Rabbi Jacob (Marcel Dalio) is one of the most beloved rabbis of New York. One day, the French side of his family, the Schmolls, invite him to celebrate the bar mitzvah of young David, and he boards a plane for his native France after more than 30 years of American life. His young friend Rabbi Samuel accompanies him.

In Normandy (northern France), the rich businessman Victor Pivert (Louis de Funès) is also on his way to a wedding; his daughter (Miou-Miou) will be married the next day. Pivert is a dreadful man: bad-tempered, rude and bigoted, with a well-honed racism against Blacks, Jews, and pretty much all foreigners. He and his driver, Salomon (Henri Guybet), have a car accident in which Pivert's car (carrying a speed boat) flips upside-down into a lake. While Salomon is pulling the speed boat (now carrying the car) to the river bank, Pivert is using the car's telephone to call his factory for help, only to learn that his employees had begun a strike. As the hour turns late and the evening falls, Pivert orders Salomon to turn the car's light on. Salomon, who is Jewish, refuses to turn the lights on because the Sabbath has just begun. Pivert and Salomon begin to argue, both refusing to back down, and eventually Pivert fires Salomon, at the heat of the moment, much to Salomon's content, having been fed-up with his boss's attitude.

Arab revolutionist leader Mohamed Larbi Slimane (Claude Giraud) is kidnapped by killers who are working for his country's government. The team, led by Colonel Farès, takes him by night to an empty bubble gum factory... the same place where Victor Pivert goes to find assistance. Pivert involuntarily helps Slimane to flee, leaving two killers' corpses behind them. The police, alerted by Salomon, find the bodies and accuse Pivert of the crime.

The next day, Slimane forces Pivert to go to Orly airport to catch a plane to Slimane's country (if the revolution succeeds, he will become president). However, they are followed by a number of people: the jealous Germaine, Pivert's wife, who thinks her husband is going to leave her for another woman; Farès and the killers; and the police commissioner Andréani (Claude Piéplu), a zealous and overly suspicious cop who imagines that Pivert is the new Al Capone. Farès and his cohorts manage to kidnap Germaine, and they use her own dentist equipment to interrogate her.

Trying to conceal his and Pivert's identities, Slimane attacks two rabbis in the toilets, stealing their clothes and shaving their beards and their payot. The disguises are perfect, and they are mistaken for Rabbi Jacob and Rabbi Samuel by the Schmoll family. The only one who recognizes Pivert (and Slimane) behind the disguise is Salomon, his former driver, who just happens to be a Schmoll nephew. But Pivert and Slimane are able to keep their identity secret and even manage to hold a sermon in Hebrew, thanks to the polylingual Slimane, as well as taking part in a very energetic Hasidic dance, one of the memorable scenes from the film.

After a few misunderstandings, Commissioner Andréani and his two inspectors are mistaken by the Jews for terrorists, attempting to kill Rabbi Jacob. The real Rabbi Jacob arrives at Orly, where no one is waiting for him any more. He is mistaken for Victor Pivert by the police, then by Farès and his killers (both times in a painful way for his long beard).

There is a chaotic, but sweeping happy ending:

- The revolution is a success and Slimane becomes President of the Republic.
- Pivert's daughter falls in love with Slimane and escapes her dull fiancé near the altar to go with him.
- Pivert learns tolerance towards other religions and cultures; also, Salomon and Slimane make peace with their respective Arab and Jewish colleagues.
- The Schmolls finally find the real Rabbi Jacob.
- The Piverts and the Schmolls go feasting and celebrating together.

== Cast ==
- Louis de Funès - Victor Pivert
- Suzy Delair - Germaine Pivert
- Claude Giraud - Mohamed Larbi Slimane / Rabbi Zeligman
- Henri Guybet - Salomon (chauffeur)
- Marcel Dalio - Rabbi Jacob
- Renzo Montagnani - Colonel Farès
- Janet Brandt - Tzipé Schmoll
- André Falcon - the minister
- Xavier Gélin - Alexandre
- Miou-Miou - Antoinette Pivert
- Denise Provence - Esther Schmoll
- Claude Piéplu - Andreani
- Michel Robin - the monk
- Jacques François - the general
- Gérard Darmon - Farès' bodyguard
- Cherif Adnane - Farès' bodyguard
- Abder El Kebir - Farès' bodyguard
- Malek Kateb - Farès' bodyguard
- Pierre Koulak - Farès' bodyguard
- Noël Darzal
- Lucien Melki - Farès' bodyguard
- Dominique Zardi

== Release ==
While Georges Cravenne (the film's publicity agent) was promoting the film on the day of its release, his second wife, Danielle Cravenne, hijacked an Air France B727 that was en route from Paris to Egypt. Armed with a .22 long rifle and a fake pistol, she threatened to destroy the plane if the film was not banned. Cravenne declared herself to be a member of the solidarity movement for the French-Israeli-Arab reconciliation and considered the film's release unacceptable as it was being released during the Yom Kippur War. Cravenne agreed to let the plane land in Marseille to refuel. French police disguised as maintenance workers boarded the plane, shot and killed her (she was 35 years old). However, despite the incident, the film was still released.

== Reception and legacy ==
=== Critical response ===
The Mad Adventures of Rabbi Jacob received universal acclaim from critics and was nominated for a Golden Globe Award for Best Foreign Film. It is widely regarded as one of the most popular French comedies of all time. Phil Hall of Film Threat called it "a masterpiece of slapstick", stating that "This wild movie achieves the near-impossible of being politically incorrect without being nasty, of overdoing the slapstick without becoming tiresome". Roger Moore of Movie Nation stated: "Pre-Blazing Saddles and Airplane!, Rabbi Jacob could claim to having more gags-per-minute than any film anybody had ever seen". Judith Crist of New York Magazine was equally enthusiastic upon its release, saying that "Rabbi Jacob is the best of the Chaplin-Marx Bros. spirit, sustained by a touch of satire here and a wink there".

=== Box office ===
The film broke box-office records in France, Spain, Germany, Israel and Canada. A total of 7,295,727 tickets were purchased by the end of its theatrical run, placing it at the top of the French box office for 1973.

=== In other media ===
The trailer was featured in the 2012 compilation film Trailer War.
