= Saint-Paul station (Paris Metro) =

Paris Métro station

Saint-Paul
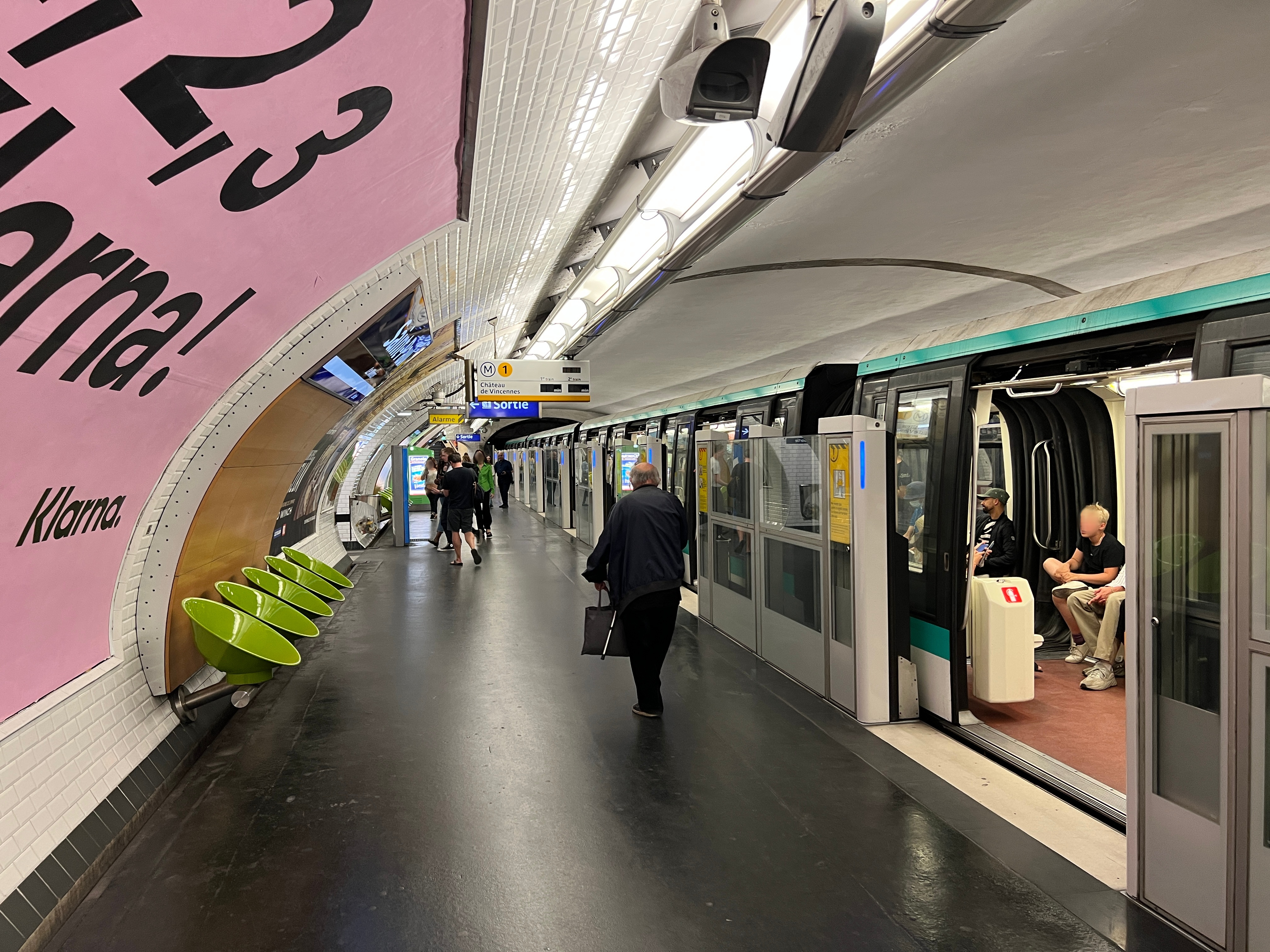

General information
- Other names: Le Marais
- Location: 10, Rue de Rivoli; 4th arrondissement of Paris; Île-de-France; France
- Coordinates: 48°51′19″N 2°21′39″E
- Owner: RATP
- Operator: RATP
- Line: Paris Metro Paris Metro Line 1
- Platforms: 2 (side platforms)
- Tracks: 2

Construction
- Accessible: No

Other information
- Fare zone: 1

History
- Opened: 19 July 1900; 126 years ago

Services
Preceding station	Paris Metro	Following station
Hôtel de Ville towards La Défense	Line 1	Bastille towards Château de Vincennes
Route map
Location
- Location within Paris

Saint-Paul (Le Marais) (French pronunciation: [sɛ̃ pɔl lə maʁɛ]) is a station on Line 1 of the Paris Métro, close to Rue Saint-Paul. It serves the neighbourhood of the Marais (Le Marais), known for its Jewish and gay communities, and fine townhouses (hôtels particuliers).

Nearby are the Musée Carnavalet, the Jewish quarter Pletzl around the Rue des Rosiers, the Lycée Charlemagne, as well as the Place des Vosges (also served by Chemin Vert station), accessible through the garden of the Hôtel de Sully.

== History ==
The station was opened on 6 August 1900, 18 days after trains began running on the original section of Line 1 between Porte de Vincennes and Porte Maillot on 19 July 1900.

The station is subtitled Le Marais because of its location in the south-central part of the Marais district, so called because of its location in a former marshy area.

During the First World War, on the night of 12 to 13 April 1918, German Gotha aircraft bombed the area around the station.

The corridors were modernised towards the end of the 1950s by the installation of sand-coloured tiles on the jambs, while the platforms were among the first in the network to receive metal camber. Like the majority of the stations on line 1 between May 1963 and December 1964, the platforms were extended to 90 metres by means of a crypt at their eastern end, in order to accommodate six-car trains to cope with the significant chronic overloading of the above-mentioned line since the post-war period.

The metal camber was later be replaced by flat white ceramic tiles on the walls, two specific suspended light strips surrounded by metal slats, as well as green Motte style seats. Until 2007, this special layout was complemented by shop windows used as advertising spaces by local shopkeepers and as display cases on various themes for contemporary designers and creators.

In 2009, the renovation work as part of the full automation of line 1 led to the disappearance of these facilities, including the windows, in favour of a return to the traditional bevelled white tiles. The station's platforms were raised on the weekend of April 4 and 5, 2009 to accommodate platform screen doors, which were installed in November 2010.

== Passenger services ==
=== Access ===
The station has a single access called Rue de Rivoli, including two metro entrances situated on the Place des Combattantes-et-Combattants-du-Sida, opposite the Rue du Prévôt, where the Rue Saint-Antoine gives way to the Rue de Rivoli. The main entrance consists of a fixed staircase adorned with a Val d'Osne candelabra, while the secondary exit consists of an escalator going up allowing only the exit from the platforms towards Château de Vincennes. The two accesses are embellished with a Dervaux-style balustrade.

The jambs of the access corridors and the distribution room are covered with sand-coloured tiles with hollow patterns typical of the 1950s, which can also be found in the interchange corridors of the Charles de Gaulle-Étoile station (lines 1, 2 and 6), as well as in a corridor of the Denfert-Rochereau station (lines 4 and 6) near the RER B.

=== Station layout ===
Street Level

B1	Connecting level

Line 1 platforms	Side platform with PSDs, doors will open on the right
Line 1 platforms	Westbound	← toward La Défense – Grande Arche (Hôtel de Ville)
Line 1 platforms	Eastbound	toward Château de Vincennes (Bastille) →
Line 1 platforms	Side platform with PSDs, doors will open on the right

=== Platforms ===
Saint-Paul is a standard station. It has two platforms separated by the metro tracks and the vault is elliptical. A 15-metre-long crypt, whose ceiling rests on closely spaced pillars, has been extended at its eastern end since the switch to six-car trains in the 1960s, and a skylight just beyond it allows some daylight to penetrate. The decoration is in the style used for the majority of metro stations, combined with the specific arrangements of this line since its automation. The lighting canopies are white and rounded in the Gaudin style of the metro revival of the 2000s, and the beveled white ceramic tiles cover the walls and the tunnel exits. The vault is painted white, while the columns of the crypt are covered with small dark panes. The advertising frames are made of white ceramic, and the name of the station is inscribed in Parisine font on backlit panels incorporated into wooden boxes. The platforms are equipped with green Akiko seats and has half-height platform screen doors.

=== Bus connections ===
The station is served by lines 69, 76 and 96 of the RATP bus network as well as by the tourist line Tootbus Paris and at night, it is served by lines N11 and N16 of the Noctilien bus network.
