= Ghost stations of the Paris Metro =

Unused train stations

Ghost stations of the Paris Metro are stations that have been closed to the public (or never opened) and are not used in commercial service. For historical, geographical or economical reasons, many stations on the Paris Metro have been closed or never opened, made inaccessible and lie unused, conferring a sense of mystery over Parisians and sparking interest of the Urban explorers.

The majority of these ghost stations were closed when France entered World War II in September 1939, with some closed ever since. Others have been reused or disappeared completely as the network evolved. Five stations were constructed but never actually used, and today still lie inaccessible to the public. Three others were designed but were never serviced by a Metro line.

== Never-opened stations ==
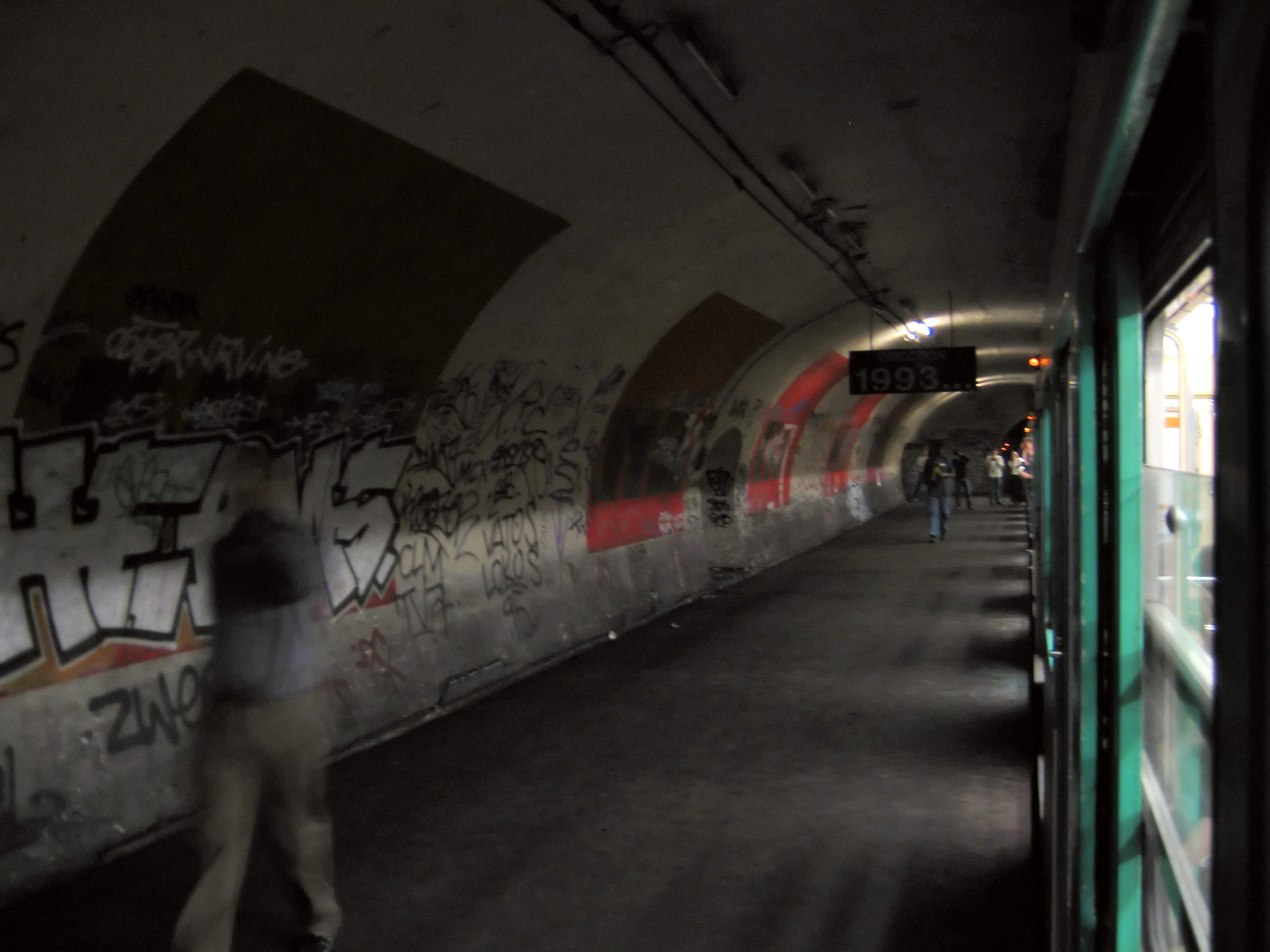
Haxo station has no pedestrian access.

Two stations on the Paris Metro were constructed but never used and have no pedestrian access apart from another train: Porte Molitor and Haxo. Only during rare special service can these stations be visited.

Porte Molitor was constructed in 1923 on a shuttle linking lines 9 and 10 and was originally intended to service the Parc des Princes and Roland Garros stadiums on match nights. Logistics of this service became too complex, however; and, the project was abandoned before the pedestrian accesses to the station were constructed. The tracks today serve as train garages.

A special tunnel, the voie des Fêtes, links Place des Fêtes to Porte des Lilas with an intermediary station called Haxo, constructed in 1921. This tunnel was intended to connect lines 3 and 7 (now 3bis and 7bis). The tunnel was never used as it was decided to run a shuttle service between the stations of each of these lines. This shuttle proved unpopular with passengers and service stopped in 1939. Haxo has never been used for passenger transport, and there is no pedestrian access. However, there is a proposal to merge lines 3bis and 7bis into a new line, which if completed would mean completion and opening of the station to the public. As both tunnels are currently used by RATP for special purposes - MF 88 train maintenance on the Voie Navette and movie shootings on Voie des Fêtes - the merger project would also imply finding (or creating) new underground tracks for movie purposes before opening the presently unnumbered line.

Three other stations were planned and pre-dug as part of past long-term extensions that since got dropped: Défense - Élysées, Défense - Michelet and the original Orly Airport station initially meant for an extension of the Villejuif branch of Line 7. All three had their space reserved for future construction, yet only the first two were built; however, not a single rail was laid.

== Stations closed and later reopened ==
At the beginning of World War II, the French government put into action a plan that called for reduced service on the Metro network; specifically, it closed all but 85 stations. The majority of stations that were closed reopened in the following years, however some lightly trafficked and therefore unprofitable stations remained closed for a longer time.

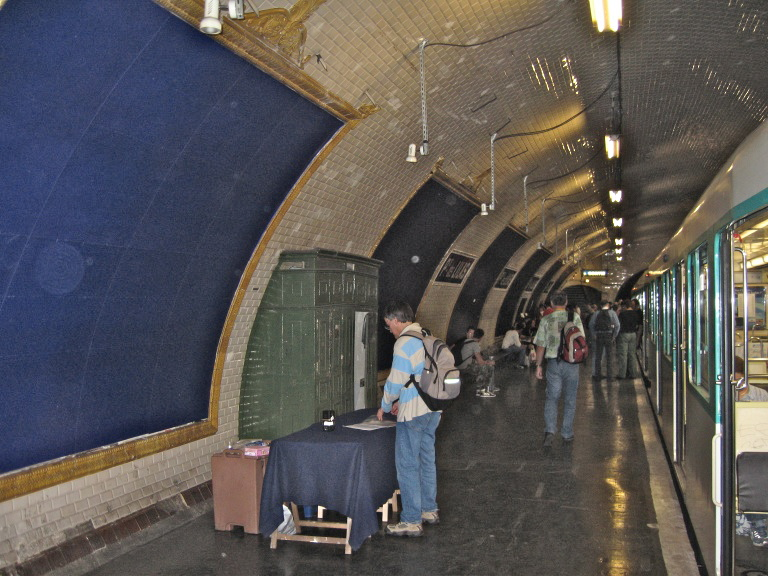
Porte des Lilas - Cinéma is used for ad and movie shootings.

Varenne (Line 14, now Line 13) reopened on 24 December 1962, followed by the station Bel-Air (Line 6) on 7 January 1963. Rennes (Line 12) and Liège (Line 13) reopened to the public after about 30 years of being closed, on 20 May 1968 and 16 September 1968 respectively. These stations were subject to abbreviated schedules: they closed at 8 PM on weekdays and Saturdays, and did not open on Sundays and holidays. Rennes returned to normal service schedules on 6 September 2004 and Liège, the last station on an abbreviated schedule of the network, returned to normal hours on 4 December 2006.

Cluny (Line 10) remained forgotten for almost half a century, however the construction of the train station Saint-Michel–Notre-Dame to service Line B of the RER caused it to be reopened in order to provide a connection to Line 10. It was reopened to the public on 17 February 1988, the day on which the RER B station was opened. The station was renamed Cluny–La Sorbonne.

== Closed stations ==
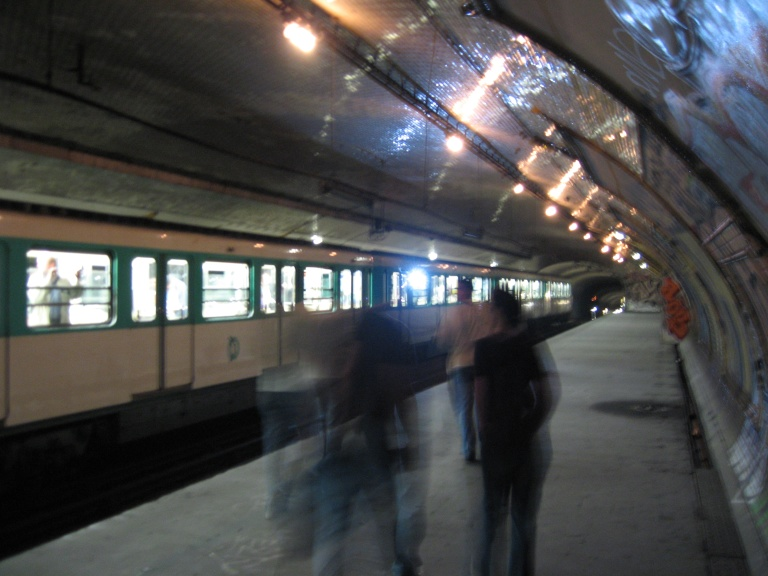
The station Croix-Rouge, an old terminus of Line 10, has been closed since 1939.

Saint-Martin station was closed in 1939, reopened after the Liberation, then closed again. This station was situated on the Grands Boulevards and therefore served as an important access point, however it was eventually closed again because of its proximity—less than 100 metres (110 yd)—to the neighbouring station Strasbourg–Saint-Denis.

Three stations have remained closed since 1939: Arsenal (Line 5), Champ de Mars (Line 8), and Croix-Rouge (Line 10). These stations were also reopened after the Liberation of France, but later analysis in 1946 deemed these stations too unprofitable to remain open, and the stations were closed again, never to reopen. The fourth one, Cluny, was saved and reopened when RER B was extended which offered a better connection to Line 10.

Three other open stations contain unused platforms (that is they are inaccessible to the public):

- Porte des Lilas – Cinéma, this unused station on the Voie Navette connecting lines 3bis and 7bis. This specific station was used by a shuttle between 1921 and 1939, and for the MP 51 experimentation during 1950s, now rebranded for movie and ad shootings.
- Danube, the first platform is used for trains towards Louis Blanc, the other is used for train maintenance.
- Invalides, a specific platform towards Balard was never used and remains closed to public. Another platform was intended to be used by a circular line towards Bastille but the project was aborted in 1922.

The unused platforms of Porte des Lilas - Cinéma might be reused if the merger of lines 3bis and 7bis is realised, and the second platform of Pré-Saint-Gervais used for train maintenance is modified. A replacement of the MF 88 by the MF 19 is necessary for these operations, which is expected in December 2026.

== Merged stations ==
As a result of the expansion of Line 3 to Gallieni, the station Martin Nadaud was integrated into the station Gambetta. The station still exists today: it is situated in the extension of the Gambetta station in the direction of Pont de Levallois–Bécon, at a site surrounded by a gate, with its platforms being repurposed, and now they are used as walkways from the original Martin Nadaud entrances to the new Gambetta station.

== Repurposed stations ==
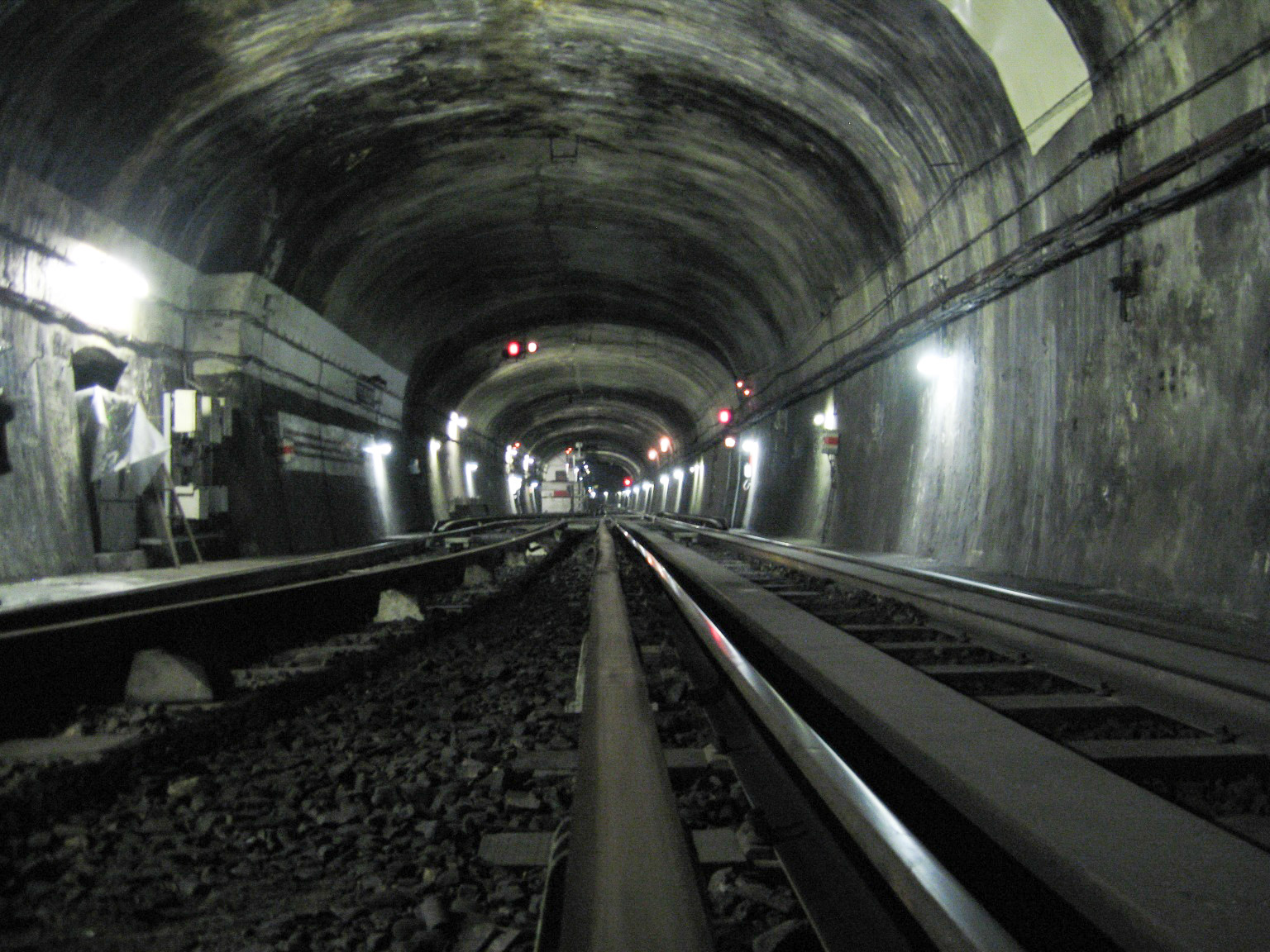
Training platforms at Gare du Nord USFRT

Gare du Nord USFRT, the old terminus of Line 5 until 1942 and situated on the boulevard de Denain, became a ghost station after the expansion of Line 5 to Pantin, which involved the construction of a new station under the rue du Faubourg-Saint-Denis. It has since served as the center for training RATP drivers, alongside the rail connection transfer between lines 2 and 5.

Olympiades was used as a service depot for Line 14 before the expansion of the tunnel to Maison Blanche and the creation of a new service depot.

The old terminus loop of Line 3 at Villiers was also turned into a training center for RATP staff, just outside Parc Monceau.

== Moved stations ==
Four stations have been moved during the construction and extension of lines:

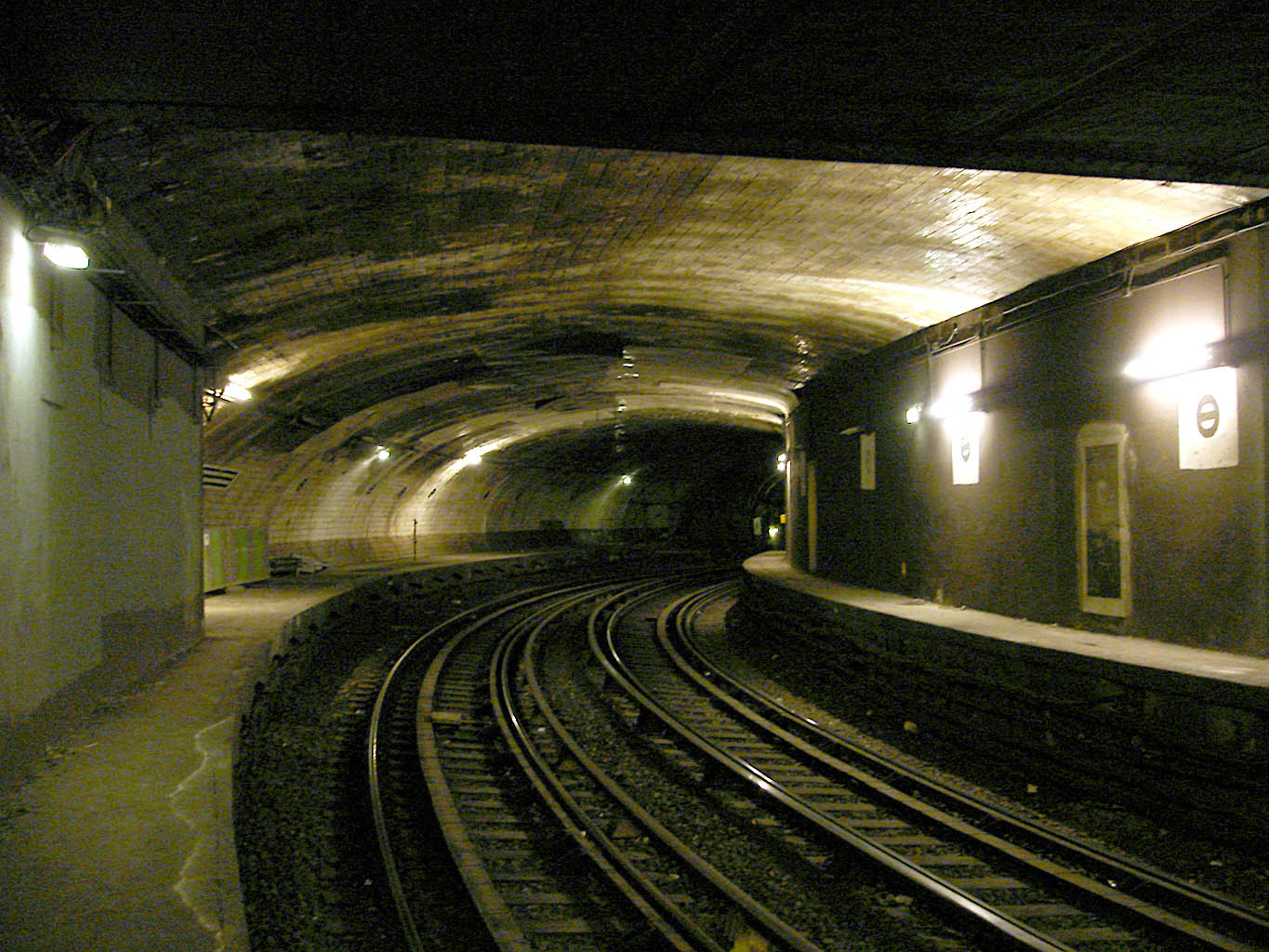
Remainders of the old station Victor Hugo.

- Porte de Versailles: old terminus of Line A (Now Line 12) of the former Nord-Sud Company, at the front of the current station towards Paris. Old tiling is still visible, and this explains the offset of the actual station's platforms.
- Victor Hugo was originally built right in the curve, then moved a few hundred meters to the east towards Étoile due to new rolling stock with elongated cars, proving too long for the original station's platforms, which were short and tightly curved. The old station platforms are still accessible to RATP staff, and visible for passengers when the trains leave the station towards Dauphine.
- Loop of Porte Maillot: old terminus of Line 1 before its extension to Pont de Neuilly. At one point, one of its platforms served as a stateroom for the RATP. Since the beginning of 2007, the loop has been undergoing renovations to become an extra service depot for the future MP 05 rolling stock, as part of the automation of Line 1.
- Les Halles: the station was reconstructed in 1977 a few dozen metres towards the east (parallel to the old station) in order to allow for a better connection with the newly constructed RER station. It does not use any part of the old station.

== Abandoned plans for stations ==
Three other stations had been planned, outside the neighbourhood of La Défense and the Orly Airport, but have never been served by any lines. Two are situated under the business district, and another under the southern part of the Orly Airport. These stations consist only of a concrete box, void of any further development.

Since the expansion of Line 1 to Pont de Neuilly in 1937, the future expansion to La Défense had already been considered. Outside of the flagstone pedestrian walks, which include a number of platforms and underground parking from the 1960s and 1970s, the Établissement public pour l'aménagement de la région de la Défense (EPAD) reserved two areas destined to hold two future Metro stations on the axis intended to be served by the line. "La Défense – Michelet" and "Élysées – La Défense" are situated under the neighbourhood of Michelet and the apartment building Élysée Défense, respectively.

However, as a result of the planning for the expansion, which was not completed until the 1990s, the complexity and the cost of an under-river crossing in this area was judged to be too prohibitive to complete. Instead, the crossing of the Seine was achieved by passing over the pont de Neuilly, and not in a tunnel as had previously been planned. Thus, the two areas reserved for these stations are not serviced and remain accessible only via a trap door five floors below ground level in an underground parking lot. The current tunnel (and Esplanade station) was realized in part by the number of lanes on the A14 autoroute, which were reduced to 2×2 instead of 3×3, as had previously been planned.

"Orly-Sud" was conceived at the same time as Terminal 4 (then the South Terminal) by its architect, Henri Vicariot, and was dug out under the terminal building in preparation of a future expansion of Metro Line 7 to this location. However, no such expansion ever occurred, and the automated light metro shuttle Orlyval instead opened in 1997, above ground, without using the location that had been reserved for the Metro station underneath. Line 14 used a new station, which is highly likely to be shared with upcoming Line 18, and the original station now sits as a simple box for more than half a century.

== See also ==
- List of Paris Metro stations
