= Neuilly (disambiguation) =

Places named Neuilly

Neuilly refers to Neuilly-sur-Seine, a wealthy suburb immediately west of Paris.

Neuilly may also refer to:

Place	postal code	Département
Neuilly, Eure	27730	Eure
Neuilly, Nièvre	58420	Nièvre
Neuilly, Yonne	89113	Yonne
Neuilly-en-Donjon	03130	Allier
Neuilly-en-Dun	18600	Cher
Neuilly-en-Sancerre	18250	Cher
Neuilly-en-Thelle	60530	Oise
Neuilly-en-Vexin	95640	Val-d'Oise
Neuilly-la-Forêt	14230	Calvados
Neuilly-le-Bisson	61250	Orne
Neuilly-le-Brignon	37160	Indre-et-Loire
Neuilly-le-Dien	80150	Somme
Neuilly-le-Réal	03340	Allier
Neuilly-le-Vendin	53250	Mayenne
Neuilly-lès-Dijon	21800	Côte-d'Or
Neuilly-l'Évêque	52360	Haute-Marne
Neuilly-l'Hôpital	80132	Somme
Neuilly-Plaisance	93360	Seine-Saint-Denis
Neuilly-Saint-Front	02470	Aisne
Neuilly-sous-Clermont	60290	Oise
Neuilly-sur-Eure	61290	Orne
Neuilly-sur-Marne	93330	Seine-Saint-Denis
Neuilly-sur-Seine	92200	Hauts-de-Seine
Neuilly-sur-Suize	52000	Haute-Marne
Vacognes-Neuilly	14210	Calvados

== See also ==
- Neuilly–Porte Maillot station, an RER station in Neuilly-sur-Seine
- Pont de Neuilly station, a Paris Metro station in Neuilly-sur-Seine
- Pont de Neuilly, bridge in Neuilly-sur-Seine
