= Les Sablons station =

Paris Métro station in Neuilly-sur-Seine

Les Sablons Jardin d'Acclimatation
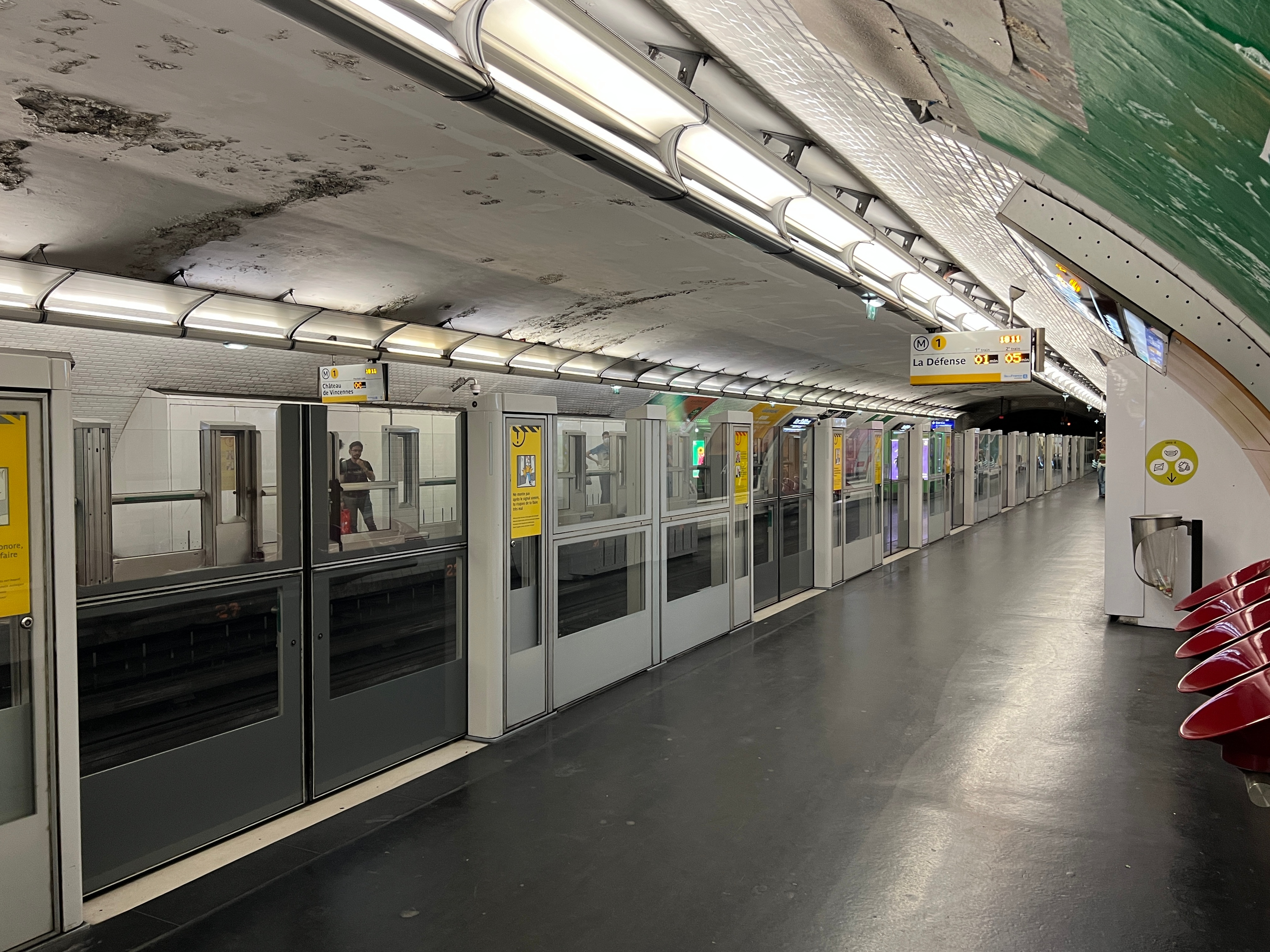
- Platforms

General information
- Location: 52, av. Charles de Gaulle; 70, av. Charles de Gaulle; 85, av. Charles de Gaulle; 103, av. Charles de Gaulle; Neuilly-sur-Seine; Île-de-France; France
- Coordinates: 48°52′51″N 2°16′20″E
- Owner: RATP
- Operator: RATP

Other information
- Fare zone: 2

History
- Opened: 29 April 1937; 89 years ago

Services
Preceding station	Paris Metro	Following station
Pont de Neuilly towards La Défense	Line 1	Porte Maillot towards Château de Vincennes
Route map
Location
- Location within Paris

Les Sablons (French pronunciation: [le sablɔ̃]) is a station on Line 1 of the Paris Métro in the commune of Neuilly-sur-Seine west of the city. In 2019 Les Sablons ranked 53rd in passenger volume among the system's 302 stations. The station is located under Avenue Charles de Gaulle, a major traffic artery between Etoile and La Defense. It has four entrances, a pair located on each of the medians on opposite sides of the Avenue.

== Location ==
The name of the station was taken from the Boulevard des Sablons which connects the station area with the northern entrance to the Bois de Boulogne. The name of the Boulevard derived from the Plaine des Sablons, as much of present-day Neuilly was known prior to its urbanization. The station signage is subtitled "Jardin d'Acclimatation," referring to the leisure park in the Bois de Boulogne 300 meters to the south.

== History ==
The station opened on 29 April 1937, when Line 1 of the Paris Metro was extended west from Porte Maillot to Pont de Neuilly under Neuilly's principal commercial thoroughfare, the Avenue de Neuilly (renamed Avenue Charles de Gaulle in 1971). At the same time, the Avenue was significantly widened to serve as an arterial route for automobile traffic, and the project marked the end of the Fête de Neuilly, a summer street carnival held for over a century in what had become a well-heeled urban district. Initial planning in the early 1930s envisaged two stations between Porte Maillot and Pont de Neuilly, at Place du Marché and Rue St. Pierre, but Les Sablons was built instead. Work on the Line 1 extension was pressed to completion in time for the 1937 International Exposition. In the 1970s the station was remodeled in the style Andreu-Motte. In 2003, the corridors were remodeled as part of a system-wide program. In 2009, the platforms were fitted with platform screen doors in anticipation of the fully-automated operation of Line 1.

Prior to its urbanization, much of the area immediately to the north of the Bois de Boulogne was known as the Plaine des Sablons, for its sterile soil and sand pits whose output was much used in the construction of Paris. In the 1780s, Louis XVI granted part of the Champs des Sablons, an area used for training by the King's Guards, to Antoine-Augustin Parmentier, who demonstrated the growing of potatoes, and promoted their acceptance in continental Europe as safe for human consumption. During the 19th century, this rural area gave way to suburban, then urban, development. To the east of the station is the Marché des Sablons and the neighborhood of Sablonville, originally platted in the 1830s for suburban villas.

The Jardin d'Acclimatation opened in 1860 on 20 hectares in the northwest corner of the Bois de Boulogne, as a feature in the transformation of the Bois from public woodlands into an urban park. The Jardin was initially a zoo and botanical garden emphasizing species from tropical and sub-tropical regions. From 1877 to 1927 it also included an "ethnological garden", a human zoo featuring the physiques and cultures of non-European indigenous peoples. After 1910, there was increased focus on carnival rides and entertainments, following the example of Copenhagen's Tivoli Gardens. These, in turn, were displaced in the 1950s in favor of an area "for walks and outdoor activities of an instructional, sporting, and family nature", and in the 1960s and '70s the Jardin featured popular, rural, and traditional French culture. In recent years, amusements and wild animals have returned to what is now a family-oriented leisure park, focusing on children's activities. The original name has never changed.

== Passenger services ==
=== Access ===
The station has four entrances divided into five metro entrances decorated with Dervaux-style balustrades, established on the side medians of Avenue Charles-de-Gaulle:

- 1 - Rue Louis-Philippe including a fixed staircase leading to the right of nos. 66 and 68 of the avenue and an escalator going up in front of no. 64;
- 2 - Jardin d'Acclimatation, consisting of a fixed staircase, located to the right of no. 103 of the avenue;
- 3 - Rue Jacques-Dulud, also consisting of a fixed staircase, located opposite no. 85 of the avenue;
- 4 - Place du Marché, consisting of a fixed staircase, leading to the right of no. 52 of the avenue.

The station is one of the few in the network to have no mast indicating the presence of its entrances, which are only equipped with information boards.

=== Station layout ===
Street Level

B1	Mezzanine for platform connection

B2; Platforms	Side platform with PSDs, doors will open on the right
B2; Platforms	Westbound	← toward La Défense – Grande Arche (Pont de Neuilly)
B2; Platforms	Eastbound	toward Château de Vincennes (Porte Maillot)→
B2; Platforms	Side platform with PSDs, doors will open on the right

=== Platforms ===
Les Sablons is a standard station. It has two 105-metre-long platforms separated by the metro tracks and the vault is elliptical. The decoration is in the style used for the majority of metro stations, combined with the specific layouts of this line since its automation. The lighting canopies are white and rounded in the Gaudin style of the metro renovation of the 2000s, and the beveled white ceramic tiles cover the walls and tunnel exits, while the vault is painted white. The advertising frames are made of white ceramic tiles and the name of the station is inscribed in Parisine font on backlit panels incorporated into wooden boxes. The platforms are equipped with red Akiko seats as well as half-height platform screen doors.

=== Bus connections ===
The station is served by bus lines 43, 73, 82 and 174 of the RATP bus network and by lines N11 and N24 of the Noctilien night bus service.

== Places of interest ==
- The entrances to the aforementioned Bois de Boulogne and Jardin d'Acclimatation are 300 meters south of the station.
- The Fondation Louis Vuitton (2014), the Frank Gehry-designed art museum and cultural center in the Bois, sponsored by the LVMH group, are 600 meters further.
- Adjacent to the Fondation Louis Vuitton is the former Musée national des Arts et Traditions populaires (1973), a high-rise museum and office building designed by Jean Dubuisson. The Musée was later absorbed by the Musée des Civilisations de l'Europe et de la Méditerranée (MuCEM) and its collections and staff transferred to Marseilles. LVMH signed an agreement in 2017 to renovate and operate the building as a cultural center: La Maison LVMH – Arts, Talents, Patrimoine.
- The head offices of the M6 television channel adjoin the station at 89 avenue Charles-de-Gaulle. Those of its radio affiliate, RTL, are opposite at no. 56.
- 300 meters northeast of the station along the Avenue du Roule are Neuilly's major public buildings erected in the latter 19th century, among them the municipal town hall, Église Saint-Pierre, and the Groupe scolaire du Roule.

== Gallery ==
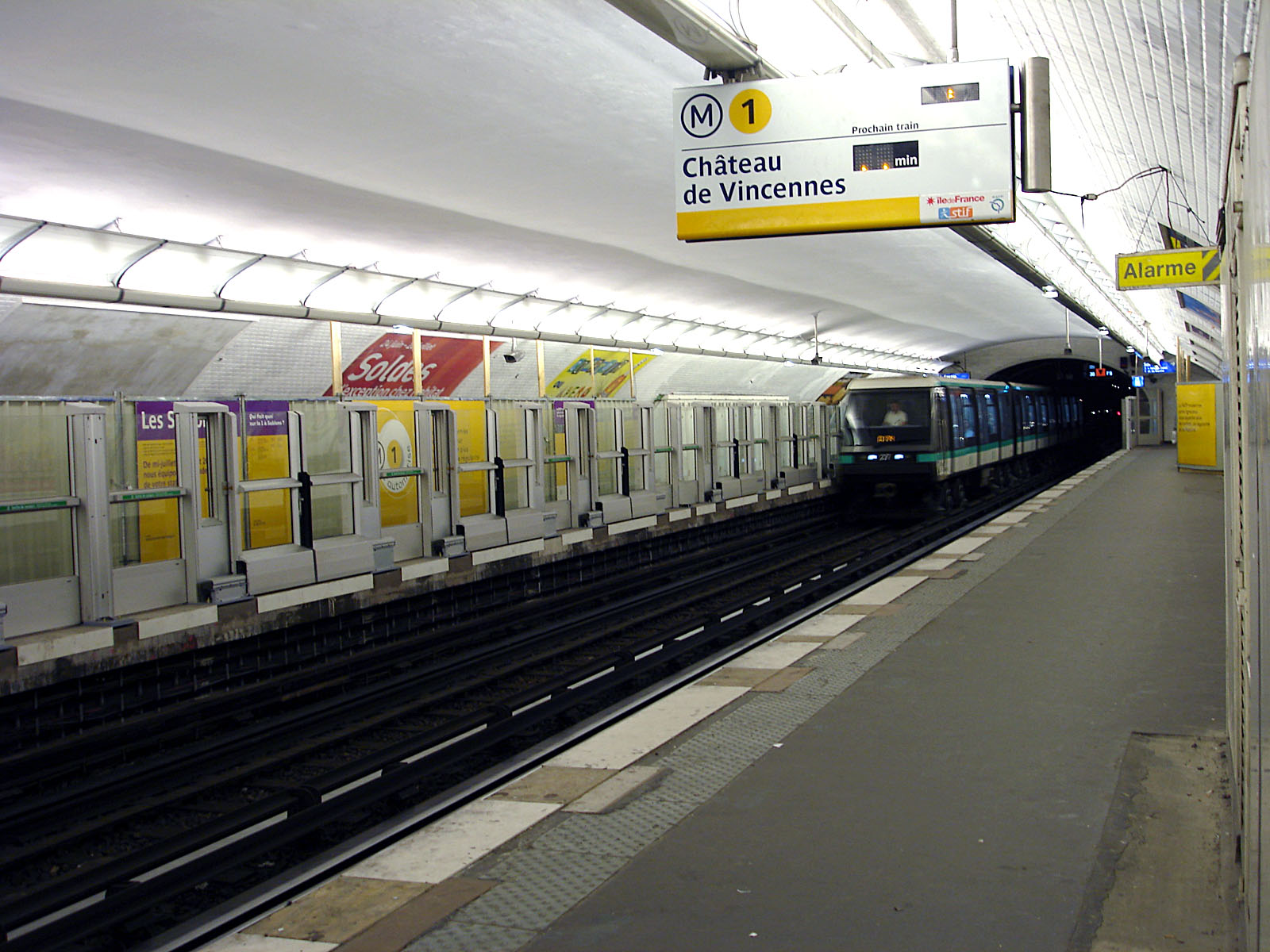
MP 89 rolling stock arriving at Les Sablons. Note the automatic platform gates on the westbound platform

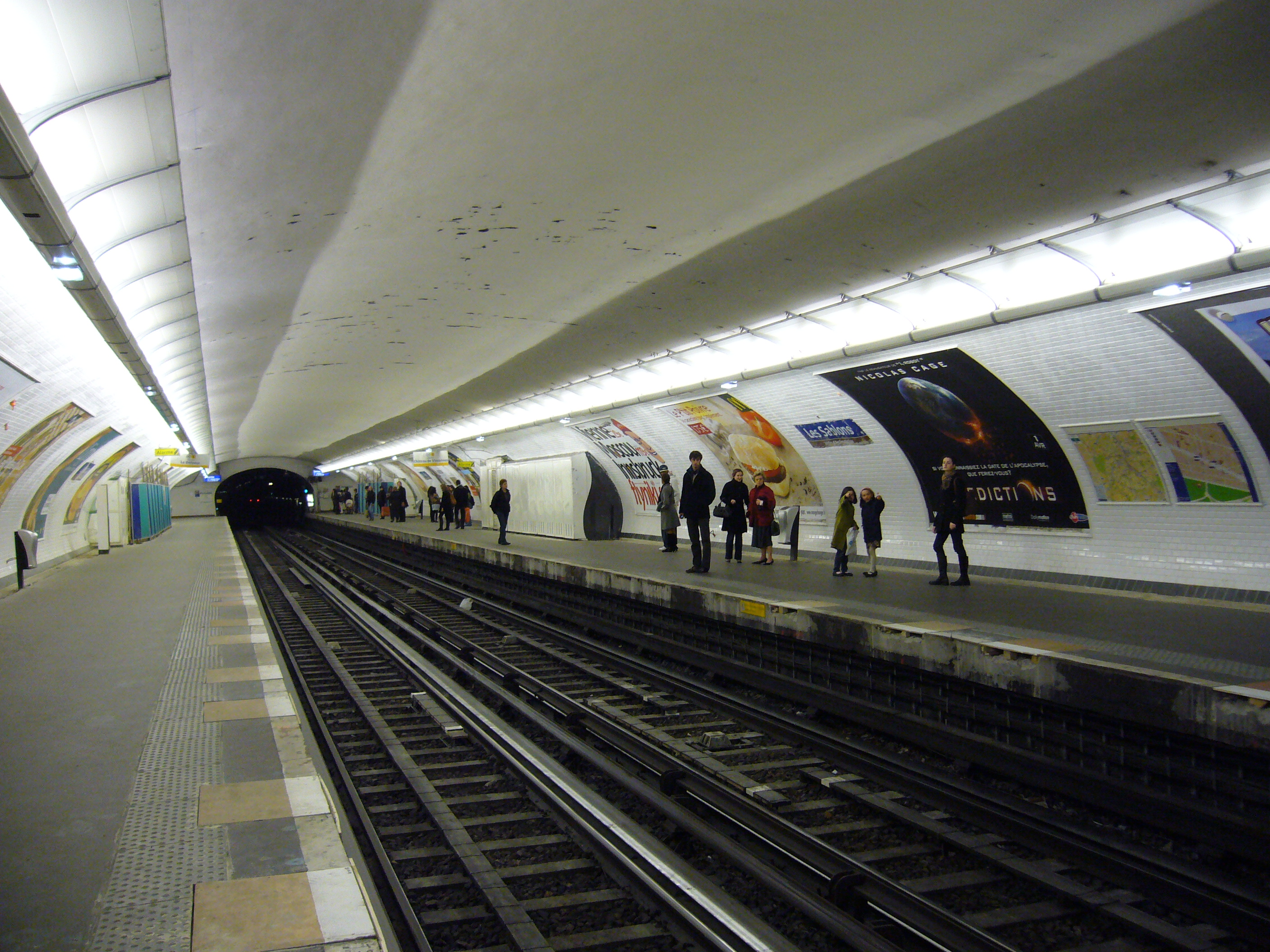
Eastbound view at Les Sablons prior to the Line 1 automation programme
