= Esplanade de La Défense station =

Metro station in Paris, France

Esplanade de La Défense
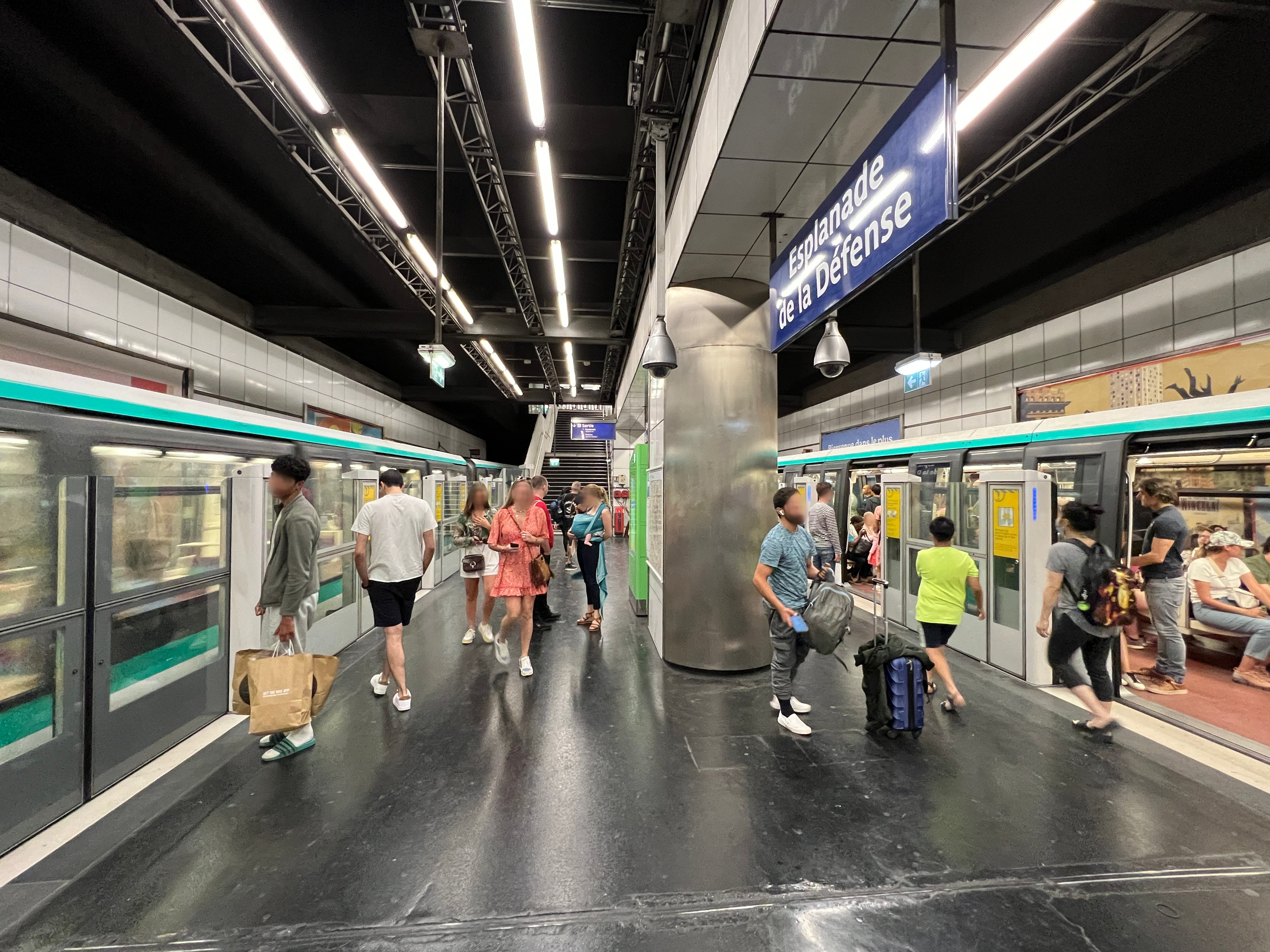

General information
- Location: 21, voie des Bâtisseurs; Voie des Sculpteurs; Parvis de l'Esplanade; Courbevoie/Puteaux; Île-de-France; France
- Coordinates: 48°53′18″N 2°15′0″E
- Owner: RATP
- Operator: RATP
- Line: Line 1

Construction
- Accessible: yes

Other information
- Fare zone: 2–3

History
- Opened: 1 April 1992; 34 years ago

Passengers
- 10 148 031 (2017) – (19th out of 303)

Services
Preceding station	Paris Metro	Following station
La Défense Terminus	Line 1	Pont de Neuilly towards Château de Vincennes
Route map
Location
- Location within Paris

Esplanade de La Défense (French pronunciation: [ɛsplanad d(ə) la defɑ̃s]) is a station on Paris Métro Line 1 on the outskirts of La Défense on the border of Courbevoie and Puteaux. It has an island platform because of limitations on space due it being enclosed in a site originally earmarked for one of the underpasses of the A14 autoroute (which runs through La Défense underground).

== History ==
The station was opened on 1 April 1992 as part of the western extension of the line from Pont de Neuilly to La Défense. The project name was Puteaux - Courbevoie.

The RATP having preferred an open-air passage on the Neuilly bridge, less expensive, rather than a tunnel under the Seine, with the station La Défense - Michelet, planned since the 1970s by the EPAD, remained unused.

As part of the automation work on line 1, the Esplanade de la Défense station was equipped with platform screen doors during October 2009.

In 2019, according to RATP estimates, 9,883,008 passengers entered this station, which places it in the 17th position of metro stations for its usage out of 302.

In 2020, with the Covid-19 crisis, 4,488,878 passengers entered this station which places it in the 24th position of metro stations for its attendance.

In 2021, attendance gradually increases, with 4,708,183 passengers entering this station which places it in the 43rd position of metro stations for its attendance.

== Passenger services ==
=== Access ===
The station has two accesses:

- west exit gives access to the Vosges, Alsace, Corolles, Reflets and Iris districts of the Esplanade Nord sector and to the Michelet and Villon districts of the Esplanade Sud sector;
- the east exit gives access to the Saisons district of the Esplanade Nord sector and to the Bellini district of the Esplanade Sud sector.

=== Station layout ===
G	Street Level	Exits/Entrances
M	Mezzanine	to Exits/Entrances
B2; Platforms	Westbound	← toward La Défense – Grande Arche (Terminus)
B2; Platforms	Island platform with PSDs, doors will open on the left
B2; Platforms	Eastbound	toward Château de Vincennes (Pont de Neuilly)→

=== Platforms ===
The station has a central platform due to the small width of the station, which was built in what was originally to be one of the two tubes of the A14 autoroute (which passes through a tunnel under The Defence). A slight difference in width also exists between the western end of the platform, through which access is made, and the eastern one, narrower and under a lower ceiling covered with a black fireproof flocking. Lighting is provided by fluorescent tubes. Large white flat tiles cover the vertical walls. The advertising frames are metallic and the name of the station is inscribed in Parisine font on enamelled plates arranged only on the platform. The latter is equipped with yellow Akiko seats and platform screen doors.

=== Bus connections ===
The station is served by bus lines 73, 157, 158, 174, 175 and 176 of the RATP Bus Network and by line N24 of the Noctilien night bus service.

== Nearby ==
In the courtyard entrance to this station and in the corridors of it, statues have been erected. At the end of the platform, in the direction of Paris, the station is almost open-air. It allows you to see the Arc de Triomphe and is visible from the bus station at the Pont de Neuilly metro station. The cultural and exhibition space Defacto la Gallery, opened in September 2008, is located at the eastern exit of the station. The station gives access to the Tour First, and the Tour CB21 and Allianz One towers.

== Gallery ==
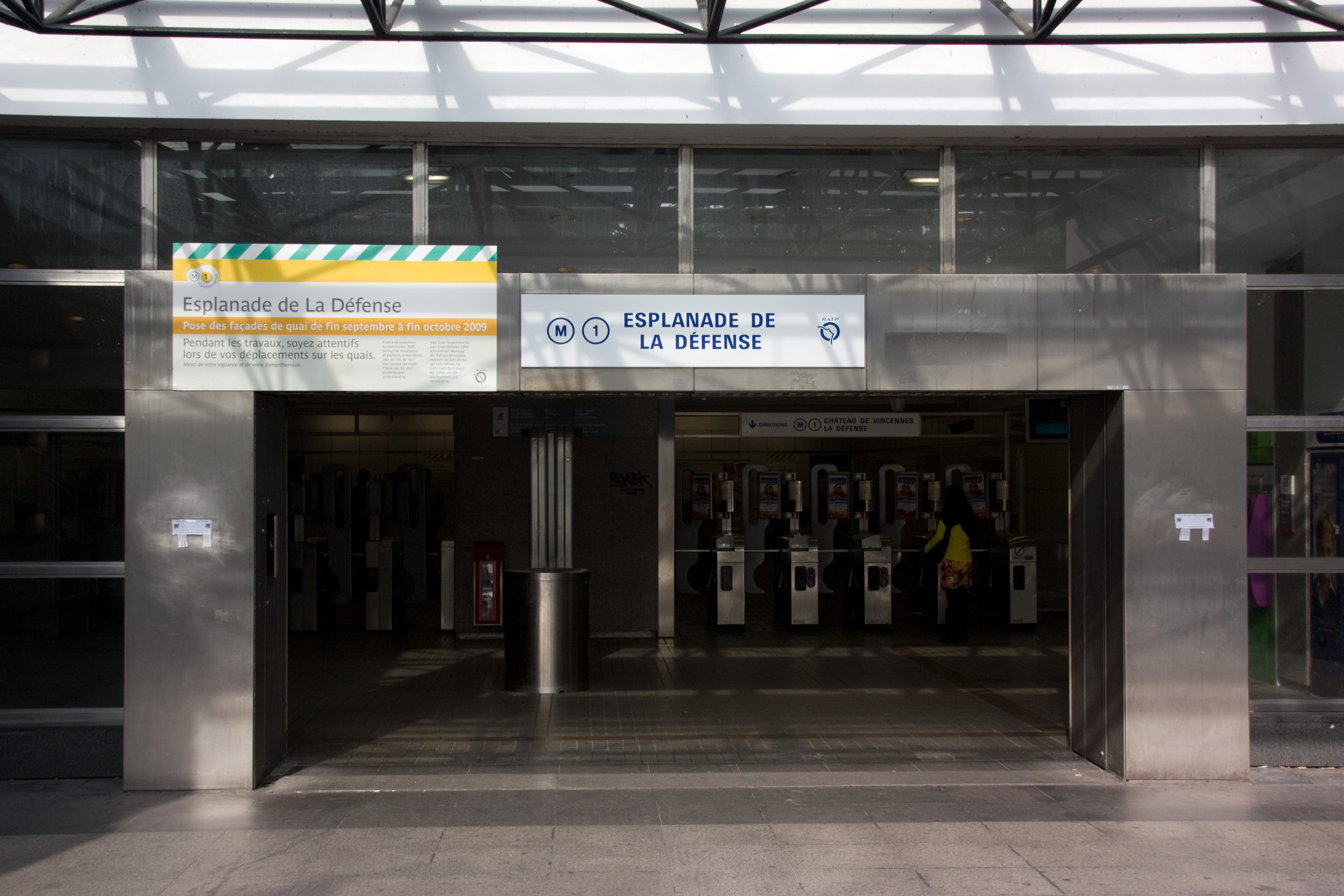
Eastern entrance

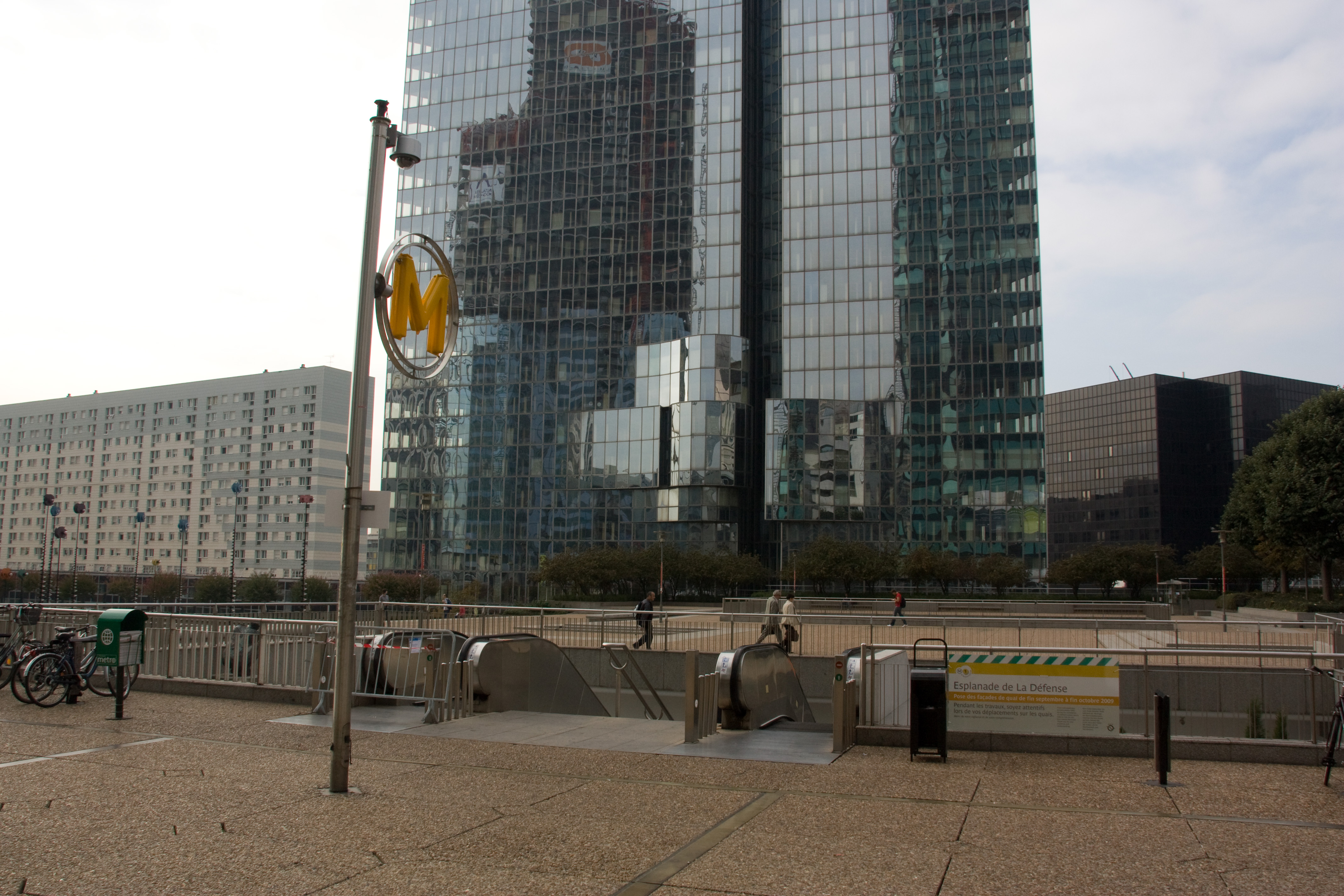
Western entrance

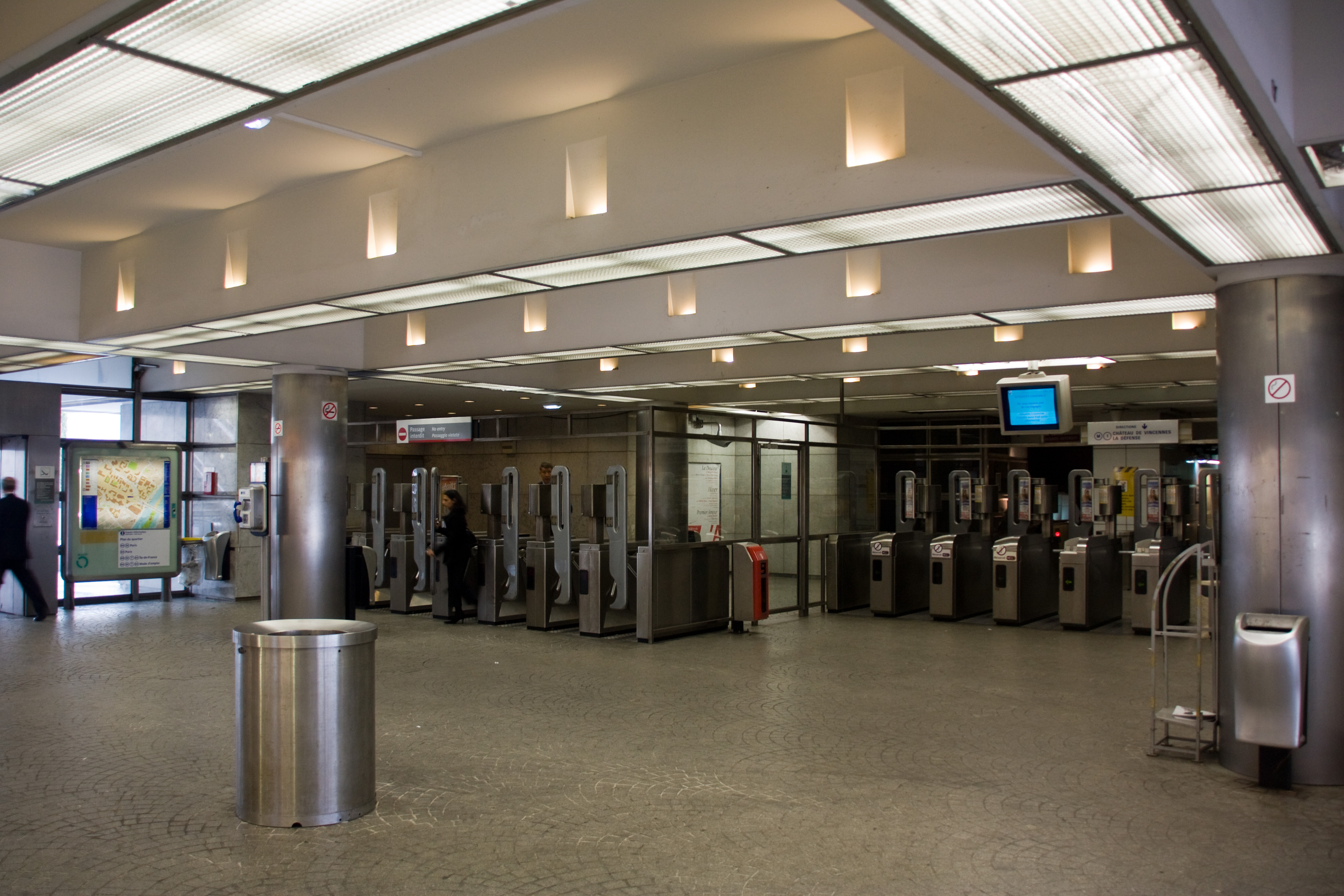
Ticket hall

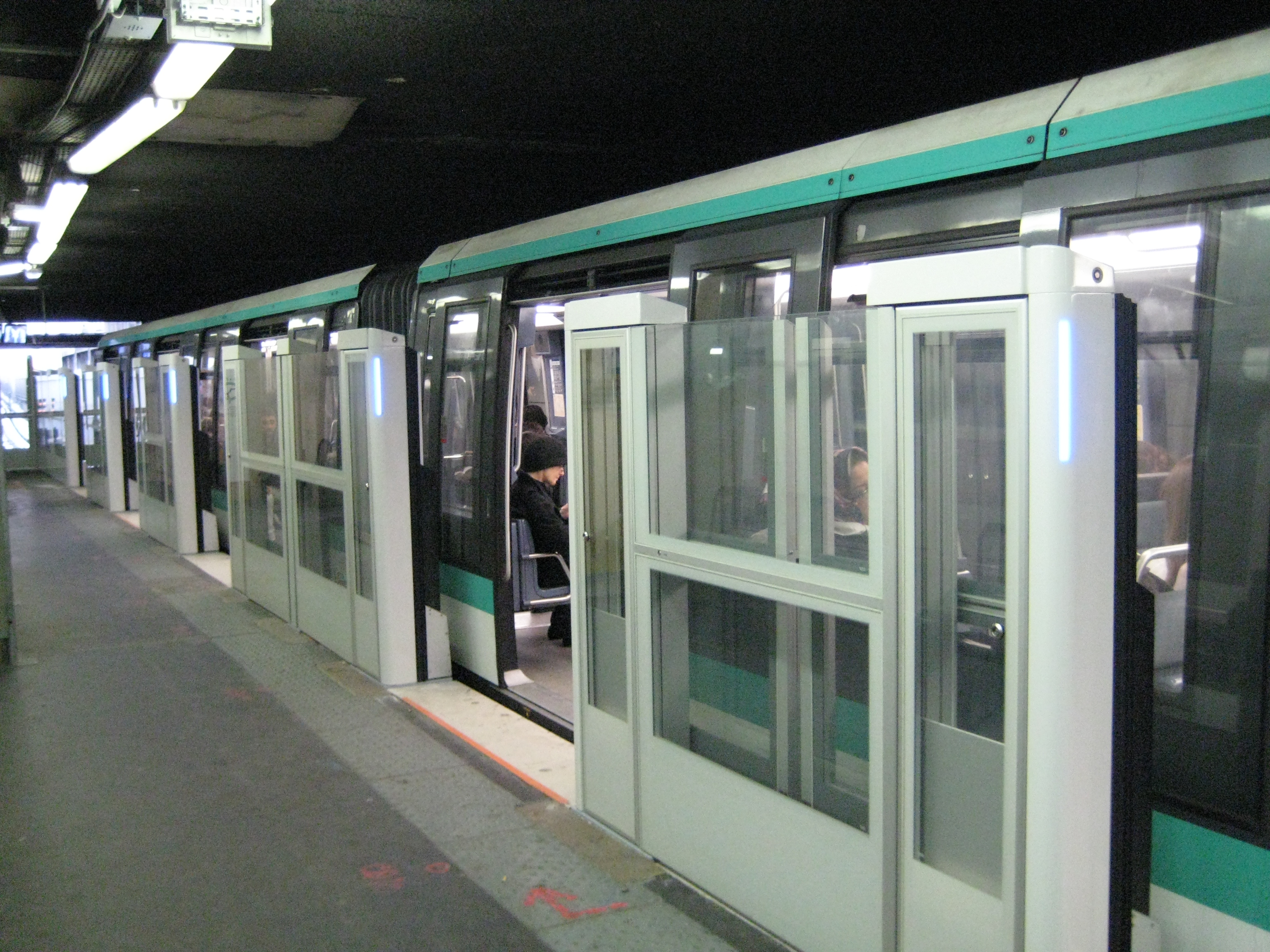
Eastbound platform (looking east)

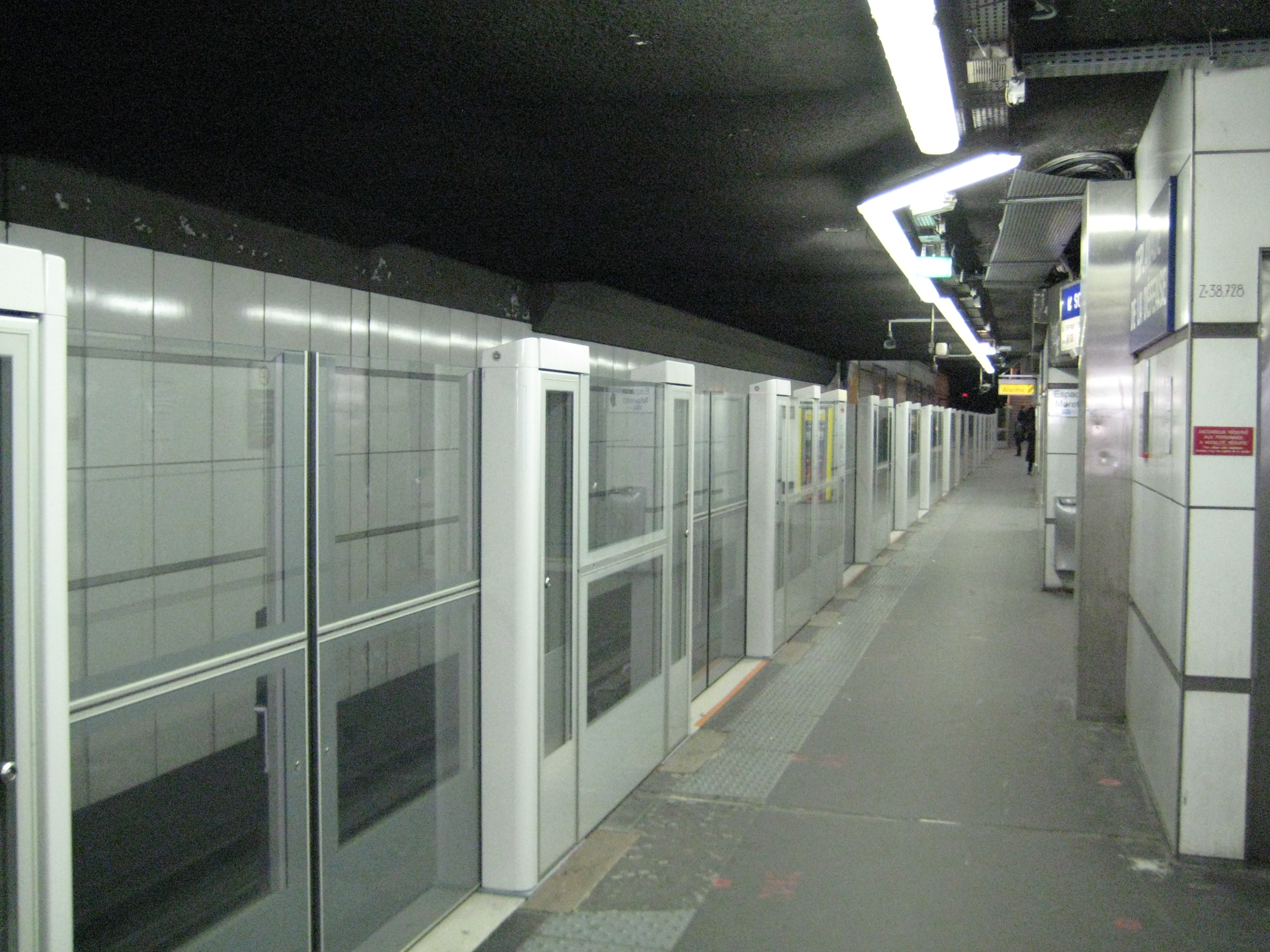
Eastbound platform (looking west)

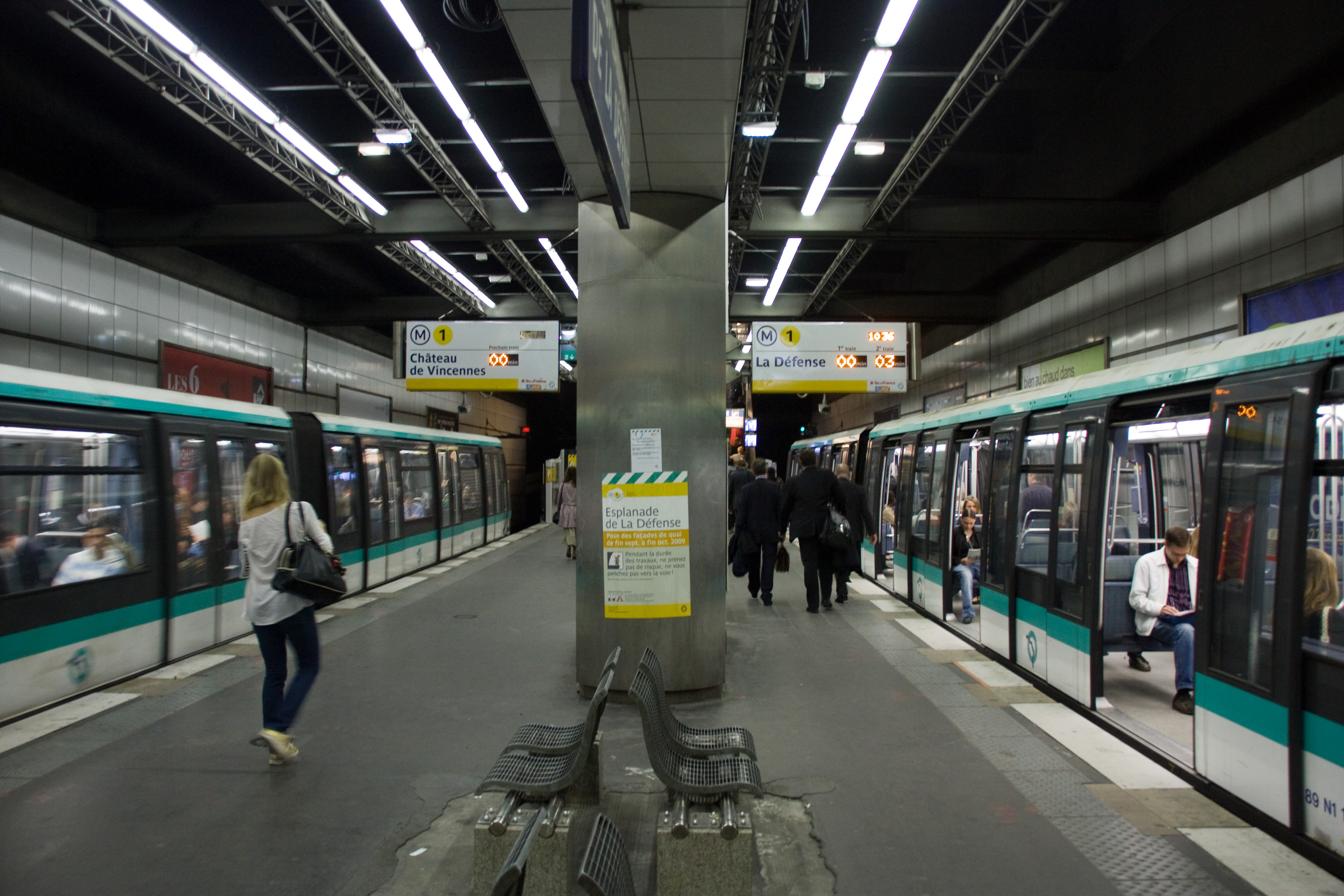
Westbound view prior to installation of platform-edge doors
