= Elysées La Défense station =

Unopened metro station in Paris, France

Coordinates: 48°53′28″N 2°14′17″E

Élysées–La Défense (or Élysée–La Défense or La Défense–Élysée) is an aborted project for the construction of a station on the Paris Métro.

== History ==
During the 1970s, as a result of the construction of a number of buildings in La Défense, the Établissement public pour l'aménagement de la région de La Défense (EPAD) planned for an extension of line 1 to the west. It therefore reserved a space under the foundations of some buildings which would permit for the construction of two stations, La Défense–Michelet and Élysées–La Défense.

In 1992, while the RATP expanded the metro line, it ruled out a passage under the Seine, possibly 20 years early than the EPAD. It preferred instead to expand the line above the Seine, specifically by using the Pont de Neuilly, this was cheaper and more practical, as the basements were occupied by the RER A line.

The new route in use today uses the station La Défense, about 100 m to the northwest of Élysées–La Défense.

No access was ever constructed to the station and today it is only a pocket of concrete accessible only via a trap door five levels below the building Élysées–La Défense.

The station could possibly be used in the expansion of RER E towards the west.
