= Albert de Bailliencourt =

French politician

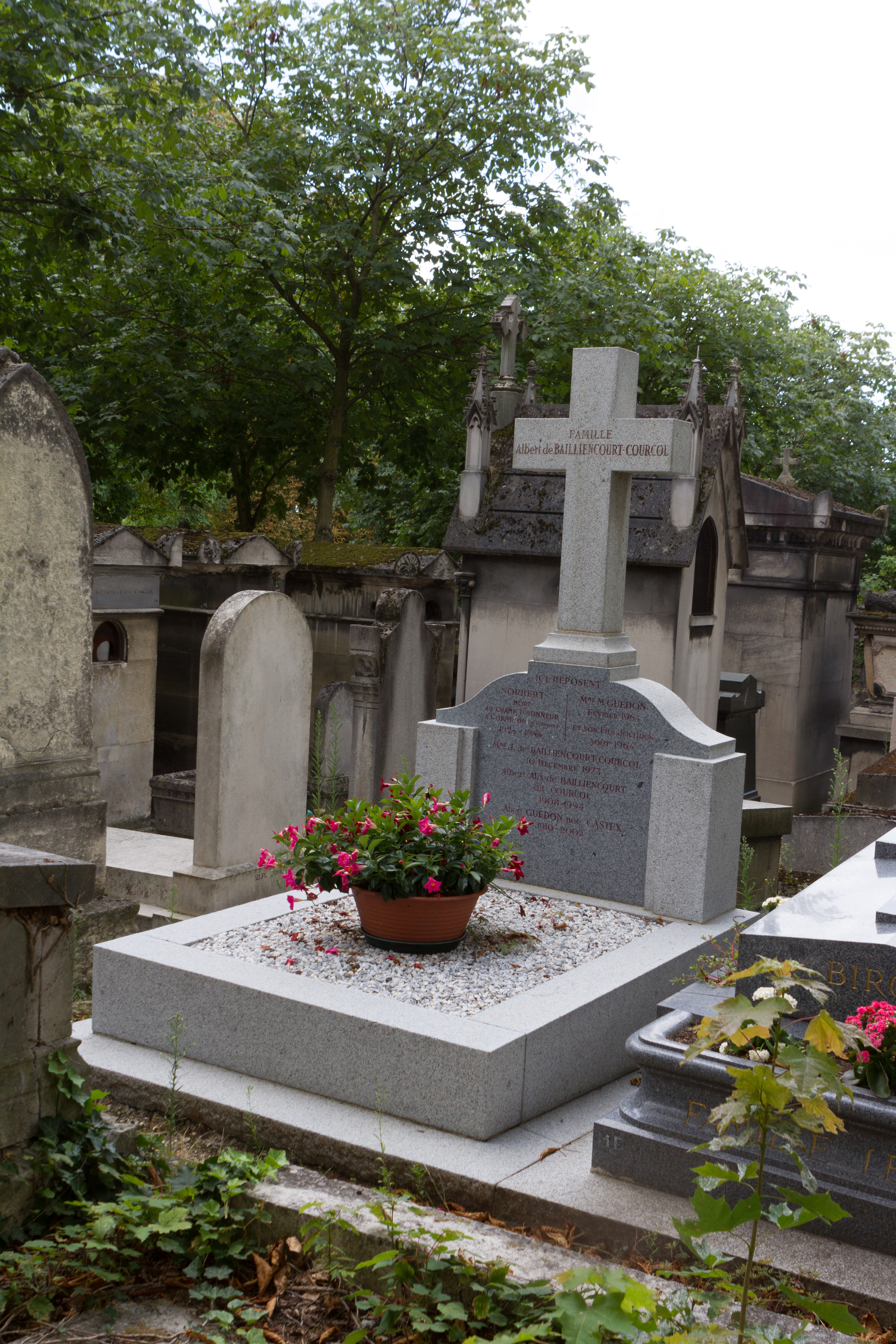
Père-Lachaise Cemetery.

Albert de Bailliencourt (30 March 1908, Neuilly-sur-Seine - 28 May 1994) was a French politician. He represented the Radical Party in the National Assembly from 1956 to 1958.

== Bibliography ==
- http://www.assemblee-nationale.fr/sycomore/
