= Neuilly-sur-Seine =

- Commune
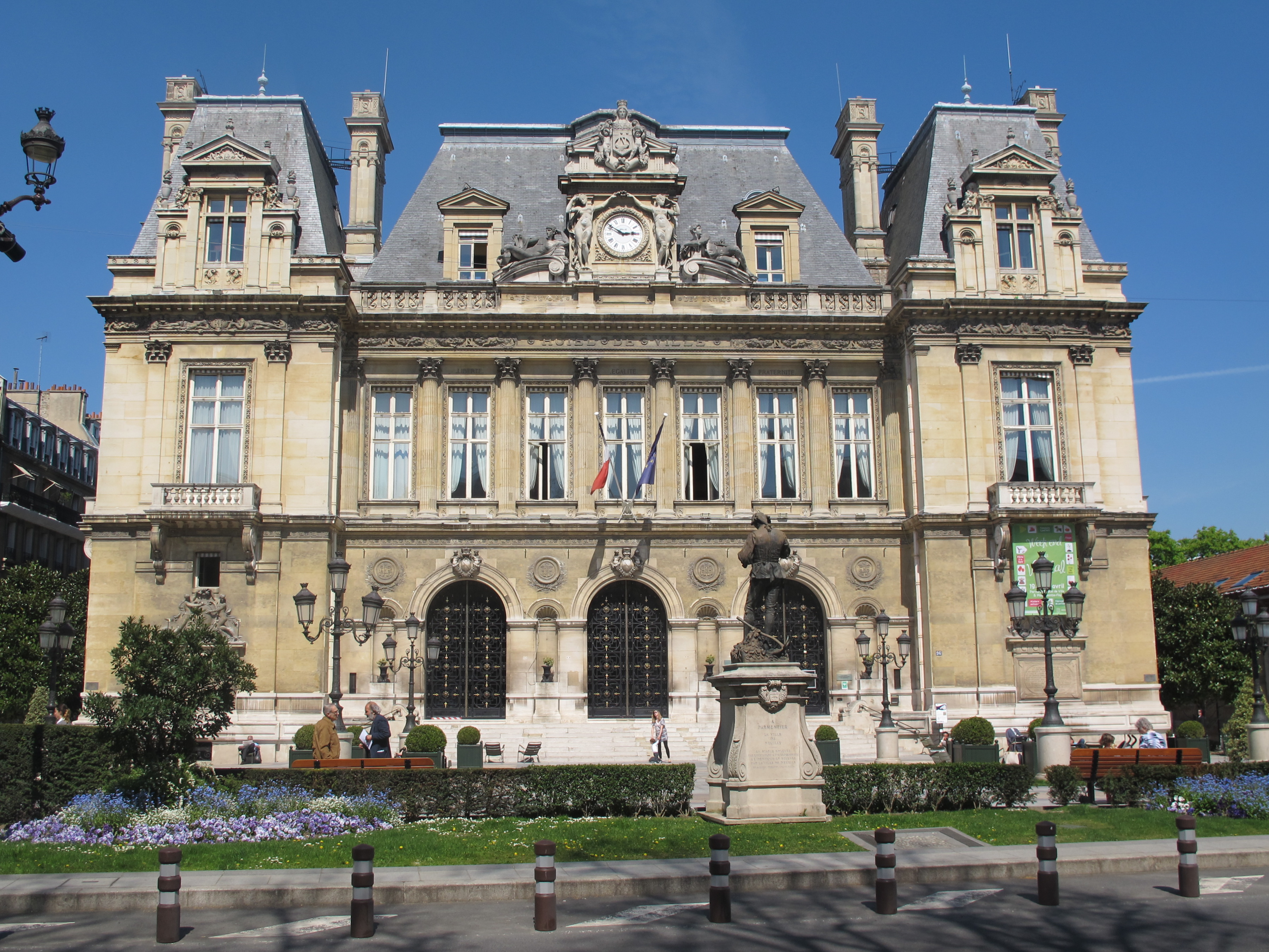
- The Hôtel de Ville (town hall)

- Coat of arms

- Location (in red) within Paris inner suburbs
- Location of Neuilly-sur-Seine
- Location within France Location within Île-de-France (region)
- Coordinates: 48°53′17″N 2°16′07″E
- Country: France
- Region: Île-de-France
- Department: Hauts-de-Seine
- Arrondissement: Nanterre
- Canton: Neuilly-sur-Seine
- Intercommunality: Grand Paris

Government
  - Mayor (2026–32): Jean-Christophe Fromantin (DVD)
- Area^{1}: 3.73 km^{2} (1.44 sq mi)
- Highest elevation: 39 m (128 ft)
- Lowest elevation: 27 m (89 ft)
- Population (2023): 59,538
  - Density: 16,000/km^{2} (41,300/sq mi)
- Time zone: UTC+01:00 (CET)
  - Summer (DST): UTC+02:00 (CEST)
- INSEE/Postal code: 92051 /92200
- ^{1} French Land Register data, which excludes lakes, ponds, glaciers > 1 km^{2} (0.386 sq mi or 247 acres) and river estuaries.

Neuilly-sur-Seine (French pronunciation: [nøji syʁ sɛn]; lit. 'Neuilly-on-Seine'), also known simply as Neuilly, is an urban commune in Hauts-de-Seine, Île-de-France, France. An immediate western suburb of Paris, it is physically separated from the capital centre only by the Périphérique to its east and the Bois de Boulogne to its south.

Neuilly is mainly made up of residential neighborhoods and hosts several corporate headquarters and foreign embassies. One of the most affluent areas of France, it is the wealthiest and most expensive suburb of Paris. If Neuilly is grouped together with the city's adjacent 16th and 17th arrondissements, they form the most affluent residential area in the country.

== History ==
Originally, Pont de Neuilly was a small hamlet under the jurisdiction of Villiers, a larger settlement mentioned in medieval sources as early as 832 and now absorbed by the commune of Levallois-Perret. It was not until 1222 that the little settlement of Neuilly, established on the banks of the Seine, was mentioned for the first time in a charter of the Abbey of Saint-Denis: the name was recorded in Medieval Latin as Portus de Lulliaco, meaning "Port of Lulliacum". In 1224 another charter of Saint-Denis recorded the name as Lugniacum. By 1226, the settlement was also referred to as Luingni in medieval records.

In 1316, however, in a ruling of the parlement of Paris, the name was recorded as Nully. During the 14th century, the settlement was also referred to as Nulliacum, while the name alternated between Luny and Nullybefore eventually evolving into Neuilly.

Various explanations and etymologies have been proposed to explain these discrepancies in the names of Neuilly recorded over the centuries. The original name of Neuilly may have been Lulliacum or Lugniacum, which may later have evolved into Nulliacum / Nully. Some interpret Lulliacum or Lugniacum as meaning "estate of Lullius (or Lunius)", probably a Gallo-Roman landowner. This interpretation is based on a common pattern in French place names, many of which derive from the name Gallo-Roman landowners combined with the suffix "-acum".

Other researchers, however, object that it is unlikely that Neuilly owes its name to a Gallo-Roman patronym, because during the Roman occupation of Gaul the area of Neuilly was inside the large Forest of Rouvray, of which the Bois de Boulogne is all that remains today, and was probably not a settlement. These researchers contend that it is only after the fall of the Roman Empire and the Germanic invasions that the area of Neuilly was deforested and settled. Thus, they think that the name Lulliacum or Lugniacum comes from the ancient Germanic word lund meaning "forest", akin to Old Norse lundr meaning "grove", to which the placename suffix "-acum" was added. The Old Norse word lundr has indeed left many placenames across Europe, such as the city of Lund in Sweden, the Forest of the Londe in Normandy, or the many English placenames containing "lound", "lownde", or "lund" in their name, or ending in "-land". This interesting theory, however, fails to explain why the "d" of lund is missing in Lulliacum or Lugniacum.

Concerning the discrepancy in names over the centuries, the most probable explanation is that the original name Lulliacum or Lugniacum was later corrupted into Nulliacum / Nully by inversion of the consonants, perhaps under the influence of an old Celtic word meaning "swampy land, boggy land" (as was the land around Neuilly-sur-Seine in ancient times) which is found in the name of many French places anciently covered with water, such as Noue, Noë, Nouan, Nohant, etc. Or perhaps the consonants were simply inverted under the influence of the many settlements of France called Neuilly (a frequent place name whose etymology is completely different from the special case of Neuilly-sur-Seine).

Until the French Revolution, the settlement was often referred to as Port-Neuilly, but at the creation of French communes in 1790 the "Port" was dropped and the newly born commune was named simply Neuilly.

On 1 January 1860, the city of Paris was enlarged by annexing neighbouring communes. On that occasion, a part of the territory of Neuilly-sur-Seine was annexed by the city of Paris, and forms now the neighbourhood of Ternes, in the 17th arrondissement of Paris.

On 11 January 1867, part of the territory of Neuilly-sur-Seine was detached and merged with part of Clichy to create the commune of Levallois-Perret.

On 4 June 1878, the Synagogue de Neuilly was founded on Rue Ancelle, the oldest synagogue in the Paris suburbs.

On 2 May 1897, the commune name officially became Neuilly-sur-Seine (meaning "Neuilly upon Seine"), in order to distinguish it from the many communes of France also called Neuilly. Most people, however, continue to refer to Neuilly-sur-Seine as simply "Neuilly". During the 1900 Summer Olympics, it hosted the basque pelota events.

The American Hospital of Paris was founded in 1906.

In 1919, the Treaty of Neuilly was signed with Bulgaria in Neuilly-sur-Seine to conclude its role in World War I.

In 1929, the Bois de Boulogne, which was previously divided between the communes of Neuilly-sur-Seine and Boulogne-Billancourt, was annexed in its entirety by the city of Paris.

== Politics ==
Neuilly used to be one of the most right-wing towns in France, regularly voting for the candidate of the traditional right by landslide margins. Former president Nicolas Sarkozy was mayor of Neuilly from 1983 to 2007. Amidst a poor national showing of 20%, Neuilly gave right-wing candidate François Fillon 65% of its vote in the first round of the 2017 presidential election.

In more recent elections, which have tended to be polarized between Emmanuel Macron's centrist coalition and the right-populist National Rally, Neuilly has broken for Macronist parties like En Marche! and Ensemble instead.

| Election | Winning candidate | Party | % |
|---|---|---|---|
| 2022 R2 | Emmanuel Macron | EM | 82.58 |
| 2017 R2 | Emmanuel Macron | EM | 88.78 |
| 2017 R1 | François Fillon | LR | 65 |
| 2012 R2 | Nicolas Sarkozy | UMP | 84.20 |
| 2007 R2 | Nicolas Sarkozy | UMP | 86.81 |
| 2002 R2 | Jacques Chirac | RPR | 88.57 |
| 1995 R2 | Jacques Chirac | RPR | 85.88 |
| 1981 R2 | Valéry Giscard d'Estaing | UDF | 79.29 |

== Logos of the city council ==
Logo until 2022

Logo since 2022

== Population ==
The population data in the table and graph below refer to the commune of Neuilly-sur-Seine proper, in its geography at the given years. The commune of Neuilly-sur-Seine ceded part of its territory to the new commune of Levallois-Perret in 1866.

Historical population

| Year | Pop. | ±% p.a. |
|---|---|---|
| 1793 | 2,477 | — |
| 1800 | 1,573 | −6.28% |
| 1806 | 2,162 | +5.44% |
| 1821 | 2,744 | +1.60% |
| 1831 | 5,599 | +7.39% |
| 1836 | 7,654 | +6.45% |
| 1841 | 9,493 | +4.40% |
| 1846 | 13,063 | +6.59% |
| 1851 | 15,894 | +4.00% |
| 1856 | 23,583 | +8.21% |
| 1861 | 13,216 | −10.94% |
| 1866 | 17,545 | +5.83% |
| 1872 | 16,277 | −1.24% |
| 1876 | 20,781 | +6.30% |
| 1881 | 25,235 | +3.96% |
| 1886 | 26,596 | +1.06% |
| 1891 | 29,444 | +2.06% |
| 1896 | 32,730 | +2.14% |
| 1901 | 37,493 | +2.75% |

| Year | Pop. | ±% p.a. |
|---|---|---|
| 1906 | 41,145 | +1.88% |
| 1911 | 44,616 | +1.63% |
| 1921 | 51,590 | +1.46% |
| 1926 | 52,433 | +0.32% |
| 1931 | 53,491 | +0.40% |
| 1936 | 56,938 | +1.26% |
| 1946 | 60,172 | +0.55% |
| 1954 | 66,095 | +1.18% |
| 1962 | 72,773 | +1.21% |
| 1968 | 70,995 | −0.41% |
| 1975 | 65,983 | −1.04% |
| 1982 | 64,170 | −0.40% |
| 1990 | 61,768 | −0.48% |
| 1999 | 59,848 | −0.35% |
| 2007 | 60,454 | +0.13% |
| 2012 | 62,021 | +0.51% |
| 2017 | 60,361 | −0.54% |
| 2023 | 59,538 | −0.23% |

Source: EHESS and INSEE (1968-2023)

== Main sites ==
It was the site of the Château de Neuilly, an important royal residence during the July Monarchy. The Hôtel de Ville was completed in 1886.

== Transport ==
Neuilly-sur-Seine is served by the Paris Métro and the RER, Paris's regional rail network. Paris Métro Line 1 has three stations in the commune, all along Avenue Charles-de-Gaulle, which is part of the Axe historique: Porte Maillot, Les Sablons and Pont de Neuilly. RER C and E stop at Neuilly–Porte Maillot, which is connected to Porte Maillot on the Métro.

RATP, Paris's public transport operator, also operates bus services in the commune on lines 43, 73, 82, 93, 157, 158, 163, 164, and 174 during the day and N11 and N24 at night.

== Economy ==
Located near France's main business district La Défense, Neuilly-sur-Seine also hosts several corporate headquarters: Bureau Veritas, Chanel, Marathon Media, JCDecaux, Thales Group, M6 Group, Sephora, PricewaterhouseCoopers France, Parfums Christian Dior (in 2019), Orangina France, Grant Thornton International France.

== Organisations ==
The International Civil Aviation Organization (ICAO) has its European and North Atlantic (EUR/NAT) Office in Neuilly.

== Education ==
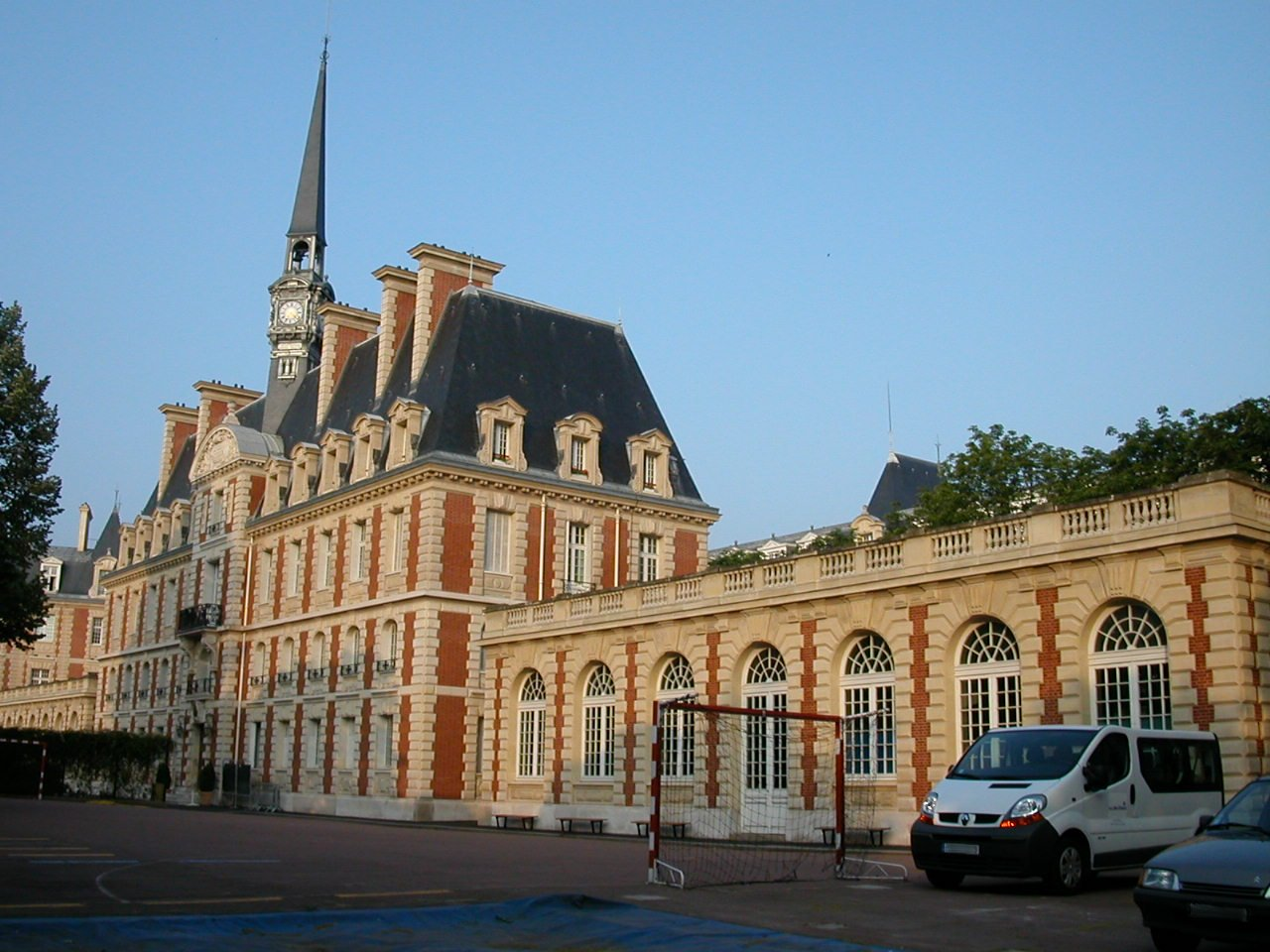
Collège et Lycée Pasteur

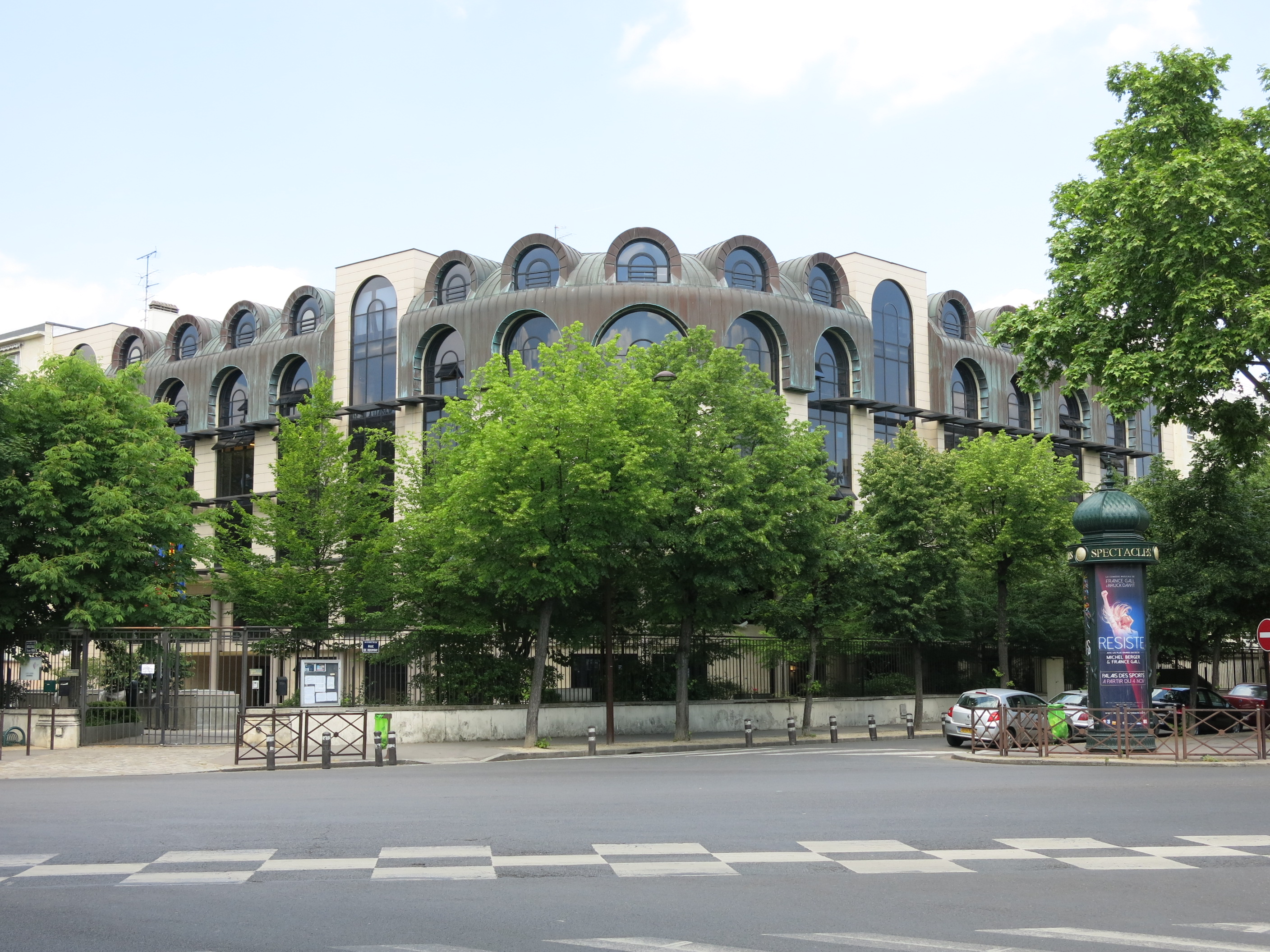
Liceo Español Luis Buñuel

Public schools in Neuilly:

- Eight écoles maternelles (preschools): Achille Peretti, Charcot, Dulud, Gorce-Franklin, Michelis, Poissoniers, Roule, Saussaye
- Ten elementary schools: Charcot A, Charcot B, Gorce-Franklin, Huissiers, Poissoniers, Peretti, Michelis A, Michelis B, Saussaye A, and Saussaye B
- Two lower secondary schools: Collège André Maurois and Collège Théophile Gautier.
- Collège et Lycée Pasteur
- Lycée Saint-James
- Lycée professionnel Vassily Kandinsky

Domestic private schools:

- École primaire Sainte-Croix
- École primaire Sainte-Marie
- École primaire Saint-Dominique
- École Saint-Pierre / Saint Jean
- Collège Saint-Pierre / Saint-Jean
- Collège et Lycée Sainte-Croix
- Collège et Lycée Sainte-Marie
- Collège et Lycée Saint-Dominique
- Lycée professionnel Georges Guérin

International private schools:

- Liceo Español Luis Buñuel, Spanish international secondary and baccalaureate school
- Marymount School, Paris, a Catholic, co-educational, day school for 2-14 year olds

Post-secondary:

- Université de Paris IV-Sorbonne CELSA
- Institut Européen des Affaires
- École supérieure de Santé

== Notable residents ==
- Adrien Étienne Gaudez (1845–1902), French sculptor
- Ahmad Shah Qajar (1898–1930), the last shah of Iran's Qajar dynasty
- Alex Goude (born 1975), actor and television host
- Albert de Bailliencourt (1908-1994), politician
- Pierre Cardin (1922–2020), fashion designer; He is known for what were his avant-garde style and Space Age designs; also know neckties and handkerchief maker
- Albert Uderzo (1927–2020), co-creator, writer and illustrator of Asterix
- Alexander Glazunov (1865–1936), Russian composer
- Anaïs Nin (1903–1977), author and diarist, born in Neuilly-sur-Seine
- Anatole Litvak (1902–1974), Ukrainian filmmaker
- André Beaufre (1902–1975), general
- Annie Fargé (1934–2011), actress, theatrical producer and manager. Died here.
- Anthony Beltoise, racing driver
- Aristotle Onassis died on 15 March 1975 at the American Hospital
- Arthur Zagre, footballer
- Bernard Blossac, fashion illustrator
- Bette Davis, non-resident, died at the American Hospital
- Carole Bouquet, actress
- Cecile Paul Simon, composer
- Charles Frédéric Girard (1822–1895), ichthyologist and herpetologist, died in Neuilly
- Christoph H. Müller musician, composer, co-founder of Neotango band Gotan Project
- Claude Brasseur actor and rally driver
- Corentin Moutet, tennis player
- David Servan-Schreiber (1961–2011)
- Diane Leyre, French model and Miss France 2022
- Dominique Strauss-Kahn (born 25 April 1949)
- Eça de Queirós, Portuguese writer
- Édith Piaf, French singer
- Edward, Duke of Windsor, formerly Edward VIII, King of the United Kingdom and the Dominions of the British Empire, and Emperor of India.
- France Gall, French singer
- Francoise Gilot, Painter, Picasso's lover 1943-1953, mother of two of his children.
- François Hesnault, racing driver
- François Truffaut, French film director, actor
- Françoise Bettencourt Meyers, Liliane Bettencourt's daughter
- Giuliano da Empoli (born 1973), political essayist and novelist.
- Gisèle Sapiro (born 1965), sociologist and historian
- Guy-Manuel de Homem-Christo, half of music duo Daft Punk
- Ilona Mitrecey, Eurodance artist
- Jacqueline François (1922–2009), chanson singer
- Jacques Benoit, scientist
- Jacques Prévert, poet and screenwriter
- Jacques Zwobada, French sculptor
- Jean-Christophe Victor, geographer
- Jean d'Ormesson, French novelist member of the Académie française
- Jean de La Fontaine, French poet and fabulist
- Jean de Pourtales, racing driver
- Jean-Marie Clairet, racing driver
- Jean-Paul Belmondo, French actor
- Jean Raspail, French writer
- Jean Rollin (1932–2010), French filmmaker
- Jean Riboud (1919–1985) French corporate executive and former chairman of Schlumberger
- Joachim Murat, Prince of Pontecorvo, aristocrat
- Jonathan Bru, footballer
- Joseph Haïm Sitruk (1944-2016), former Chief Rabbi of France.
- Karl Lagerfeld, German fashion designer
- Liliane Bettencourt, L'Oréal heiress
- Lou Doillon, French-British singer and actress, born in Neuilly-sur-Seine.
- Ludovic Valbon, rugby player
- Marcel Duchamp, artist
- María Félix, Mexican actress
- Marie Angliviel de la Beaumelle, French glass maker and Italian countess
- Marine Le Pen, French politician and president of the Rassemblement National
- Martin Solveig, French electro-house DJ
- Mary Wollstonecraft, English writer
- Max Le Verrier (1891–1973), sculptor, born here.
- Prince Michel of Bourbon-Parma, died here
- Michel Berger, singer and songwriter
- Mike Sparken, racing driver
- Mireille Mathieu, chanson singer, has been a resident since 1965
- Natalie Barney, American heiress
- King Nicholas I of Montenegro and his family
- Nicolas Sarkozy, former President of France; mayor of Neuilly-sur-Seine from 1983 to 2002
- Olivier Missoup, rugby player
- Paul Grimault, animator
- Pierre Ramond, string theorist
- Quincy Jones, musician, composer, producer
- Ramón Emeterio Betances (1827–1898), Puerto Rican independence advocate, lived and died here
- René Semelaigne (1855–1934), biographer
- Roger Martin du Gard, winner of the 1937 Nobel Prize for Literature
- Sandra Boëlle, politician
- Screamin' Jay Hawkins, Shock rock musician
- Sophie Marceau, French actress
- Thierry Sabine, founder of the Dakar Rally
- Véronique Azan, French dancer
- Vincent Courtillot, geophysicist born in Neuilly in 1948
- Vittorio De Sica, Italian actor and film director
- Wallis Simpson, American socialite and wife of Edward, Duke of Windsor, formerly King Edward VIII.
- Wassily Kandinsky, Russian Abstract-Expressionist artist
- G. Toengi, actress, vj
- Zizi Lambrino, first wife of the later King Carol II of Romania

== Twin towns – sister cities ==
Neuilly-sur-Seine is twinned with:

- Hanau, Germany (1964–2002)
- Uccle, Belgium (from 1981)
- Windsor, England, United Kingdom (from 1955)

== See also ==
- Communes of the Hauts-de-Seine department
- Neuilly-Auteuil-Passy
- Neuilly sa mère!, 2009 film set in Neuilly-sur-Seine
