= Avenue Charles-de-Gaulle (Neuilly-sur-Seine) =

Coordinates: 48.8831°N 2.2656°E

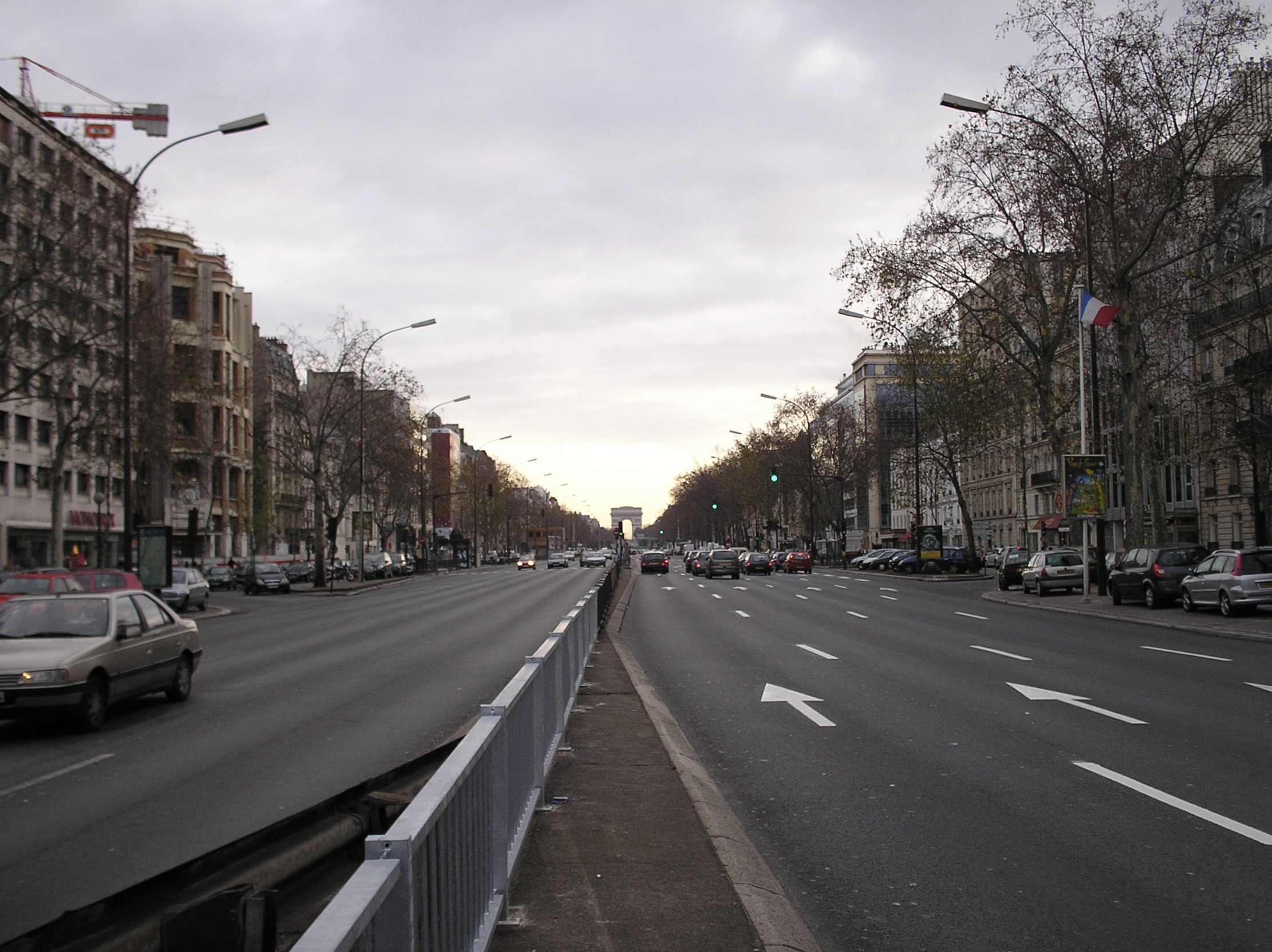
Avenue Charles-de-Gaulle with the Arc de Triomphe in the distance

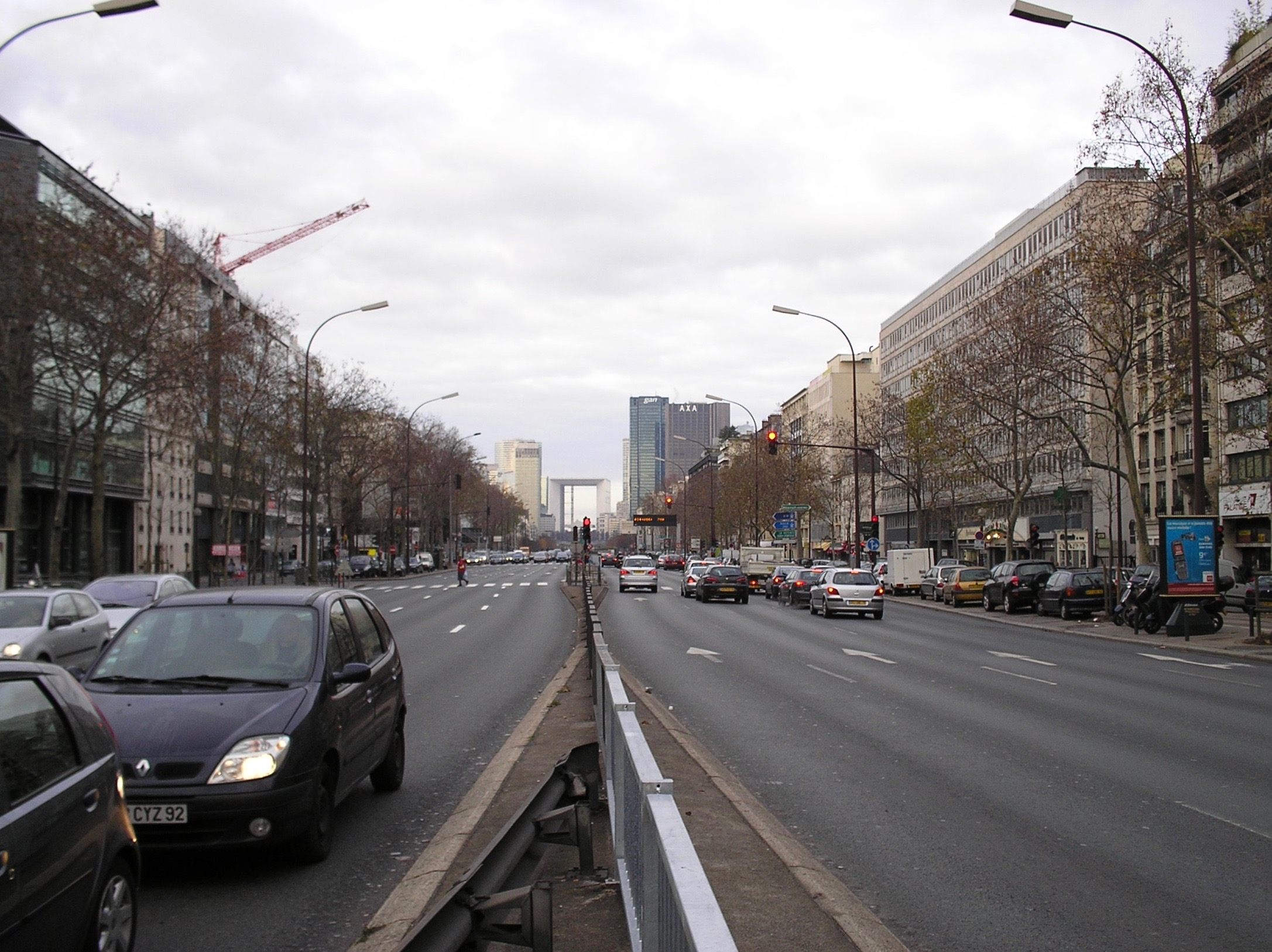
Avenue Charles-de-Gaulle with La Défense in the distance

The Avenue Charles-de-Gaulle (French pronunciation: [avny ʃaʁl də ɡol]) is an avenue in Neuilly-sur-Seine, Paris, France, named after Charles de Gaulle.

The avenue forms part of the Route nationale 13. Until 1971, it was called the Avenue de Neuilly, a rare case in France where the road bears the name of the commune in which it is found. The Avenue Charles-de-Gaulle continues along Paris's Axe historique, which stretches from the original Palais des Tuileries to the Porte Maillot, and which finishes at the Pont de Neuilly. It forms a segment of the axe majeur, which links Paris and La Défense. It is used by a daily flow of 160,000 vehicles.

Since 1992, part of the avenue passed underground for 440 metres (1,440 ft), at the exit of Neuilly-sur-Seine. This was due to the completion of the couverture Madrid.
