= Hôtel de Ville, Neuilly-sur-Seine =

Town hall in Neuilly-sur-Seine, France

Hôtel de Ville
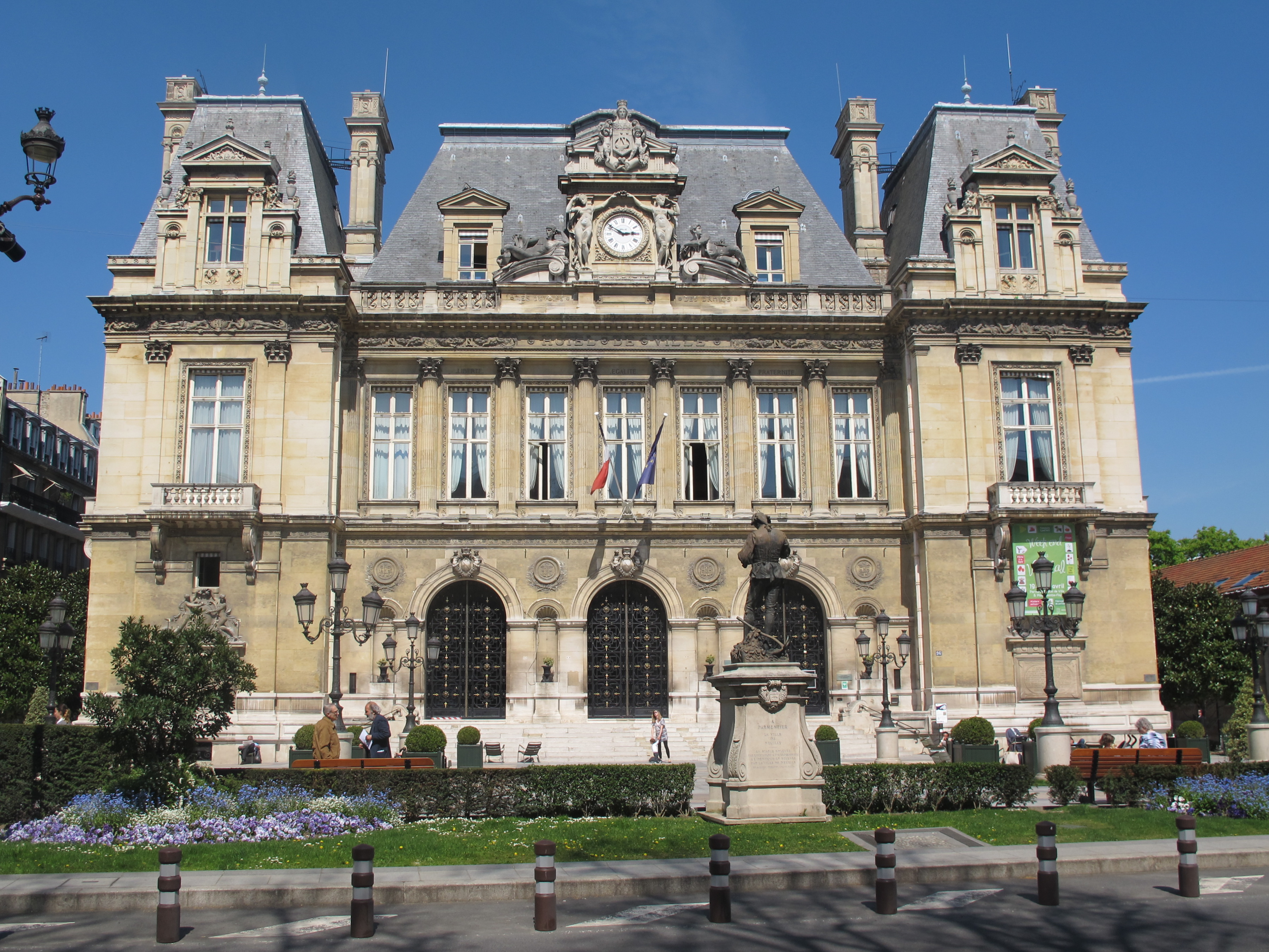
- The main frontage of the Hôtel de Ville in April 2013
- Interactive map of the Hôtel de Ville area

General information
- Type: City hall
- Architectural style: Renaissance Revival style
- Location: Neuilly-sur-Seine, France
- Coordinates: 48.8848°N 2.2697°E
- Completed: 1886

Design and construction
- Architects: Victor Dutocq and Charles Simonet

The Hôtel de Ville (French pronunciation: [otɛl də vil], City Hall) is a municipal building in Neuilly-sur-Seine, Hauts-de-Seine in the northwestern suburbs of Paris, France, standing on Avenue Achille Peretti. It has been included on the Inventaire général des monuments by the French Ministry of Culture since 1992.

== History ==
Following the French Revolution, the town council led by the mayor, Nicolas Delaizement, initially met at a room adjoining the Church of Saint John the Baptist on what is now Avenue Charles-de-Gaulle, before relocating to a house on Rue de Madrid (now Rue du Château) in 1809. In the early 1830s, the council decided to commission a dedicated town hall and selected a site on Place Parmentier. The building was designed by Pierre Marie Marcel in the neoclassical style, built in ashlar stone and was completed in June 1836. In the early 1880s, the council decided to commission a more substantial town hall. The site they selected this time was a property belonging to Élodie Balsan, who was a member of the wealthy Balson family, on Avenue du Roule (now Avenue Achille Peretti).

The foundation stone for the new building was laid on 2 June 1882. It was designed by Victor Dutocq and Charles Simonet in the Renaissance Revival style, built in ashlar stone and was officially opened by the prefect of the Seine, Eugène Poubelle, on 16 January 1886.

The design involved a symmetrical main frontage of nine bays facing onto Avenue du Roule, with the end bays projected forward as pavilions. The central section of seven bays featured three round-headed openings with imposts, moulded surrounds and iron grills. There were seven tall casement windows on the first floor, each flanked by Composite order columns supporting a frieze, a modillioned cornice and a parapet. Above the central three bays, there was clock which was supported by caryatids and reclining male figures and surmounted by a coat of arms. The end bays contained panels surmounted by carvings on the ground floor, casement windows with balconies on the first floor and dormer windows at attic level. Internally, the principal rooms were the Salle du Conseil (council chamber) and the Salle des Mariages (wedding room).

On 27 November 1919, following the First World War, the town hall was the venue for the signing of the Treaty of Neuilly-sur-Seine. The treaty, which was signed by Bulgarian King, Boris III, and Bulgarian Prime Minister, Aleksandar Stamboliyski, required Bulgaria to cede certain territories to the allied powers. The artist, Gustave Louis Jaulmes, painted a fine mural for the ante-room to the Salle du Mariages (wedding room) in 1939.

During the Paris insurrection on 19 August 1944, part of the Second World War, a German tank climbed the steps and entered the town hall to recover several German troops who had been arrested and were being held by the French Resistance. The German Army eventually regained control but 11 members of the French Resistance were killed in the fighting. This was just a week before the liberation of the town by the French 2nd Armoured Division, commanded by General Philippe Leclerc, on 25 August 1944.

Activists opposed to Algerian independence, acting on behalf of the Organisation armée secrète, detonated a plastic bomb in a telephone booth on the ground floor of the town hall on the afternoon of 24 April 1961. Nobody was hurt.

A statue of the agronomist, Antoine-Augustin Parmentier, was relocated from the square in front of the town hall to Place Parmentier in October 2023. It was replaced by a statue of the engineer, Jean-Rodolphe Perronet.
