= Pont de Neuilly =

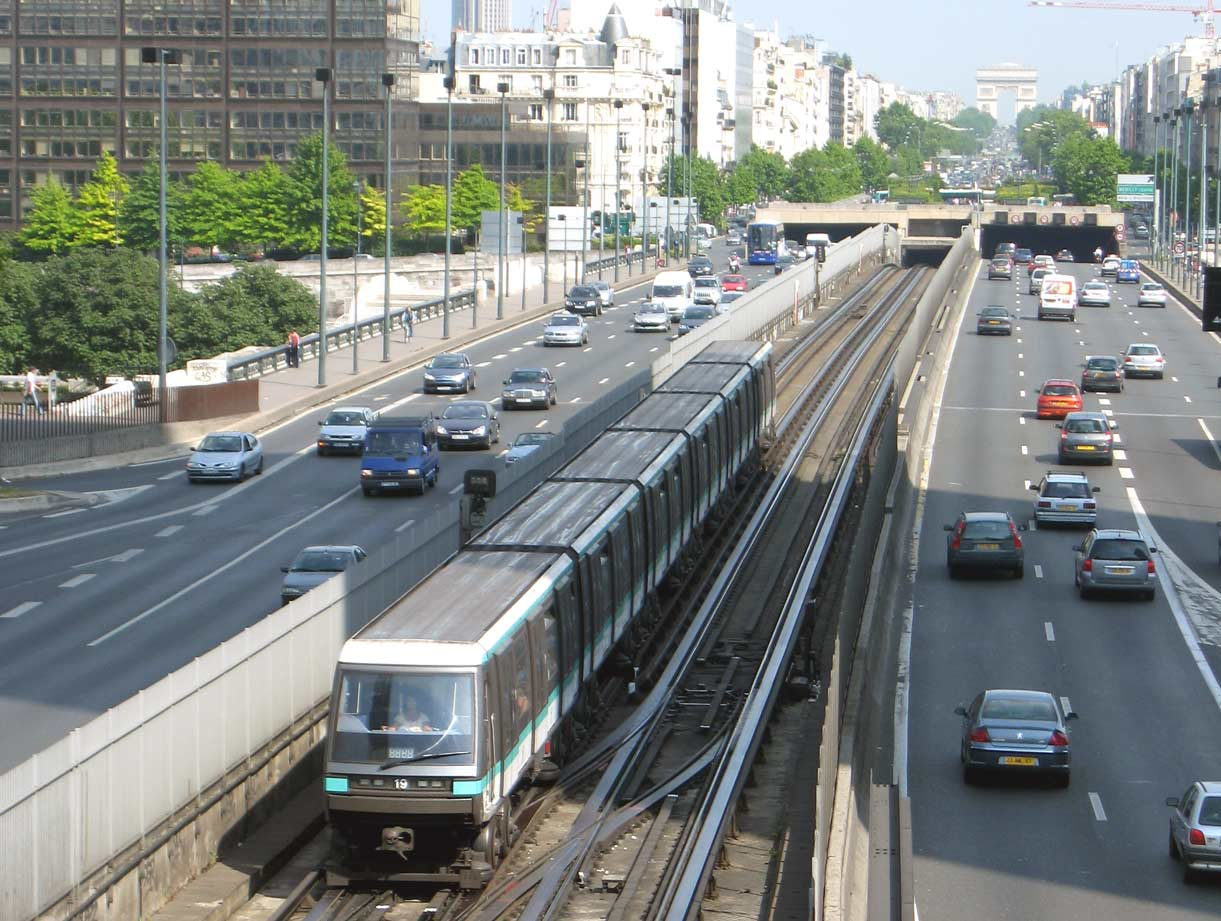
- The Pont de Neuilly, extending Paris's Axe historique westbound to La Défense
- Coordinates: 48°53′12″N 2°15′17″E
- Crosses: Seine
- Locale: Neuilly-sur-Seine, Courbevoie and Puteaux, France
- Next upstream: Pont de Puteaux
- Next downstream: Pont Bineau and Pont de Courbevoie (across the Île de la Jatte)

Characteristics
- Total length: 257 metres (843 ft) (5 spans of 39 metres (128 ft))
- Width: 43 metres (141 ft)

Location
- Interactive map of Pont de Neuilly

The Pont de Neuilly (English: Bridge of Neuilly) is a road and rail bridge carrying the Route nationale 13 (N13) and Paris Métro Line 1 which crosses the Seine between the right bank of Neuilly-sur-Seine and Courbevoie and Puteaux on the left bank in the department of Hauts-de-Seine. It faces the headquarters of La Défense and is aligned on the Axe historique of Paris.

== History ==
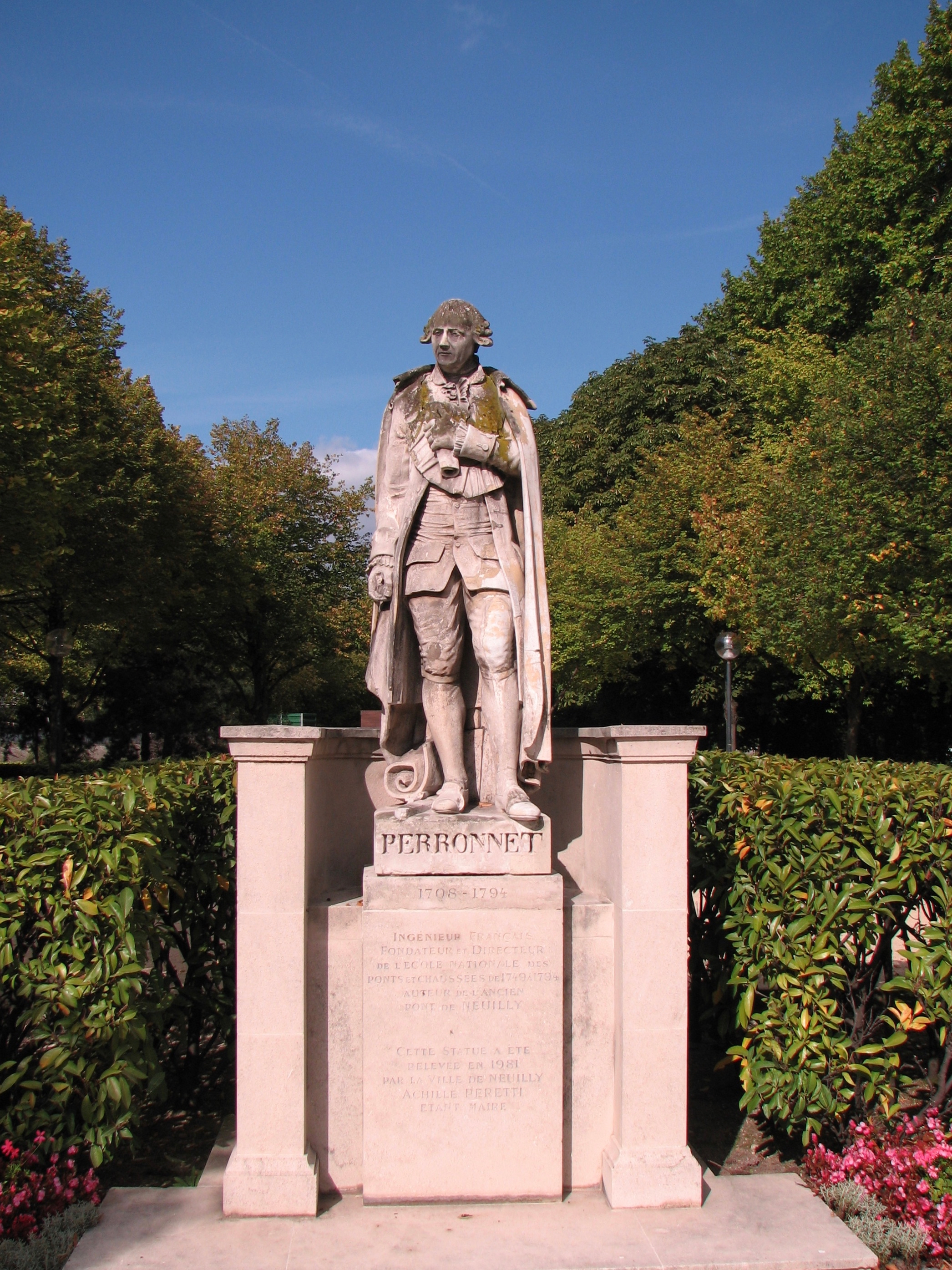
Statue of Jean-Rodolphe Perronet

=== Before the bridges ===
At this point of the Seine, there was a ford which extended an old Roman road linking Montmartre to Mont Valérien. In 1140, Abbot Suger created a ferry there, contributing to the development of a fishing village and a small port, the origin of Neuilly (Port Nully), and the route to Normandy.

=== Le pont Henri ===
The first bridge on the site was in wood, built after the fall of Henry IV and Marie de Médicis's carriage on 6 June 1606. Around 5 p.m., a rainy day, the carriage of Henri IV and Marie de' Medici, dragged by the fall of two of the horses, fell from the ferry crossing the Seine in Neuilly on the way back from the castle of Saint-Germain-en-Laye. The queen and the three royal children, who are all under four years old, were brought up from the bottom of the water by the king himself and the men of his retinue. As a result, Henri IV had the first wooden bridge of sixteen arches built at the axis of the current rue du Pont, the Pont Henri. To cross it, you have to pay a toll. In 1638, a flood destroyed the bridge, which was then rebuilt with fourteen arches.

=== Stone bridge ===
The second was a 219m-long five-arched structure built in 1774 by Jean-Rodolphe Perronet, founder of the École des ponts et chaussées (a stone statue of him is now at the foot of the bridge, at the west point of the Île de Puteaux). It was built as an extension of the Avenue de Neuilly (a historic axis, therefore a little further south than the old bridge) and inaugurated on 22 September 1772 in the presence of King Louis XV, who crossed it. The finishing touches lasted until 1780, when the wooden bridge was destroyed. Between 1935 and 1942, this bridge, which had become unsuitable for the increase in traffic, was gradually rebuilt. The architect Bigot directed the work.

=== New metal bridge ===
The second bridge was demolished between 1936 and 1942 and replaced in 1942 with a metal bridge by Louis-Alexandre Lévy and the Daydé company. It was welded metal arches and rested on ashlar masonry abutments. Its width was 35 metres, compared to 13 metres for the stone bridge. In 1992, its pedestrian sidewalks were narrowed to allow Line 1 to be added to the bridge and the bridge gave its name to the nearby Métro station.

The present bridge effectively consisted of two bridges. A 67-metre span between Neuilly-sur-Seine and the Île de Puteaux, as well as an 87-metre span between the Île de Puteaux and Courbevoie. A pedestrian staircase in the middle of the bridge allows access to the Île de Puteaux.
