= Pont de Neuilly station =

Paris Métro station in Neuilly-sur-Seine

Pont de Neuilly
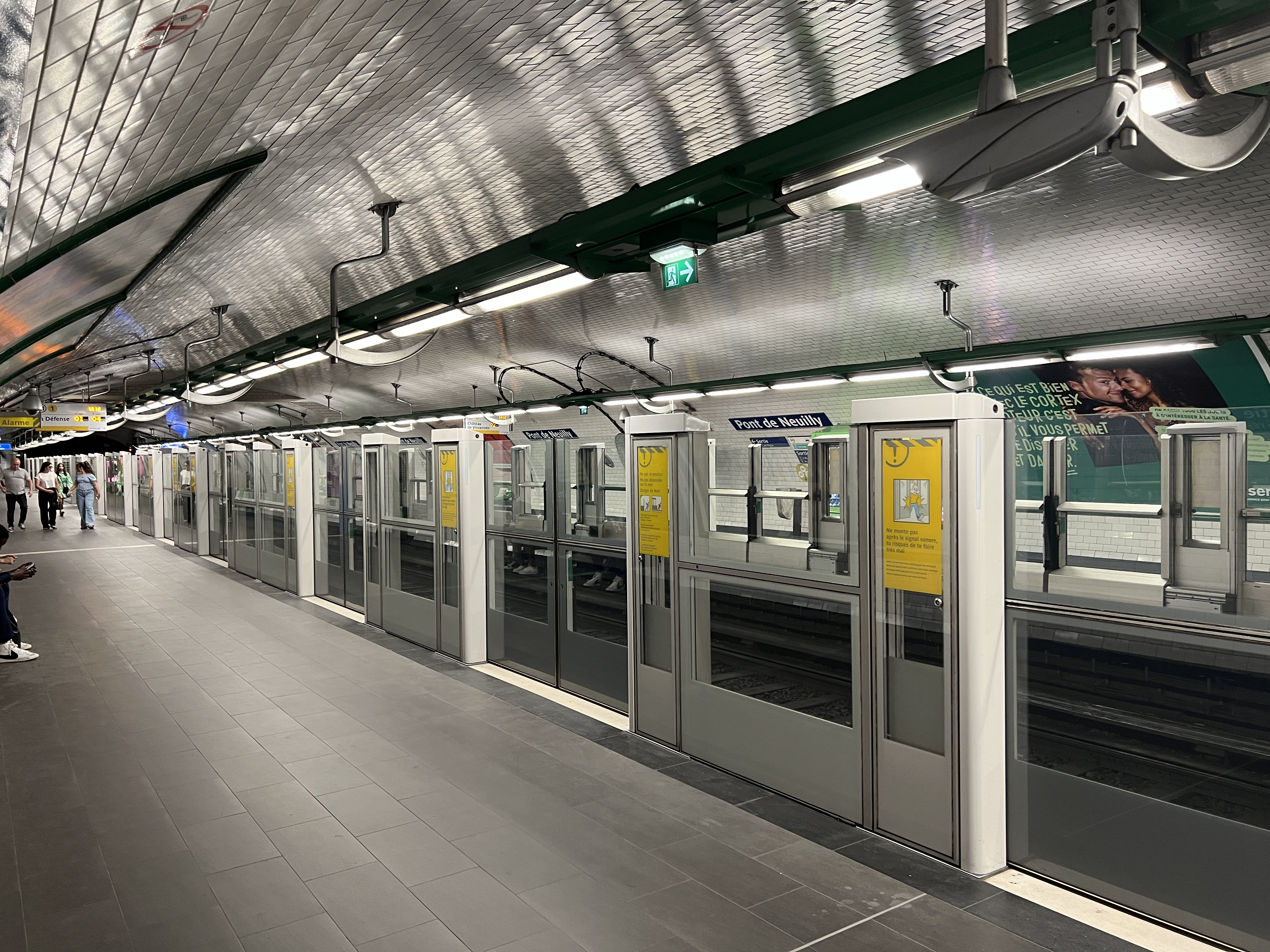
- The platforms

General information
- Location: 185, av. Charles de Gaulle; 205, av. Charles de Gaulle; 209, av. Charles de Gaulle; Neuilly-sur-Seine; Île-de-France; France
- Coordinates: 48°53′06″N 2°15′35″E
- Owner: RATP
- Operator: RATP

Other information
- Fare zone: 2

History
- Opened: 29 April 1937; 89 years ago

Services
Preceding station	Paris Metro	Following station
Esplanade de La Défense towards La Défense	Line 1	Les Sablons towards Château de Vincennes
Route map
Location
- Location within Paris

Pont de Neuilly (French pronunciation: [pɔ̃ d(ə) nœji]) is a station on Line 1 of the Paris Métro, situated in the prosperous suburban commune of Neuilly-sur-Seine. Between 1940 and 1950 it was known as Pont de Neuilly, Avenue de Madrid.

== Location ==
The station is located under Avenue Charles-de-Gaulle (RN 13) at its intersection with Avenue de Madrid. Oriented approximately along a north-west/south-east axis, it is situated between the Esplanade de la Défense and Les Sablons metro stations, separated from the former by an above-ground crossing of the Seine river in the centre of the Pont de Neuilly bridge, with a grade of 6%, the steepest in the network. In the direction of La Défense, it is the last classic station available on this part of the line.

It is named after the Pont de Neuilly, a nearby bridge. The bridge - which carries parallel road and rail links between Neuilly and La Défense, over the river Seine - is in fact nearer to the Esplanade de la Défense metro station than to the Pont de Neuilly metro station.

It was the western terminus of Line 1 from 1937 until 1992, before the western extension to La Défense metro was opened. Above the station lies an esplanade from which one can see the area of La Défense.

== History ==
The station was opened on 29 April 1937 as the western terminus of line 1 from Château de Vincennes, replacing the original terminus at Porte Maillot. It owes its name to its relative proximity to the Neuilly bridge, linking Neuilly-sur-Seine on the right bank of the Seine to the communes of Courbevoie and Puteaux on the left bank, in line with the historic Parisian axis. The station was named Pont de Neuilly - Avenue de Madrid from 1940 to 1950 to highlight its location at the intersection of the Avenue de Madrid, which takes its name from the capital of Spain.

The station was modernized after 1988 by the adoption of the decorative style Ouï-dire on the platforms, green in this case.

On 1 April 1992, it became a transit station with the inauguration of the extension to Grande Arche de la Défense (now La Défense). This extension required the complete takeover of the rear station in order to allow the passage of the line on the Pont d Neuillyy, the basement constrained at that time by the presence of the tunnel of RER A line, built during the 1960s.

As part of the automation of line 1, the platforms were raised to accommodate platform screen doors, installed between mid-June and mid-July 2009, making this station the second on the line to benefit from these doors after Bérault.

In 2019, according to RATP estimates, 6,902,027 passengers entered this station, which places it in the 41st position of metro stations for its usage out of 302. In the same year, the docks lost their asphalt pavement to dark tiles.

In 2020, with the Covid-19 crisis, 3,678,074 passengers entered this station, which places it in the 36th position of metro stations for its usage.

In 2021, attendance gradually increases, with 4,822,599 passengers entering this station which places it in the 41st position of metro stations for its usage.

== Passenger services ==
=== Access ===
The station has three entrances divided into six metro accesses, established on the side medians of Avenue Charles-de-Gaulle:

- 1 - Rue du Château: two fixed stairs, one decorated with a mast with a yellow "M" inscribed in a circle, leading to no. 168 of the avenue;
- 2 - Avenue de Madrid: a fixed staircase to the right of no. 205 Avenue Charles-de-Gaulle and an escalator facing nos. 203 and 203 bis;
- 3 - Rue de l'Église: a fixed staircase with a yellow totem "M" leading to the right of no. 185 Avenue Charles-de-Gaulle and an escalator going up to the Église Saint-Jean-Baptiste de Neuilly-sur-Seine at no. 158.

Each stair hopper has the particularity of being treated in flat brown tiles laid vertically and aligned.

=== Station layout ===
Street Level

B1	Mezzanine for platform connection

B2; Platforms	Side platform with PSDs, doors will open on the right
B2; Platforms	Westbound	← toward La Défense – Grande Arche (Esplanade de La Défense)
B2; Platforms	Eastbound	toward Château de Vincennes (Les Sablons)→
B2; Platforms	Side platform with PSDs, doors will open on the right

=== Platforms ===
Pont de Neuilly is a standard configuration station. It has two platforms, 105 meters long, separated by the metro tracks and the vault is elliptical. The decoration is in the Ouï-dire green style. The lighting canopies, of the same colour, are supported by curved braces in the shape of a scythe. The direct lighting is white as well as, unlike most light canopies of this style, indirect lighting. The white ceramic tiles are flat and cover the walls, vault, tunnel exits and outlets of the corridors. The advertising frames are green and cylindrical and the name of the station is inscribed in Parisine font on enamelled plates. The platforms are tiled in anthracite grey and equipped with green Motte style shell seats as well platform screen doors.

=== Bus connections ===
The station is served by bus lines 43, 73, 93, 157, 158, 174 and 176 of the RATP Bus Network and by lines N11, N24 and N153 of the Noctilien night bus service.

Some of these lines terminate at the bus station overlooking the station; this space is extended to the northwest by an esplanade from which emerges a view of the business district of La Défense.

== Nearby ==
- Église Saint-Jean-Baptiste de Neuilly-sur-Seine

== Gallery ==
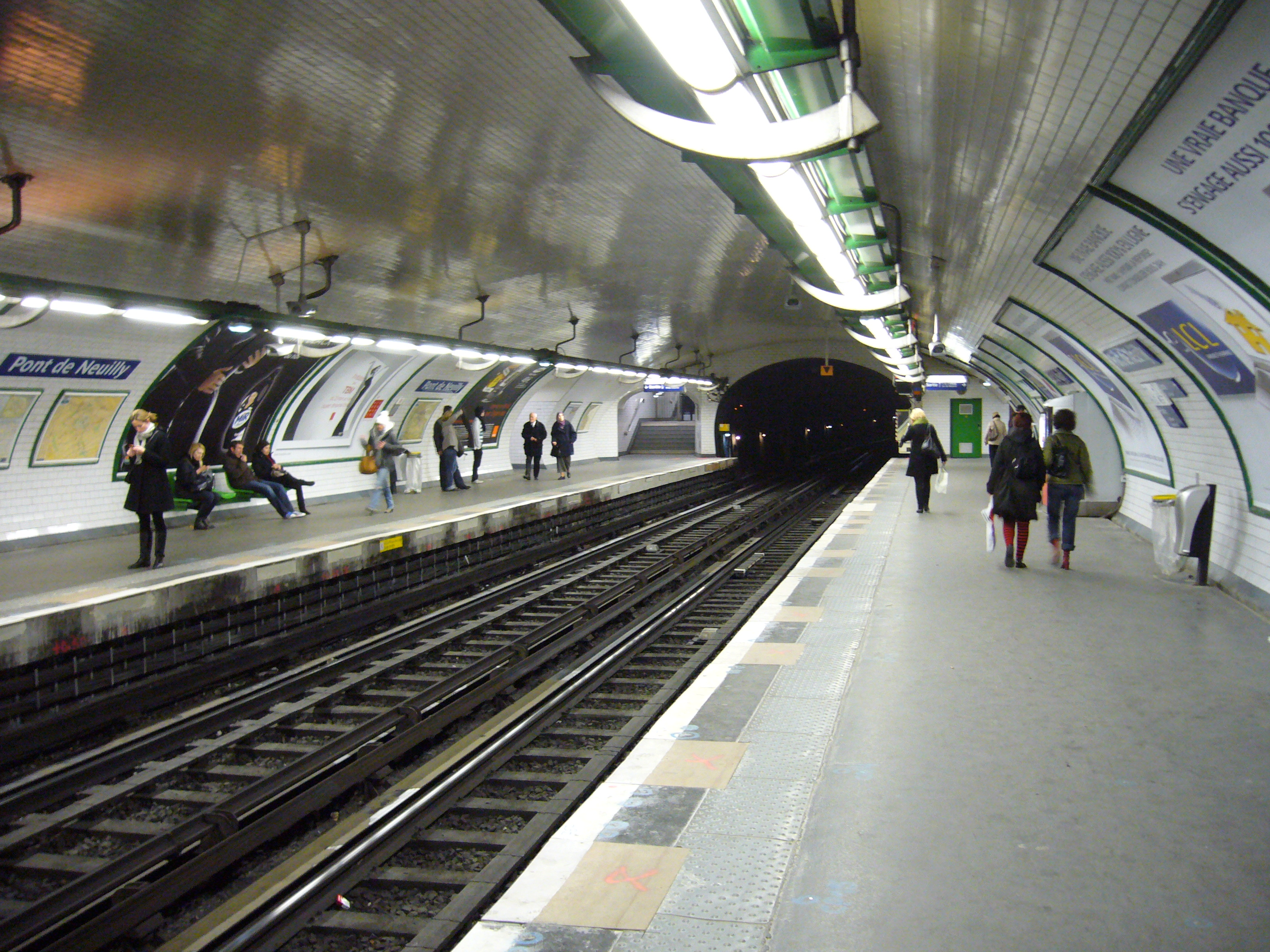
Eastbound view

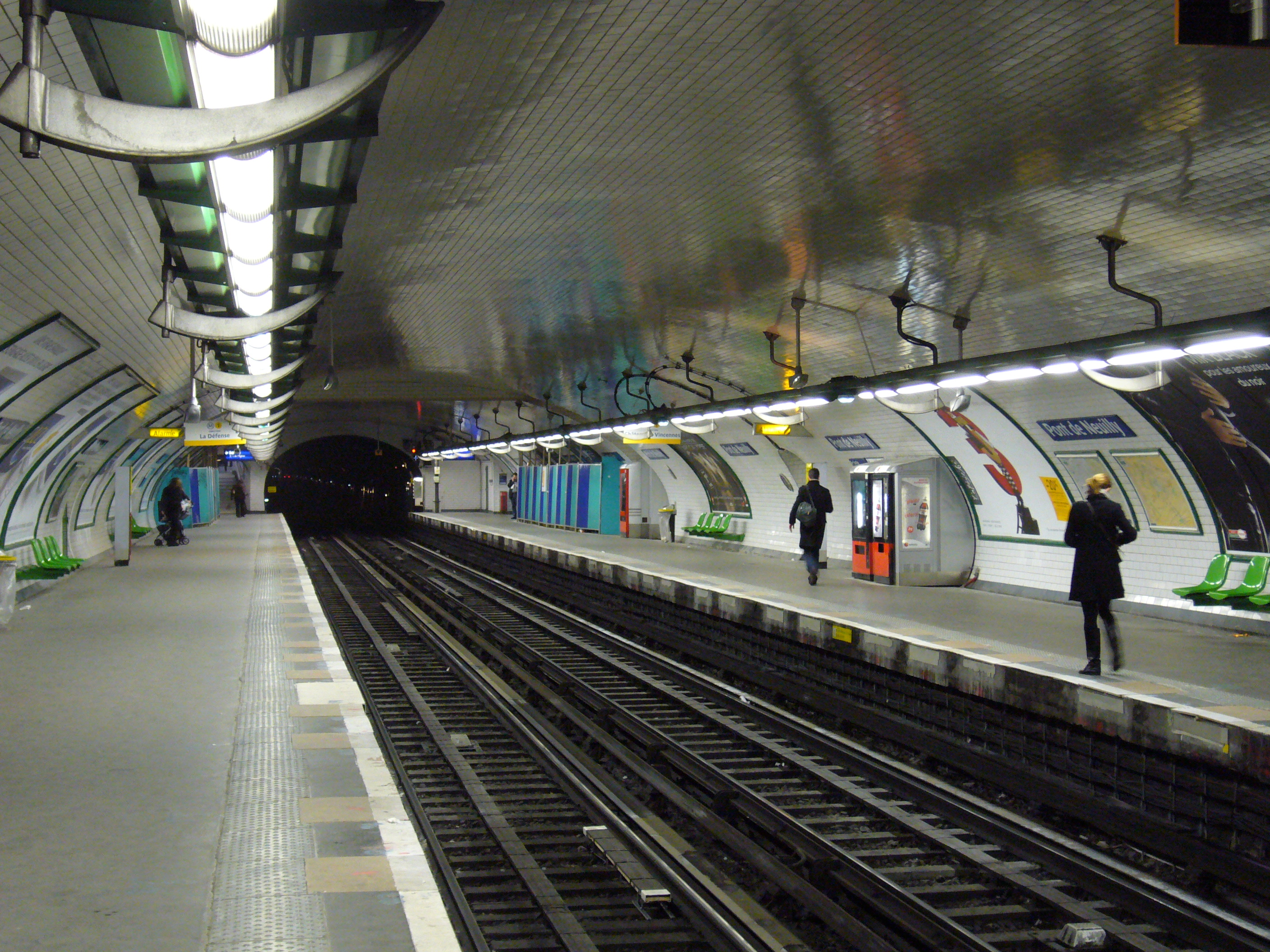
Westbound view

MP 89 rolling stock arriving at Pont de Neuilly
