= Porte Maillot station =

Metro station in Paris, France

Porte Maillot Palais des Congrès
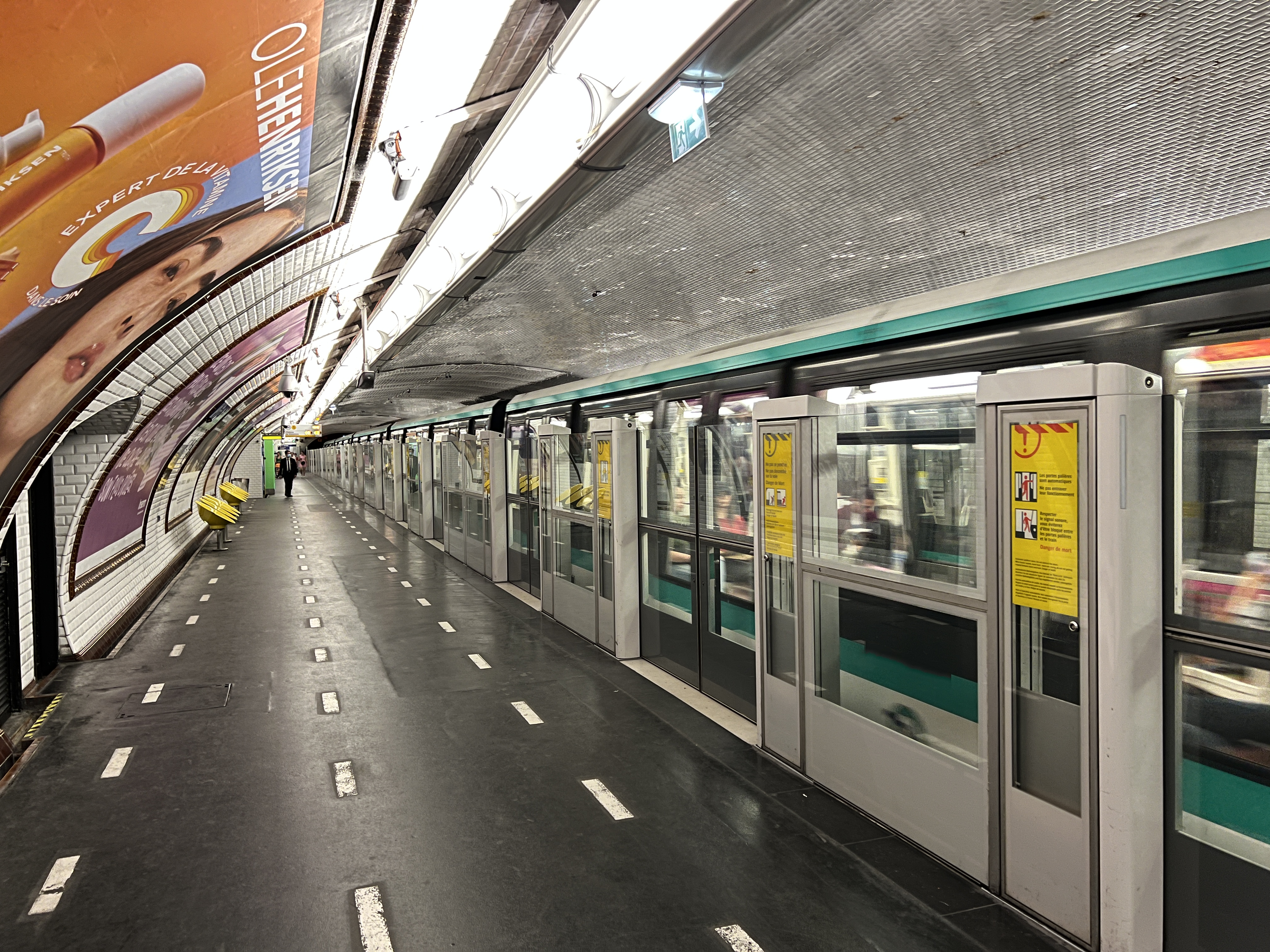
- Line 1 platforms

General information
- Location: 23/27, av. Charles de Gaulle; 80, av. de la Grande Armée; 87, av. de la Grande Armée; Place Maillot; 16, place de Verdun; 16th arrondissement of Paris; Île-de-France; France
- Coordinates: 48°52′41″N 2°16′55″E
- Owner: RATP
- Operator: RATP
- Line: Paris Metro Paris Metro Line 1
- Platforms: 4
- Tracks: 4
- Connections: Tramways in Île-de-France Île-de-France tramway Line 3b

Construction
- Accessible: no

Other information
- Fare zone: 1

History
- Opened: 19 July 1900; 126 years ago

Services
Preceding station	Paris Metro	Following station
Les Sablons towards La Défense	Line 1	Argentine towards Château de Vincennes
Connections to other stations
Preceding station	RER	Following station
Pereire–Levallois towards Pontoise	RER C transfer at Neuilly–Porte Maillot	Avenue Foch towards Massy-Palaiseau or Dourdan-la-Forêt
La Défense towards Nanterre–La Folie	RER E transfer at Neuilly–Porte Maillot	Haussmann–Saint-Lazare towards Chelles–Gournay or Tournan
Route map
Location
- Location within Paris

Porte Maillot (French pronunciation: [pɔʁt majo]; lit. 'Maillot Gate') is a station on Line 1 of the Paris Métro. It is connected to the Neuilly–Porte Maillot railway station on the RER C and RER E, as well as a stop of tramway Line T3b. The station in its current form opened in 1937, replacing the original Porte Maillot station that opened in 1900 as the original terminus of Line 1. It serves the Palais des Congrès and has exits towards Neuilly-sur-Seine. It is located close to the Bois de Boulogne.

== History ==
The first station called "Porte Maillot" opened in 1900 and was the terminus of Line 1, and was therefore a loop, allowing trains to turn around without reversing. Like Porte Dauphine and Porte de Vincennes, it was arranged with a central waiting area and tracks on either side, with two tunnels.

When Line 1 was extended to the west to Pont de Neuilly in 1937, the station needed to be replaced as it was at the same depth as the tunnels of the railway line today served by the RER C. Thus, the tunnel of the Line 1 extension descends and passes under the old loop, and then reaches the new station at a distance of approximately 100 meters from the old station. The platforms of the new station were built 105 metres long to accommodate 7-car trains in the future, a plan which has never been realised.

In 1992, the old station was turned into a reception area by the RATP called the "Espace Maillot". It was again transformed in 1997 into a maintenance facility for the new MP 05 rolling stock.

In 1988, the RER C started serving the Neuilly – Porte Maillot station of the RER C. In 2024, an extension of RER E from Haussmann–Saint-Lazare to La Défense opened with a new underground station at Neuilly – Porte Maillot. The metro station is connected to the RER E station via an underground corridor, from where the RER C station can be reached via another corridor.

== Passenger services ==
=== Access ===
- Access 1 - Palais des Congrès
- Access 2 - Boulevard Gouvion-Saint-Cyr
- Access 3 - Place de la Porte-Maillot
- Access 4 - Avenue de la Grande-Armée
- Access 5 - Avenue de Malakoff
- Access 6 - Avenue Charles-de-Gaulle
- Access 7 - Rue de Chartres

=== Station layout ===
Street Level

B1	Mezzanine for platform connection

B2; Platforms	Side platform with PSDs, doors will open on the right
B2; Platforms	Westbound	← toward La Défense – Grande Arche (Les Sablons)
B2; Platforms	Westbound siding	← toward La Défense – Grande Arche (No regular service)
B2; Platforms	Side platform with PSDs, no regular service
B2; Platforms	Side platform with PSDs, no regular service
B2; Platforms	Eastbound siding	→ toward Château de Vincennes (No regular service)
B2; Platforms	Eastbound	→ toward Château de Vincennes (Argentine)
B2; Platforms	Side platform with PSDs, doors will open on the right

=== Platforms ===
The current station is made up of two parallel stations, each of standard configuration with two platforms separated by the metro tracks under an elliptical arch. The trains run on the outer tracks, the others being used as termini or garages. The decoration is in the style used for the majority of metro stations. The lighting canopies are white and rounded in the Gaudin style of the metro revival of the 2000s (with the exception of one on the south platform of the north station), and the bevelled white ceramic tiles cover the walls, the vault, and the tunnel exits. The advertising frames are made of brown ceramic and the name of the station is inscribed in the metro's font, Parisine, on enamelled plaques. The platforms are equipped with yellow Akiko seats, and are fully equipped with screen doors, as is the north platform of the south station (the fourth platform, bordered by a dead-end track on the east side, has façade modules only at the ends, on the spaces not covered by the trains that are parked there).

=== Other connections ===
The station is served by bus lines 73, 82, PC, 244 and 274 (remotely, from the Porte des Ternes stop) of the RATP Bus Network and by lines N11, N24, N151 and N153 of the Noctilien night bus service as well as tram T3b. In addition, it is at the origin of a bus link to Beauvais-Tillé Airport.

== Gallery ==
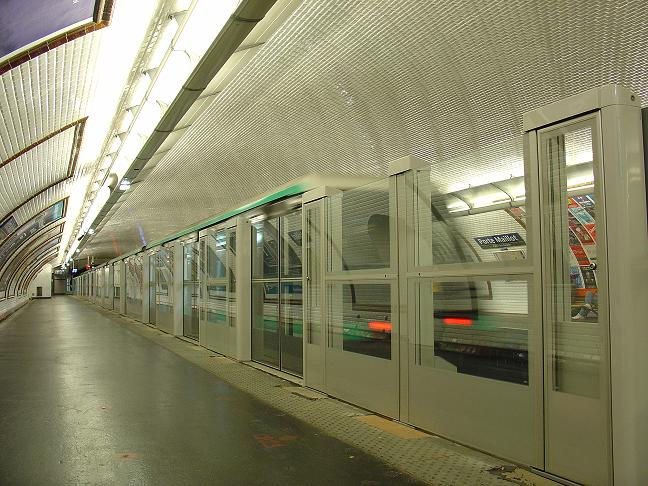
Automatic platform gates at Porte Maillot

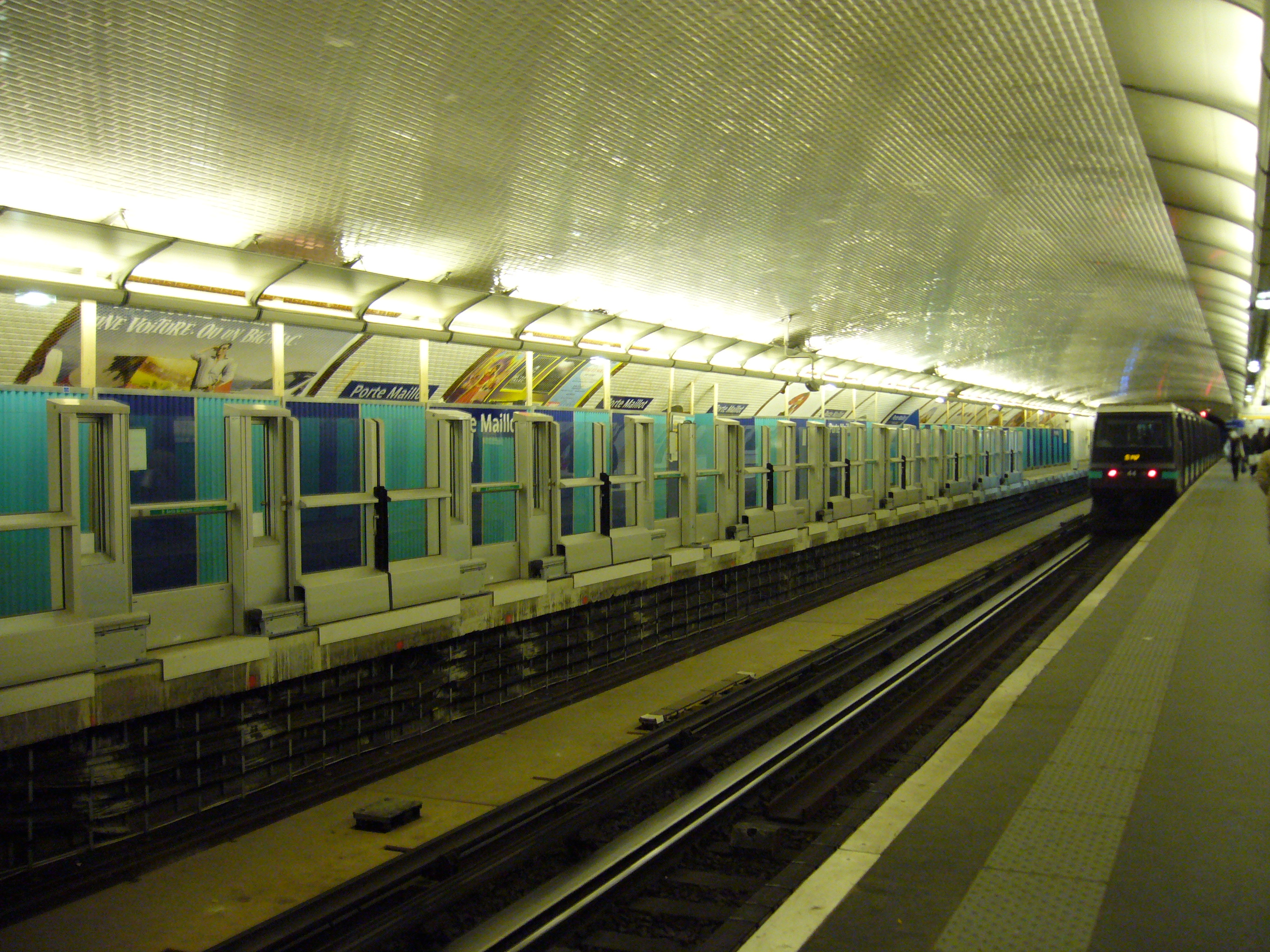
Installation of gates in November 2008

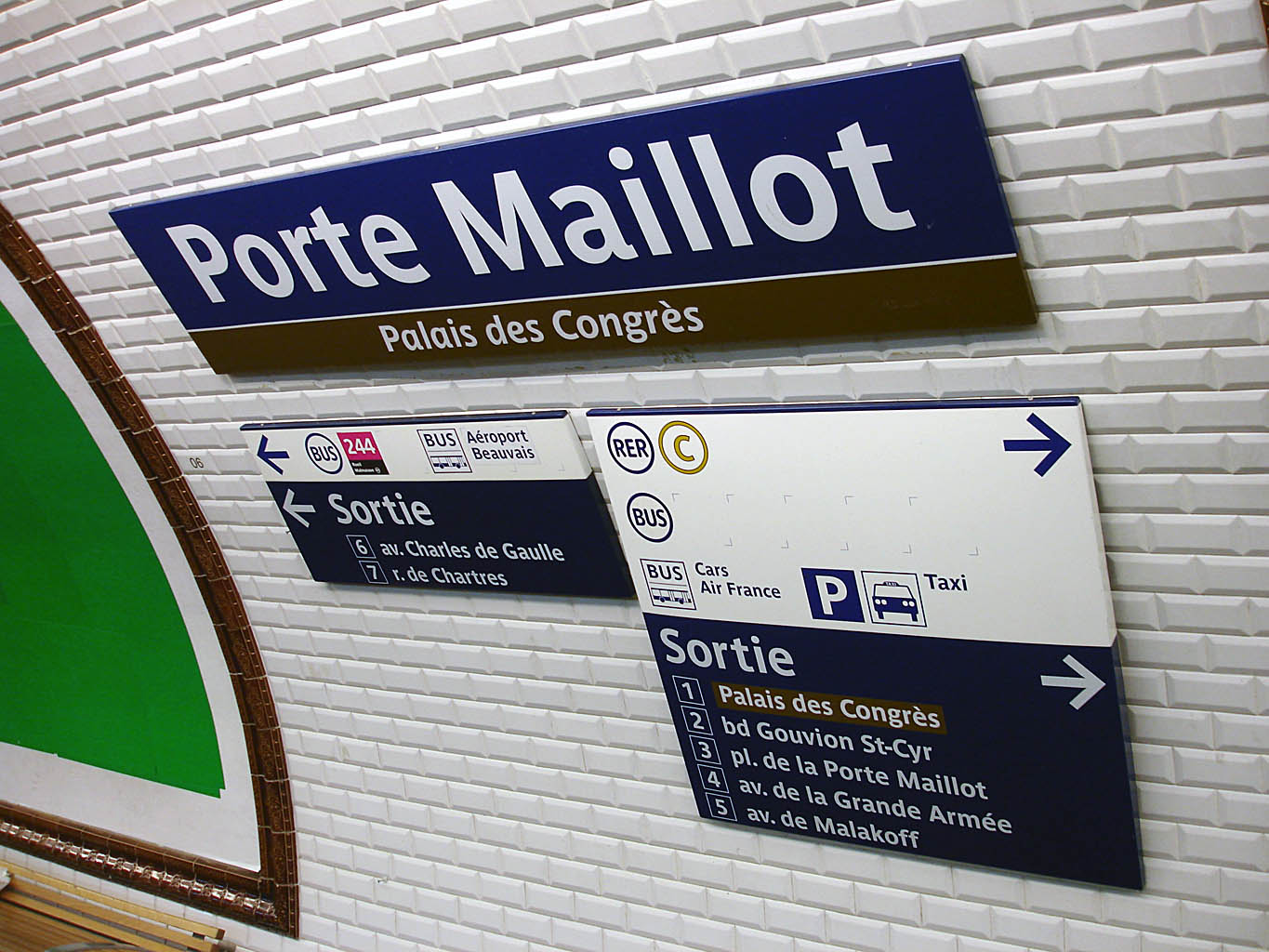
Platform Signage, exit and interchange signs
