= Paris Metro Line 1 =

Oldest rapid transit line of Paris, France

Line 1
- Paris Metro Line 1
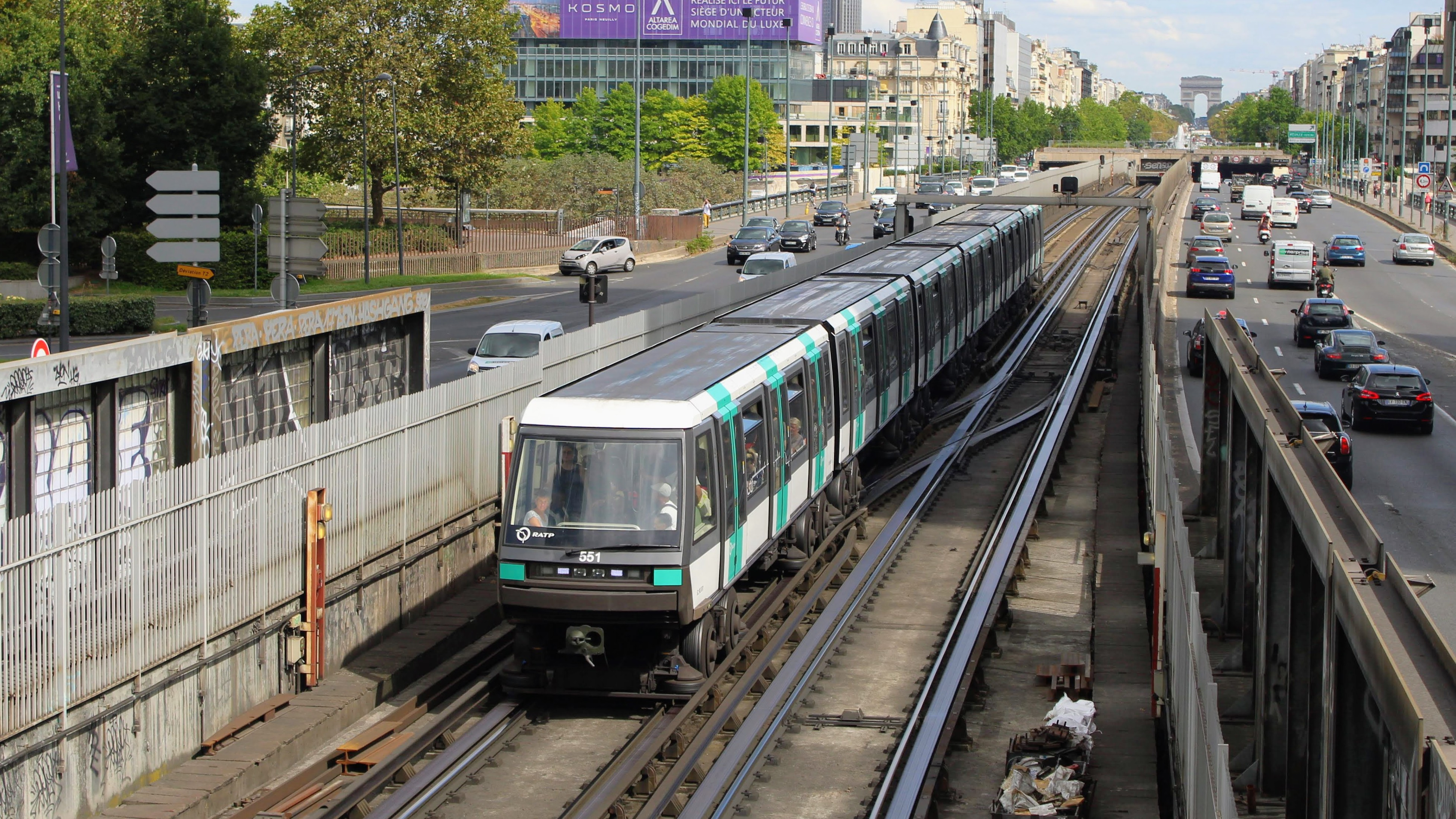
- MP 05 train crossing the Pont de Neuilly

Overview
- Locale: Puteaux, Courbevoie, Neuilly-sur-Seine, Paris, Saint-Mandé, Vincennes
- Termini: La Défense; Château de Vincennes
- Connecting lines: Paris Metro Paris Metro Line 2 Paris Metro Line 4 Paris Metro Line 5 Paris Metro Line 6 Paris Metro Line 7 Paris Metro Line 8 Paris Metro Line 9 Paris Metro Line 11 Paris Metro Line 12 Paris Metro Line 13 Paris Metro Line 14 RER RER A RER B RER C RER D RER E Transilien Transilien Line L (Paris-Saint-Lazare) Transilien Line R (Paris-Gare-de-Lyon) Transilien Line U Tramways in Île-de-France Île-de-France tramway Line 2 Île-de-France tramway Line 3a Île-de-France tramway Line 3b
- Stations: 25

Service
- System: Paris Metro
- Operator: RATP
- Rolling stock: MP 05 (56 trains as of 14 November 2026)
- Ridership: 169 million (avg. per year); 1st/16 (2025)

History
- Opened: 19 July 1900; 126 years ago

Technical
- Line length: 16.6 km (10.3 mi)
- Track gauge: 1,435 mm (4 ft 8 1/2 in) standard gauge
- Electrification: 750 V DC on guide bars
- Conduction system: Automated (SAET)
- Average inter-station distance: 692 m (2,270 ft)

Paris Metro Line 1 (French: Ligne 1 du métro de Paris) is one of the sixteen lines of the Paris Metro. It connects La Défense in the northwest and Château de Vincennes in the southeast. With a length of 16.5 km (10.3 mi), it constitutes an important east–west transportation route within the City of Paris. Excluding Réseau Express Régional (RER) commuter lines, it is the second busiest line on the network with 181.2 million travellers in 2017 or 750,000 people per day on average in Fall 2025.

The line was the network's first to open, with its inaugural section entering service in 1900. It is also the network's first line to be converted from manually driven operation to fully automated operation. Conversion, which commenced in 2007 and was completed in 2011, included new rolling stock (MP 05) and laying of platform edge doors in all stations. The first eight MP 05 trains (501 through 508) went into passenger service on 3 November 2011, allowing the accelerated transfer of the existing MP 89 CC stock to Line 4. The conversion allowed Line 1 to operate as the system's second fully automated line, after Line 14.

A transition to fully automated services was done without major interruption to passenger traffic. The new MP 05 rolling stock was able to operate efficiently alongside the manually-driven MP 89 CC rolling stock until there were enough MP 05 to no longer facilitate the need of the MP 89. Full automation was achieved for evening services in May 2012, with an increase to weekend services by August 2012. As of 15 December 2012, Line 1 is fully automated. The remaining five MP 89 CC trains remained stored on Line 1 near the Fontenay workshops until a new garage for Line 4 was opened south of the new Mairie de Montrouge station in February 2013. Line 1 is currently being extended to Val de Fontenay to make a link with Paris Metro Line 15, RER A, RER E and an extension of Tram 1.

== History ==
The Parisian metropolitan rail network has its origins in several decades of debate, more or less bizarre projects and tug of war between the State (which was favourable to the interconnection of large rail networks with large undergrounds) and the administration of the City of Paris (which wanted a small-scale network, serving only the inner city with very close stations, effectively prohibiting access to the rolling stock of the large railway companies). The deterioration of traffic conditions in Paris, the example of foreign capitals and the approach of the 1900 Universal Exhibition convinced the authorities to start construction of the metro. The solution proposed by the Mayor of Paris was finally adopted; the State conceded the design and construction of the work to the City of Paris. After the adoption by the municipal council on 20 April 1896 of the network project of Fulgence Bienvenüe and Edmond Huet, the "metropolitan railway" was declared a public utility by a law that became effective 30 March 1898.

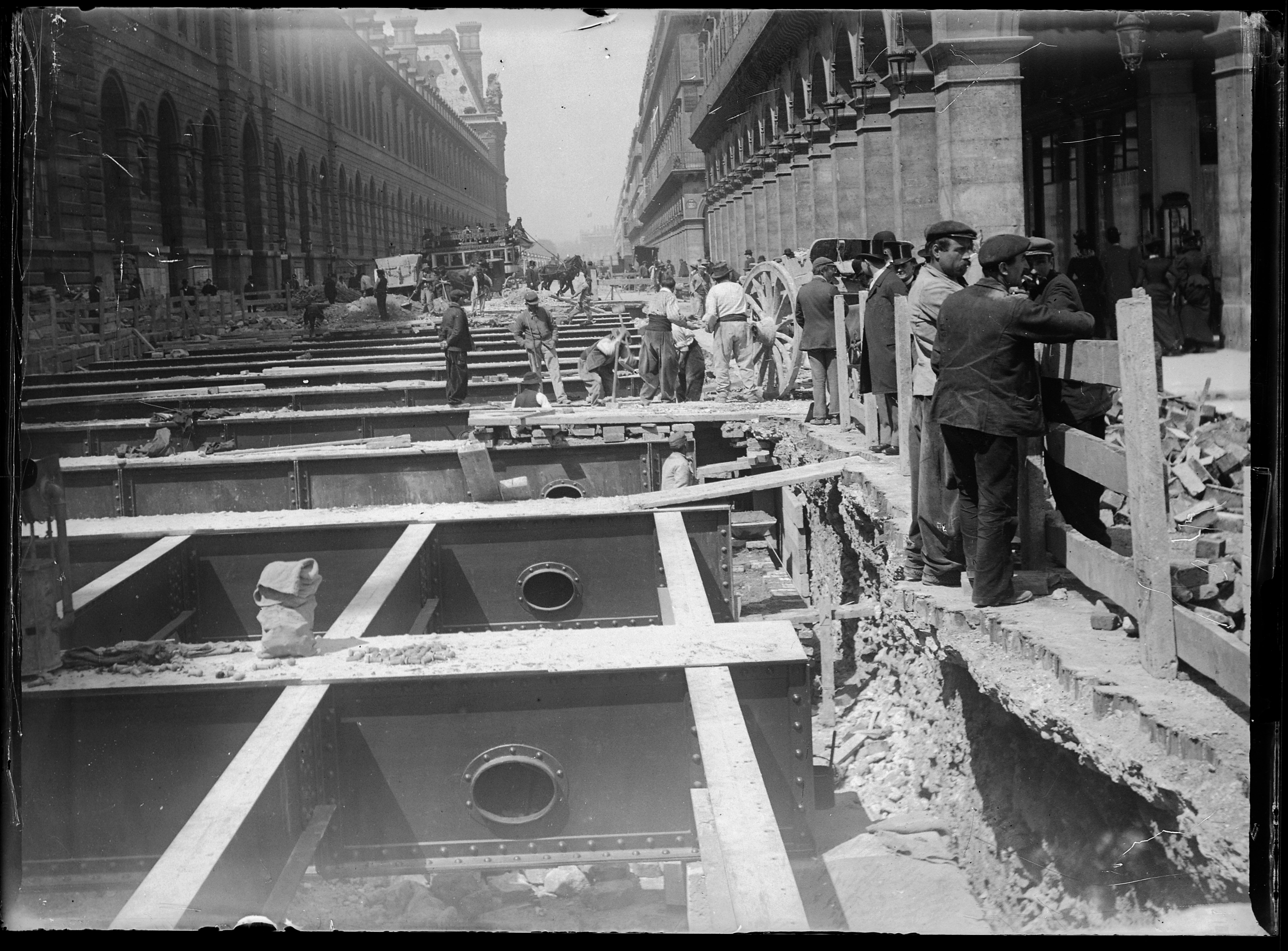
Construction work on Line 1's Palais Royal station on Rue de Rivoli. Photograph by Eugène Trutat kept at the Muséum de Toulouse.

This "railway of local interest" with electric traction, with a reduced loading gauge of 2.40 m (7 ft 10 in) wide and standard gauge, intended for the transport of passengers and their hand luggage, includes six lines:

- A: Porte de Vincennes – Porte Dauphine;
- B: Circular, by the old outer boulevards (Étoile – Nation – Étoile);
- C: Porte Maillot – Ménilmontant;
- D: Porte de Clignancourt – Porte d'Orléans;
- E: Boulevard de Strasbourg (Gare de l'Est) – Pont d'Austerlitz;
- F: Cours de Vincennes – Place d'Italie.

Three lines were planned as a possible option: Place Valhubert – Quai de Conti (on the south bank of the Seine), Place du Palais-Royal – Place du Danube and Auteuil – Place de l'Opéra.

Under an agreement of 27 January 1898 between the City and the Compagnie générale de traction, the network concessionaire, the company agreed to put the first three lines into service within eight years following the declaration of public utility. The first detailed traffic studies suggested swapping the termini of lines A and C: the trains on line A would terminate at Porte Maillot, constituting line 1 of the future network, while those on line C, the future line 3, would terminate at Porte Dauphine. It then also becomes possible to send the trains on the circular line to Porte Dauphine, and this terminus is then considered to be the start of line B.

Work on line 1 began on 4 October 1898, as part of an agreement between the Paris administration and the Compagnie du chemin de fer métropolitain de Paris (CMP), which stipulated that the city would build the network infrastructure (tunnels, stations), with the concessionaire building the superstructure (tracks and access to stations).

From November 1898, the Paris administration began preparatory work for the construction of the first line of the metropolitan railway: construction of service tunnels between the line and the Seine for the evacuation of spoil, relocation of the collector sewer on the Rue de Rivoli, and rearrangement of the water pipes. The work on the line itself was carried out in record time: it lasted twenty months and was led by Fulgence Bienvenüe, a bridges and roads engineer, and financed by the city of Paris. The line was divided into eleven lots divided between several companies. Eleven shields (a type of tunnel boring machine) were built for this work and installed under the roadways, with which approximately 2,500 m (8,200 ft) of tunnel were dug, including more than 1,500 m (4,900 ft) by the three Champigneul shields which dug from the Place de la Nation (in both directions) and that of the Porte Maillot. In order to reduce the duration of the construction site, however, the construction also made extensive use of traditional methods of galleries supported by pit props. Cut and cover work was only used for the construction of certain stations and a very small section of tunnel.

On 15 June 1900, Line 1 was handed over by the Paris administration to its operator, la Compagnie du chemin de fer métropolitain de Paris (the Paris Metropolitan Railway Company), which ran its trains to test the line and train personnel.

=== Commissioning ===
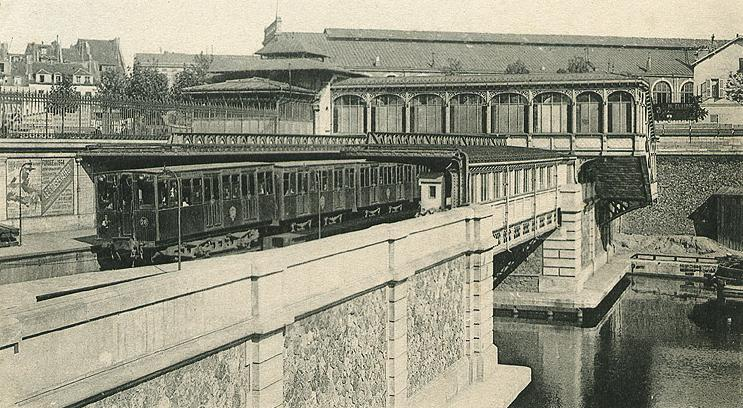
Line 1 at Bastille, in 1903. The train is hauled by a “Thomson-double” railcar.

On 19 July 1900 at 1 p.m., the line was opened to the public between Porte Maillot and Porte de Vincennes to connect the various sites of the Universal Exhibition and serve the events of the 1900 Olympic Games in the Bois de Vincennes. It followed the monumental west-east axis in Paris. The line was inaugurated in a very discreet manner, because the Compagnie du chemin de fer métropolitain de Paris wanted a gradual increase in capacity. Only eight stations were completed and opened at the inauguration, while the other ten were gradually opened between 6 August and 1 September 1900. (Note: Stations opened at the start of services were: Porte de Vincennes, Nation, Gare de Lyon, Bastille, Hôtel de Ville, Palais Royal–Musée du Louvre, Champs-Élysées–Clemenceau and Porte Maillot.) These eighteen stations were entirely built under the supervision of the engineer Fulgence Bienvenüe. Most of them were 75 m (246 ft) long and their platforms were 4.1 m (13 ft) wide. The external entrance canopies (or edicules) were designed by the emblematic architect of Art Nouveau, Hector Guimard.

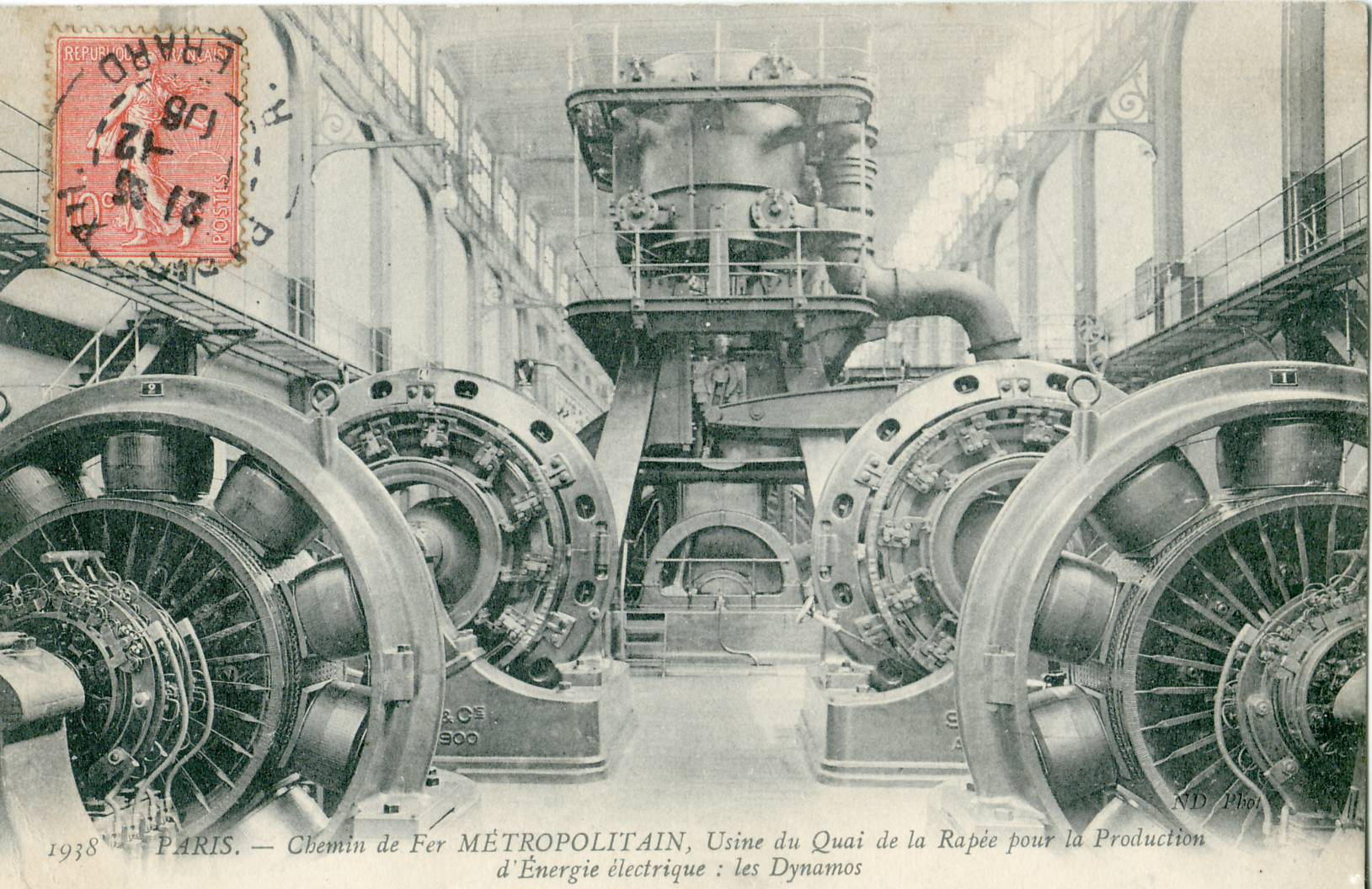
The generators of the CMP Bercy power station, commissioned in March 1901.

Electricity was supplied, from March 1901, by the large power station that the CMP had built in the Bercy district, behind its administration building on the Quai de Bercy, where the RATP house, the company's headquarters, was now located. This plant supplied three-phase current at 5,000 volts 25 hertz, with its eighteen boilers with a heating surface of 244 m^{2} (2,630 sq ft) and its three 1,500 kW generator sets. Before the Bercy plant was commissioned, electricity was supplied by the companies Le Triphasé (Asnières-sur-Seine) and the Compagnie générale de traction (Moulineaux).

Parisians were immediately won over by this new means of transport, which allowed substantial time savings in conditions of better comfort than the forms of transport available on the surface. It was soon necessary to increase the frequency and length of the trains. Initially, operations began with a train every ten minutes, then every six minutes at peak times. At the end of January 1901, the frequency increased to one train every three minutes, in order to better meet the high demand, without however ending congestion, which reached four million cumulative passengers on 11 December 1900, or 130,000 per day.

The original trains had three cars, later increased to four, forming trains 36 m (118 ft) long. They therefore only occupied half of the station platforms, which were 75 m (246 ft) long. These all-wooden cars had only two single-leaf doors per side and the trains ran on axles, rather than bogies. The lengthening of the trains, which was easy to implement, was agreed, with the gradual replacement of the M1 motor cars and their 9 m (30 ft)-metre trailers by "Thomson-double" railcars and new trailers. The latter were equipped with double-leaf doors, improving the flow of passengers at the station. The composition of the trains reached six, seven and finally eight cars in 1902, with two motor cars flanking six trailers.

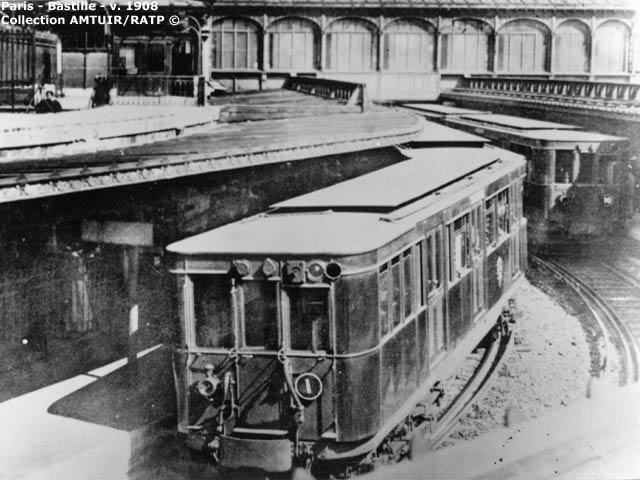
Sprague-Thomson train at Bastille station in 1908.

In 1905, the first trailers with axles disappeared completely and gave way to trains composed of seven cars, reduced to six cars in April 1906 with three motor cars flanking three short bogie trailers. In 1908, the equipment was modified again: new long cars of the Sprague-Thomson 500 class appeared. Their introduction on the line was possible thanks to the slight relocation of Bastille station with curves of a larger radius allowing the passage of longer cars. The sets increased to five cars, with three motor cars and two trailers.

Nevertheless, the continuous increase in traffic highlighted the lack of capacity of the rolling stock: a new class of trains appeared during the 1920s, with even longer cars, 13.6 m (45 ft) long, and engines with "small boxes", leaving more space for passengers. The five-car trains only had two engines for three trailers.

=== Extensions to the suburbs ===
On 24 March 1934, a first extension to the suburbs was put into service to the east to Château de Vincennes, leading to the abandonment of the return loop at Porte de Vincennes.

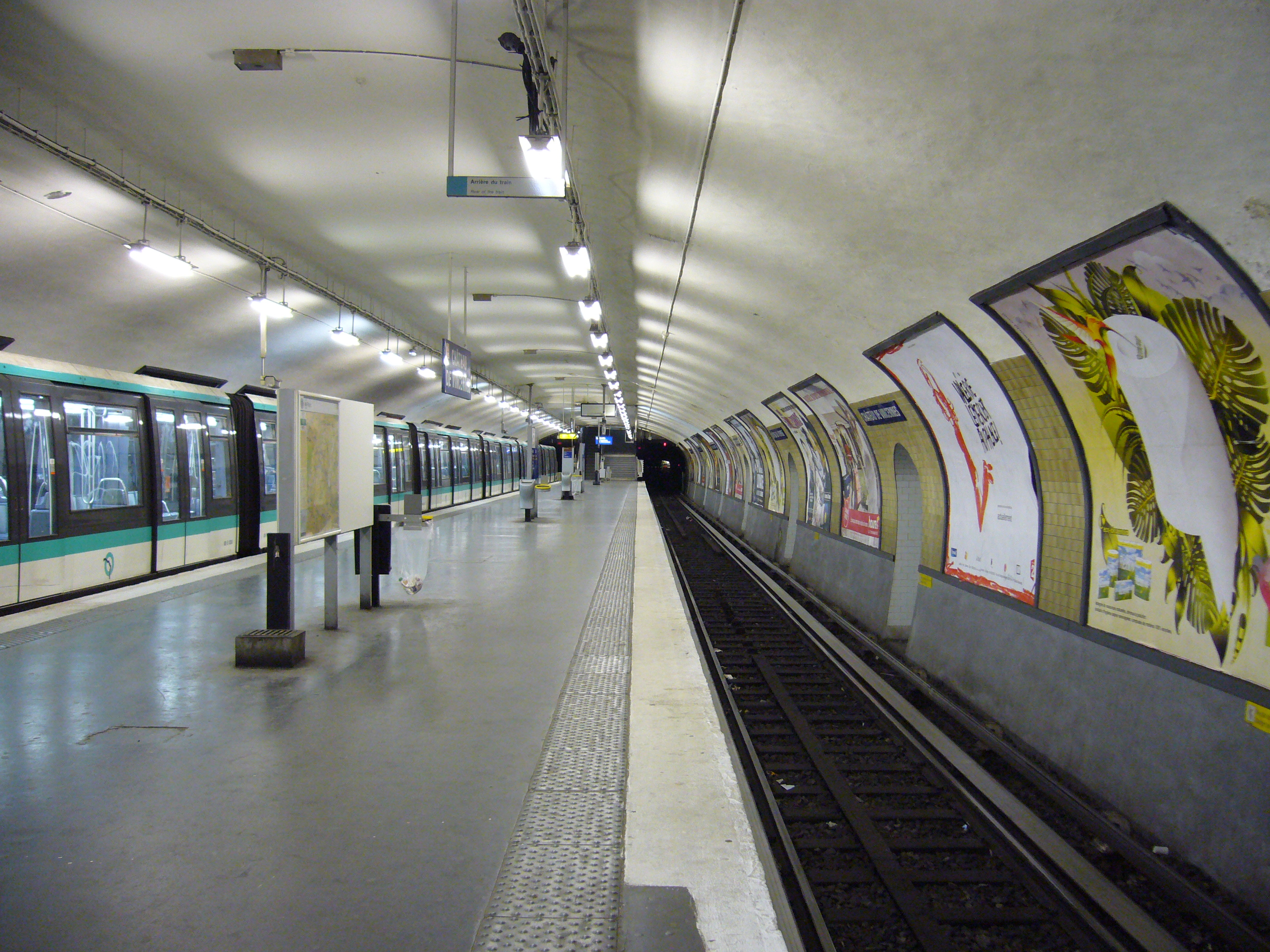
The Château de Vincennes terminus in 2008.

After the completion of the first three metro extensions outside the city of Paris to Vincennes, Boulogne-Billancourt and Issy-les-Moulineaux in 1934, the general council of the Seine department decided to build four new extensions, including a 2.3 km (1.4 mi) western extension of line 1 to Pont de Neuilly.

The extension to the Pont de Neuilly faced several difficulties: the terminal loop at Porte Maillot station had been built in 1900 at a shallow depth, at approximately the same level as the Petite Ceinture line. It was therefore essential to reroute the line at the start of the return loop in order to lower the tunnel below the Petite Ceinture and to build a new Porte Maillot station. This work, undertaken in 1935, located within the old city walls, was the responsibility of the Paris city hall. The temporary terminus at Porte Maillot had four tracks divided into two ordinary stations with side platforms: the depth of the tunnel ruled out the construction of a single vaulted terminus of the type used at Porte de Charenton station. The old loop was thus abandoned and the line extended to the new terminus at Porte Maillot on 15 November 1936.

Beyond this section, the work was taken over by the Seine department: the tunnel was built under the Avenue de Neuilly. Originally planned with three stations, the extension ultimately only had two, including the terminus of Pont de Neuilly. The latter, with only two tracks, was designed as a temporary terminus, because it was then planned to extend the line to La Défense with an under-river crossing of the Seine. This "provisional" station, which lasted more than fifty years, would be the cause of numerous operating problems twenty or thirty years later. The work on line 1 was actively carried out in order to be completed before the 1937 World's Fair. The line was opened for operation to Pont de Neuilly on 29 April 1937.

=== The pneumatic metro and the creation of the RER ===
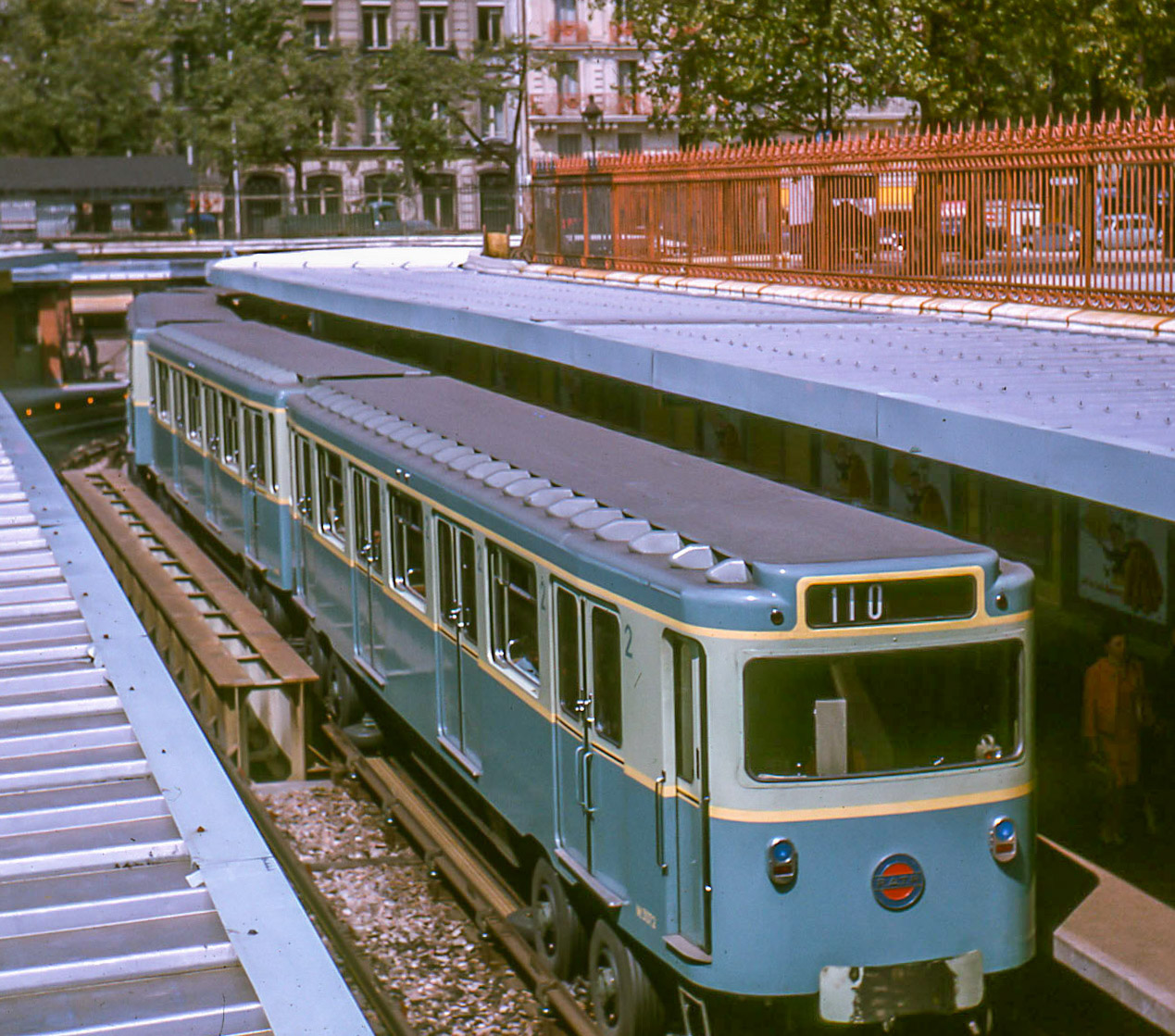
MP 59 set in original livery at Bastille in 1964.

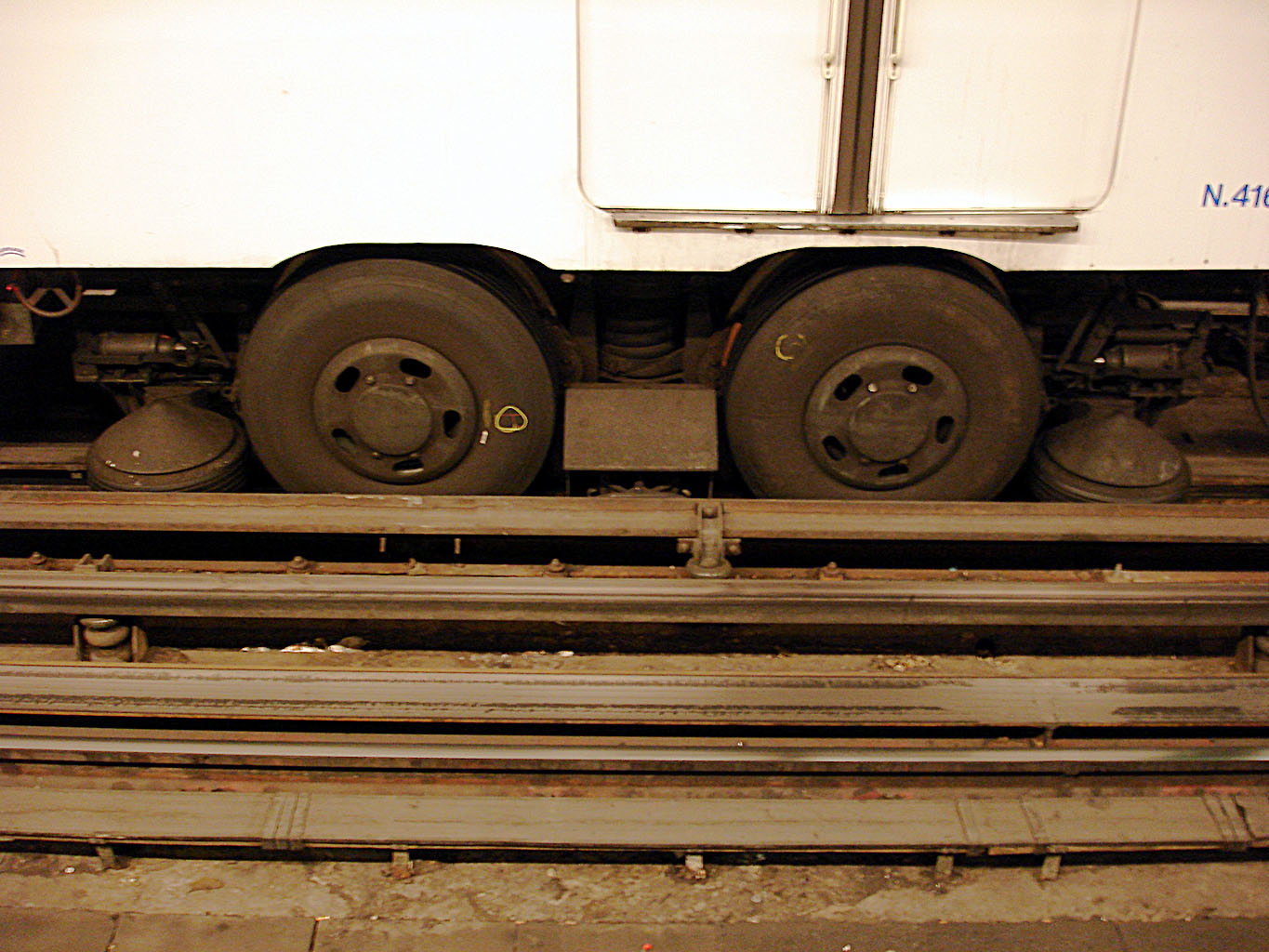
Bogies and tires of an MP 59

During the Second World War, and for the next two decades, Line 1, the busiest on the network, saw its ridership increase to the point of reaching significant overloads (up to 135% of its capacity), which degraded operation and transport conditions. Given the success of the experiment with pneumatic-tyred metro operations on Line 11, it was decided to equip Line 1 with this type of equipment in order to increase its capacity by 15 to 20% or more, as the pneumatic-tyred equipment could achieve greater acceleration and deceleration, which increased the commercial speed and rotation of rolling stock. Work began at the end of 1960, but, taking into account the experience of Line 11, the tire tracks were built of metal between stations and of concrete in stations. The new operation of Line 1 began on 30 May 1963. The line was equipped with MP 59 rolling stock from May 1963 to December 1964, replacing the grey Sprague trains. In April 1972, line 1 was the third on the network (after line 11 and Line 4) to be equipped with Grecque electronic automatic piloting equipment.

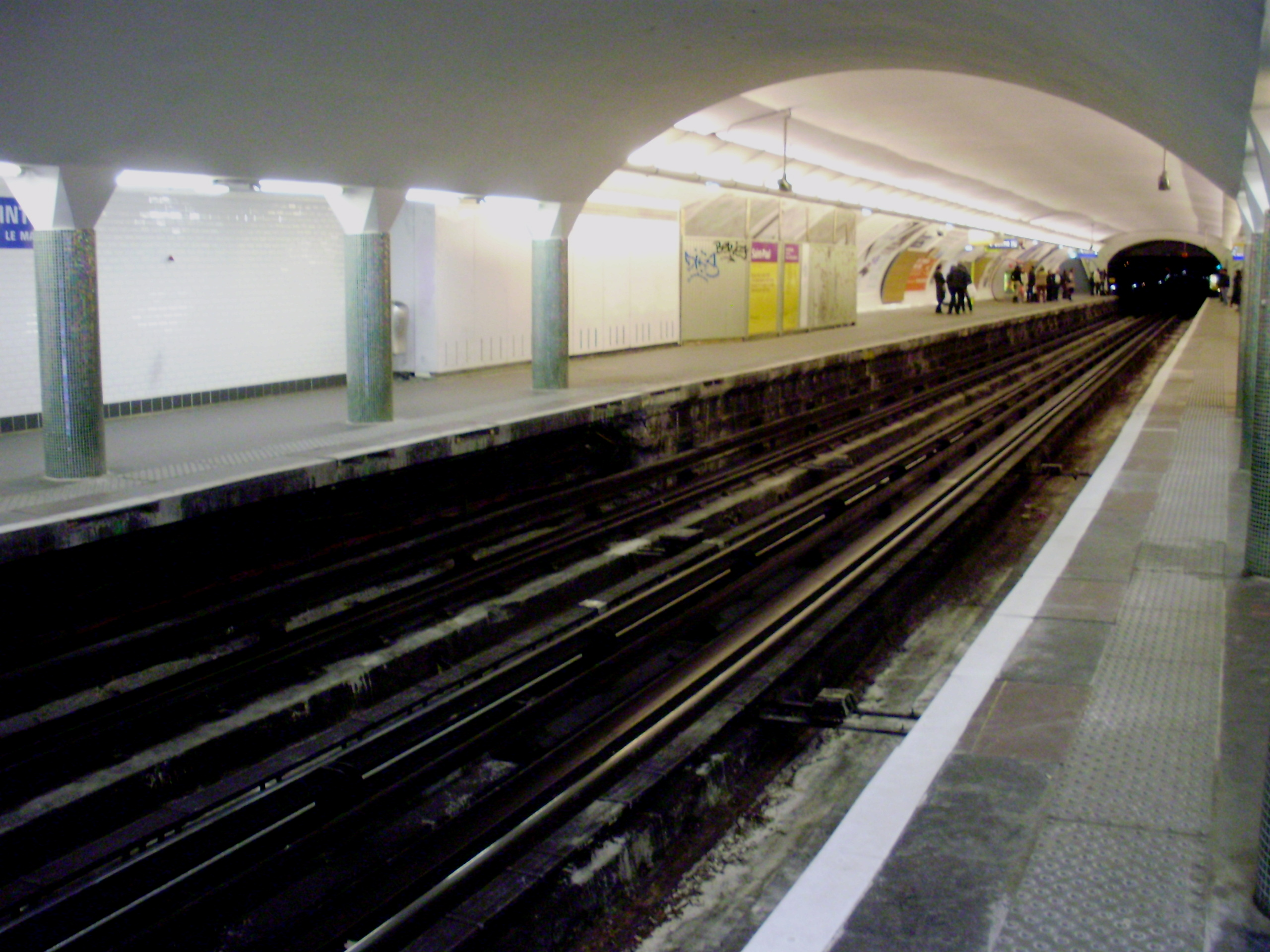
The "crypt" of Saint-Paul station in 2010

This increase in capacity being insufficient pending the opening of the large-gauge east-west regional line then under construction, it was also decided to increase the number of cars from five to six and the length of the platforms accordingly to 90 m (300 ft). (Note: The operation of the line by seven-car trains, i.e. 105 m (344 ft), initially envisaged, was not possible without undertaking very major works at Étoile and Bastille, the enlargement of the stations was limited to 90 metres, allowing the accommodation of six-car trains.) Some less frequented stations were lengthened by the construction of "crypts", the ceiling of which rest on very closely-spaced pillars.

However, this development alone was not enough to cope with the constant growth of traffic on the east-west axis. The SDAURP (Schéma directeur d'aménagement et d'urbanisme de la région parisienne, "Master plan for development and urban planning of the Paris region"), published in 1965 under the leadership of Prefect Paul Delouvrier, provided for the creation of a large-gauge regional rail transport network on the scale of the urban area. This highly ambitious plan, already outlined in the 1920s, provided for the priority creation of a major east-west axis, to support regional growth, serve the new business district of La Défense and relieve some of the traffic on metro Line 1 and Gare Saint-Lazare, then the busiest in France.

The work on the new east-west line also caused an incident on line 1: on the Étoile side, the tunnel of the new link was attacked by an American Robbins tunnel boring machine, delivered in June 1964. Tunnelling began in March 1965 and proved to be fast, but while drilling under the Avenue de la Grande-Armée and under metro line 1, the tunnel foundation collapsed on 18 March due to decompression of the ground. Metro train traffic was interrupted for four days so that the infrastructure could be repaired.

The new line was put into service in sections: first, Nation – Boissy-Saint-Léger at the end of 1969, then La Défense – Étoile shuttle in 1970, the extension of the latter to Auber in 1971, the integration of the Nanterre – Saint-Germain-en-Laye section in 1972. Then, finally, it was the extension to Noisy-le-Grand – Mont d'Est and the opening of the central Auber – Nation section that completed the RER A line on 9 December 1977 after five more years of monumental works in the heart of Paris. From the first months of 1978, the transfer of traffic to the new line A was significant: several lines of the urban metro recorded a drop in ridership. Line 1, which had been doubled over most of its route, saw its traffic decrease by 25%, which finally made it possible to achieve more reasonable loading during peak hours.

=== The metro at La Défense and the creation of line 14 ===
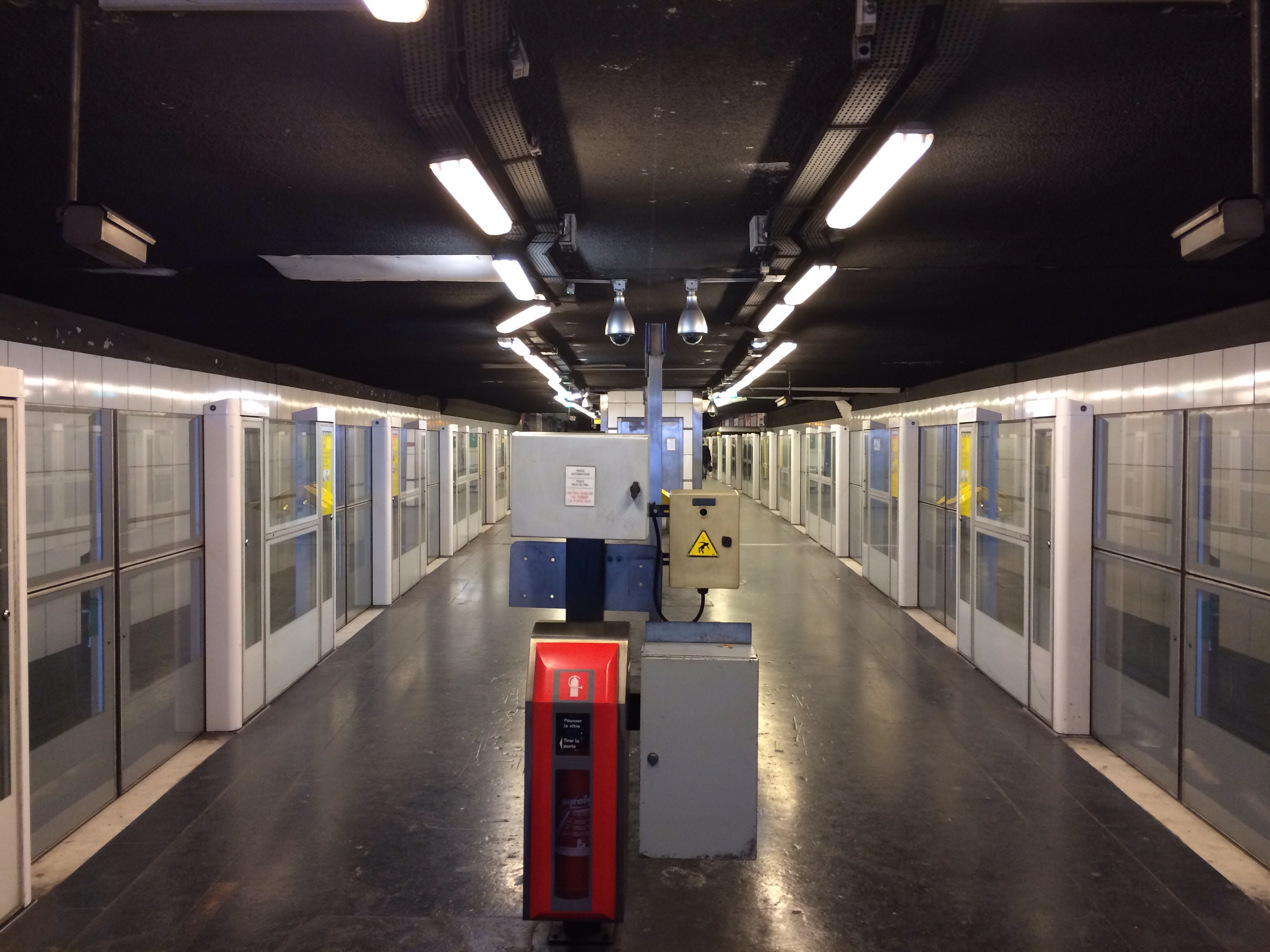
Esplanade de La Défense station in 2014

The extension planned since the 1930s was finally completed to La Défense 1 April 1992. However, unlike the original project, the river was crossed, not by a new under-river crossing, but in the middle of the Pont de Neuilly, in order to significantly reduce construction costs and because of the presence of the RER line A tunnel, built during the 1960s. This modification required the complete reconstruction of the rear of the Pont de Neuilly station. The bridge itself was widened by the construction of new cantilevered sidewalks over the Seine, in order to free up sufficient space for the metro in its middle. The land reserved twenty years earlier by L'Établissement public pour l'aménagement de la région de la Défense (Public Establishment for the Development of the La Défense Region, EPAD) for the extension, including in particular the La Défense - Michelet and Élysées - La Défense stations, therefore remained unused in favour of a passage via what was to be one of the two tubes of the A14 autoroute (which passes through a tunnel under La Défense).

Ironically, the considerable success of RER line A, which quickly became the busiest transport line in France, led to its rapid saturation, with 272.8 million passengers in 2004. In order to limit the overload, the Council of Ministers decided in October 1989 to create a new RER line, EOLE, and a new fully automatic metro line which opened in October 1998 under the name metro line 14. Despite its very rapid increase in capacity (19 million passengers in 1999, 64.1 million in 2004), it did not reduce the constant increase in traffic on metro line 1, nor on RER line A, which has always been on the verge of saturation.

=== Automation ===
After successfully opening Line 14 as a fully automated line, the RATP began to explore the possibility of automating existing lines on the system. The agency first focused on Line 1, since it is the busiest of all of the Paris subway lines, and also the line most frequented by tourists. Automation not only allowed Paris to remain as a model for technological innovations in the railway industry but also increases the number of lines in normal service when RATP workers are striking (MP 05 rolling stock). This was shown when the transport union engaged in industrial action in September 2019 without affecting service on Line 1.

Work began in 2007 and was largely carried out without interrupting passenger traffic. Preliminary work involved electrical and signaling upgrades throughout the entire line. Work also commenced on converting the original Porte Maillot station (also known as "Espace Maillot") into a light maintenance facility for the MP 05 rolling stock. In 2009, work commenced on installing platform screen doors; with Bérault and Porte Maillot being the first stations to be equipped. Due to its curved platform, Bastille (in 2011) was among the last stations to be equipped. During this time, individual stations were intermittently closed to allow platforms to be leveled with the height of the train floors (from fr:Ligne 1 du métro de Paris).

Although most of the stations remain the same as they were prior to automation (with the exception of the platform screen doors), many stations like St. Paul, received brand new signage. Franklin D. Roosevelt received a complete overhaul from its post World War II facade to a more contemporary & modern look.

On 3 November 2011, the first eight trains of the new MP 05 rolling stock were put into service on Line 1. These trains ran alongside the MP 89 CC rolling stock until enough automated stock was available for passenger service. This cascading was achieved thanks to the SAET (French: Système d'automatisation de l'exploitation des trains) system, which is the first version of Siemens Mobility's Trainguard MT CBTC. The arrival of the new stock allowed the RATP to accelerate transfer of the MP 89 from Line 1 to Line 4 at a rate of about 2 to 3 trains per month between November 2011 and November 2012. That rate increased to 4 trains per month during November and December 2012.

Major milestones were reached in May and July 2012 as full automation reached sufficient levels by which the MP 89 were no longer needed during late evenings and weekends respectively. For the Nuit Blanche during October 2012, Line 1 also operated in full automation. The final milestone was reached on 15 December 2012, as full automation of Line 1 approached 100%, allowing the remaining MP 89 trains to be pulled from regular service on 21 December 2012. Due to insufficient storage space on Line 4, the remaining 6 to 7 MP 89 trains remained stored on the Line 1 tracks near Fontenay until a new garage in the Montrouge area opened. That opening was tentatively set for February/March 2013 and will coincide with the opening of the new Mairie de Montrouge station opening on Line 4. Since 16 February 2013, a year later than what was planned in 2010, the line has been fully automated. The final adjustments were completed on Sunday, 28 July 2013. It thus became one of the first lines in the world transformed into a full automatic line and not designed as such from the start.

On 22 January 2016, at around 5 p.m., all of the trains on Line 1 came to a standstill due to a computer malfunction. Most of them were in the stations, but sixteen of them, stuck in the tunnel, had to be evacuated with the help of agents who have come to “free” the travelers. Traffic resumed only in the next morning. This breakdown, described as historic by the RATP, is the consequence of a bug that occurred in the automatic pilot system which has been fitted in line 1 since 2013.

== Chronology ==
- 20 April 1896: the Paris City Council adopts the Fulgence Bienvenüe network project.
- 30 March 1898: declaration of public utility of the first six lines of the "metropolitan railway".
- 4 October 1898: launch of works of Line 1.
- 19 July 1900: Inauguration of Line 1 between Porte de Vincennes and Porte Maillot. Only 8 of the 18 planned stations were opened.
- 6 August and 1 September 1900: The other 10 stations of the line opened.
- 24 March 1934: The line was extended to the east from Porte de Vincennes to Château de Vincennes.
- 15 November 1936: Porte Maillot station was rebuilt in order to allow a further extension of the line to the west.
- 29 April 1937: The line was extended to the west from Porte Maillot to Pont de Neuilly.
- 1963: The rails were converted in order to accommodate rubber-tyred trains (the MP 59). At the same time, stations were enlarged in order to accommodate 6-car trains instead of 5-car trains.
- 1 April 1992: The line was extended again to the west from Pont de Neuilly to La Défense business district.
- 1997: MP 89 CC rolling stock was introduced, replacing the older MP 59 stock.
- 2007: Automation project commenced.
- 3 November 2011: Cascading of MP 89CC to MP 05 stock began, as the automation project (construction) was completed.
- May 2012: Full automation is achieved for evening services.
- July 2012: Full automation is achieved for weekend services.
- 15 December 2012: Full automation reaches 100% status, allowing the MP 89CC to no longer be needed on Line 1.

== Rolling stock ==
Line 1 has had five different types of rolling stock throughout the years:

- M1 (Westinghouse): 1900–1921
- Sprague-Thomson: 1913–1964
- MP 59: 1963–1998
- MP 89CC: 1997–2012
- MP 05: 2011–present

== Future ==
A western extension of Line 1 from La Défense station to the center of Nanterre is being considered. Another proposal being investigated would have a new station constructed at Fontenay – Rigollots, just before the line climbs to the surface to enter Fontenay shops, and then continue eastward to Val de Fontenay to connect with RER lines A and E.

== Stations ==
Station	Image	Commune	Opened	Interchanges	Distance (in km)	
La Défense; Grand Arche		Puteaux	1 April 1992	Tramways in Île-de-France Île-de-France tramway Line 2 RER RER A RER E Transilien Transilien Line L (Paris-Saint-Lazare) Transilien Line U	–	0.0
Esplanade de La Défense		Courbevoie, Puteaux	1 April 1992		0.9	0.9
Pont de Neuilly		Neuilly-sur-Seine	29 April 1937		0.8	1.7
Les Sablons; Jardin d'Acclimatation		Neuilly-sur-Seine	29 April 1937		1.0	2.7
Porte Maillot; Palais des Congrès		Paris (16th, 17th)	19 July 1900	(at Neuilly–Porte Maillot)	1.0	3.7
Argentine		Paris (16th, 17th)	1 September 1900		0.5	4.2
Charles de Gaulle–Étoile		Paris (8th, 16th, 17th)	1 September 1900	Paris Metro Paris Metro Line 2 Paris Metro Line 6 RER RER A	0.5	4.7
George V		Paris (8th)	13 August 1900		0.5	5.2
Franklin D. Roosevelt		Paris (8th)	19 July 1900	Paris Metro Paris Metro Line 9	0.7	5.9
Champs-Élysées–Clemenceau; Grand Palais		Paris (8th)	1 September 1900	Paris Metro Paris Metro Line 13	0.3	6.2
Concorde		Paris (1st, 8th)	13 August 1900	Paris Metro Paris Metro Line 8 Paris Metro Line 12	0.6	6.8
Tuileries		Paris (1st)	19 July 1900		0.7	7.5
Palais Royal–Musée du Louvre		Paris (1st)	19 July 1900	Paris Metro Paris Metro Line 7	0.5	8.0
Louvre–Rivoli		Paris (1st)	13 August 1900		0.3	8.3
Châtelet		Paris (1st, 4th)	6 August 1900	(at Châtelet–Les Halles)	0.5	8.8
Hôtel de Ville		Paris (4th)	19 July 1900	Paris Metro Paris Metro Line 11	0.3	9.1
Saint-Paul; Le Marais		Paris (4th)	6 August 1900		0.7	9.8
Bastille		Paris (4th, 11th, 12th)	19 July 1900	Paris Metro Paris Metro Line 5 Paris Metro Line 8	0.7	10.5
Gare de Lyon		Paris (12th)	19 July 1900	(at Gare de Lyon) (at Gare de Lyon)	0.8	11.3
Reuilly–Diderot		Paris (12th)	20 August 1900	Paris Metro Paris Metro Line 8	1.1	12.4
Nation		Paris (11th, 12th)	19 July 1900	Paris Metro Paris Metro Line 2 Paris Metro Line 6 Paris Metro Line 9 RER RER A	0.7	13.1
Porte de Vincennes		Paris (12th, 20th)	19 July 1900	Tramways in Île-de-France Île-de-France tramway Line 3a Île-de-France tramway Line 3b	1.1	14.2
Saint-Mandé		Saint-Mandé	24 March 1934		0.6	14.8
Bérault		Saint-Mandé, Vincennes	24 March 1934		0.7	15.5
Château de Vincennes		Vincennes	24 March 1934	(at Vincennes)	0.7	16.2

=== Renamed stations ===
Date	Old name	New name
27 May 1920	Alma station	George V
5 May 1931	Reuilly station	Reuilly-Diderot
20 May 1931	Champs-Élysées	Champs-Élysées–Clemenceau
26 April 1937	Tourelle	Tourelle–Saint-Mandé
6 October 1942	Marbeuf	Marbeuf–Rond-Point des Champs-Élysées
30 October 1946	Marbeuf–Rond-Point des Champs-Élysées	Franklin D. Roosevelt
25 May 1948	Obligado	Argentine
1970	Étoile	Charles de Gaulle–Étoile
1989	Palais Royal	Palais Royal–Musée du Louvre*
1989	Louvre	Louvre–Rivoli*
1997	Grande Arche de la Défense	La Défense
26 July 2002	Tourelle—Saint-Mandé	Saint-Mandé

* The Louvre station renamings were made after the entrance to the museum was moved following construction of the Louvre Pyramid.

== Tourism ==
Line 1 passes near several places of interest:

- La Défense high-rise business district, where the most prominent landmark is the Grande Arche. The La Défense Arena, home of the Racing 92 rugby union club and host venue for the 2024 Summer Olympics, is nearby.
- The Arc de Triomphe at Charles de Gaulle-Étoile. A 289 step staircase is open to the public and leads to the top of the Arch. There is also a museum on the top floor.
- The Avenue des Champs-Élysées, a famous shopping street.
- The Place de la Concorde, dominated by the Obelisk, Tuileries Garden and Louvre.
- Louvre–Rivoli station has replicas of works of art from the museum and has historical information. The station's benches are made of glass and the Western portal has Roman-inspired arches along the platform edge.
- The Hôtel de Ville (Paris City Hall) and the Marais district.
- Bastille and the nearby Opera.
- Gare de Lyon train station.
- The Place de la Nation.
- The Bois de Vincennes (Vincennes Wood) and Paris Zoological Park (Vincennes Zoo).
- The Château de Vincennes. A medieval castle to the east of Paris.

== Gallery ==
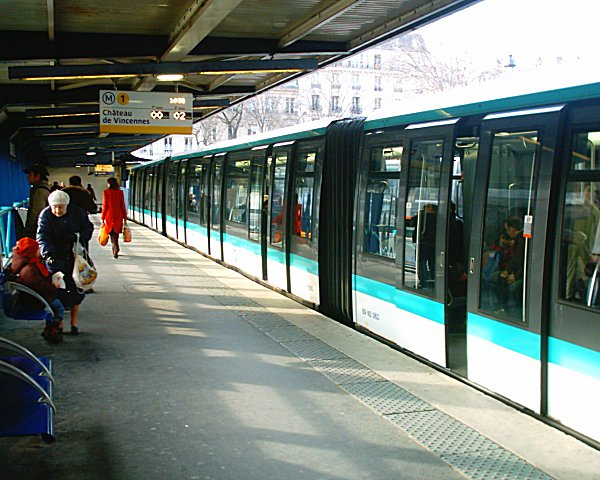
Bastille station

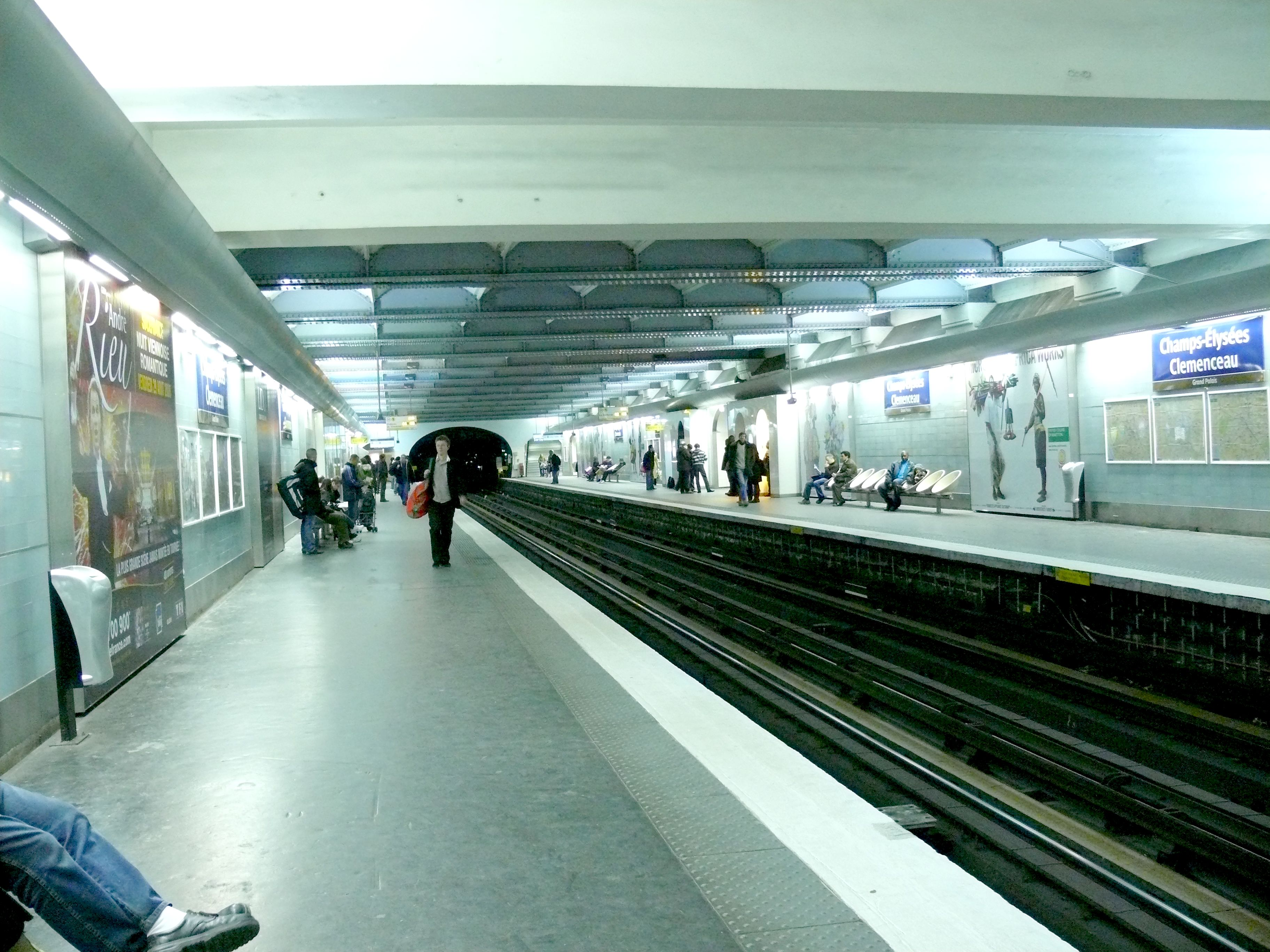
Champs-Élysées – Clemenceau

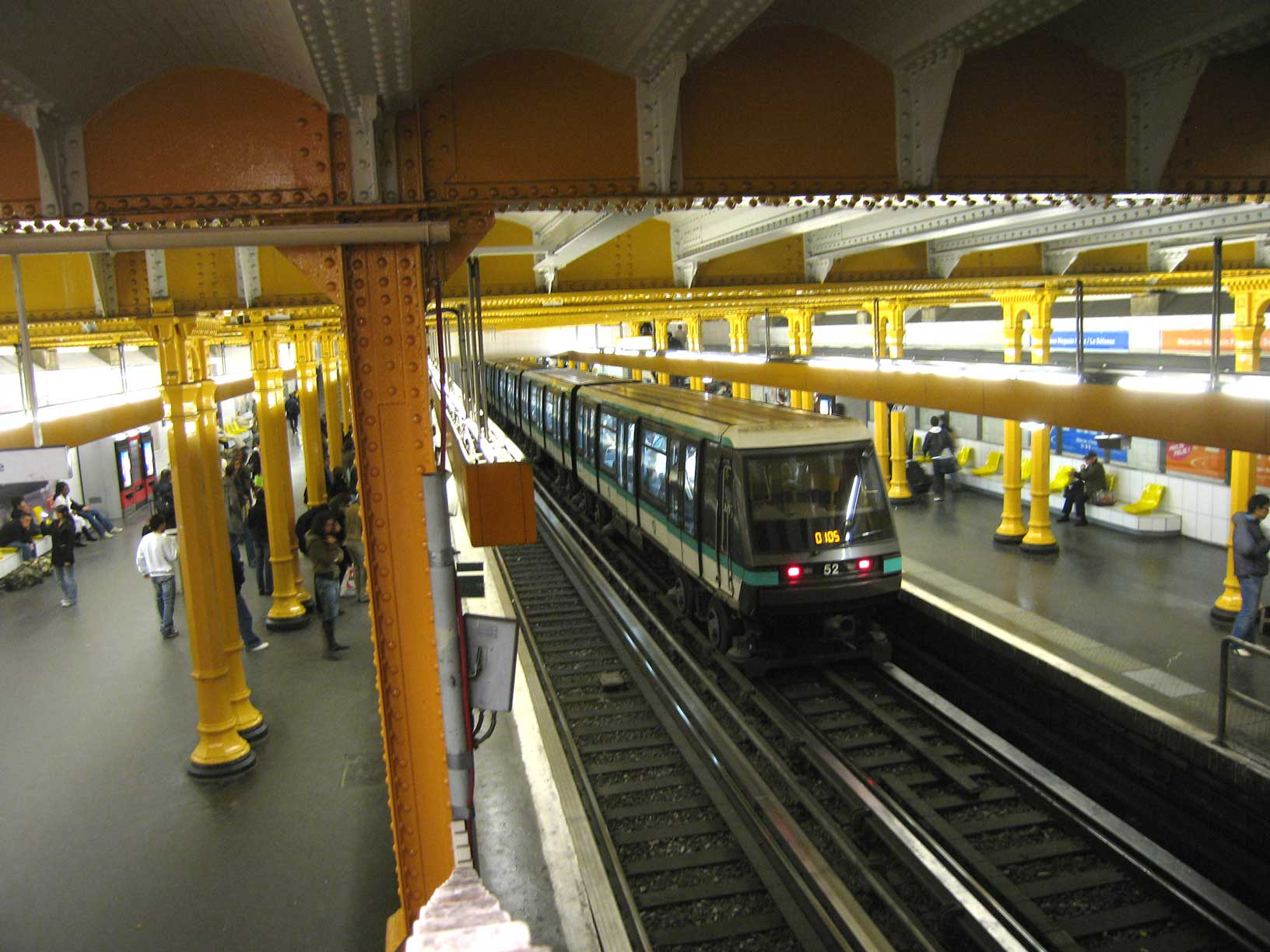
Gare de Lyon

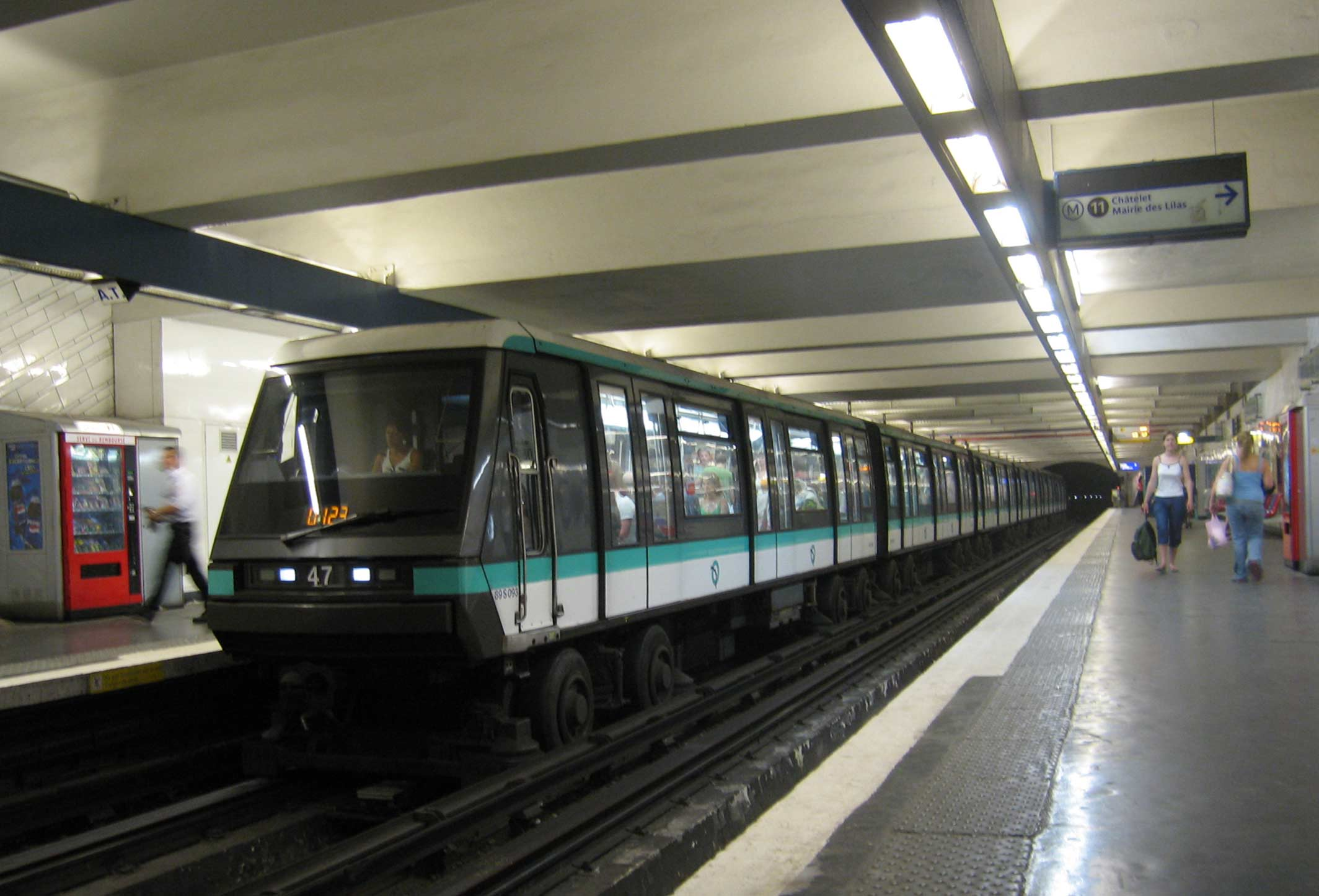
Hôtel de Ville

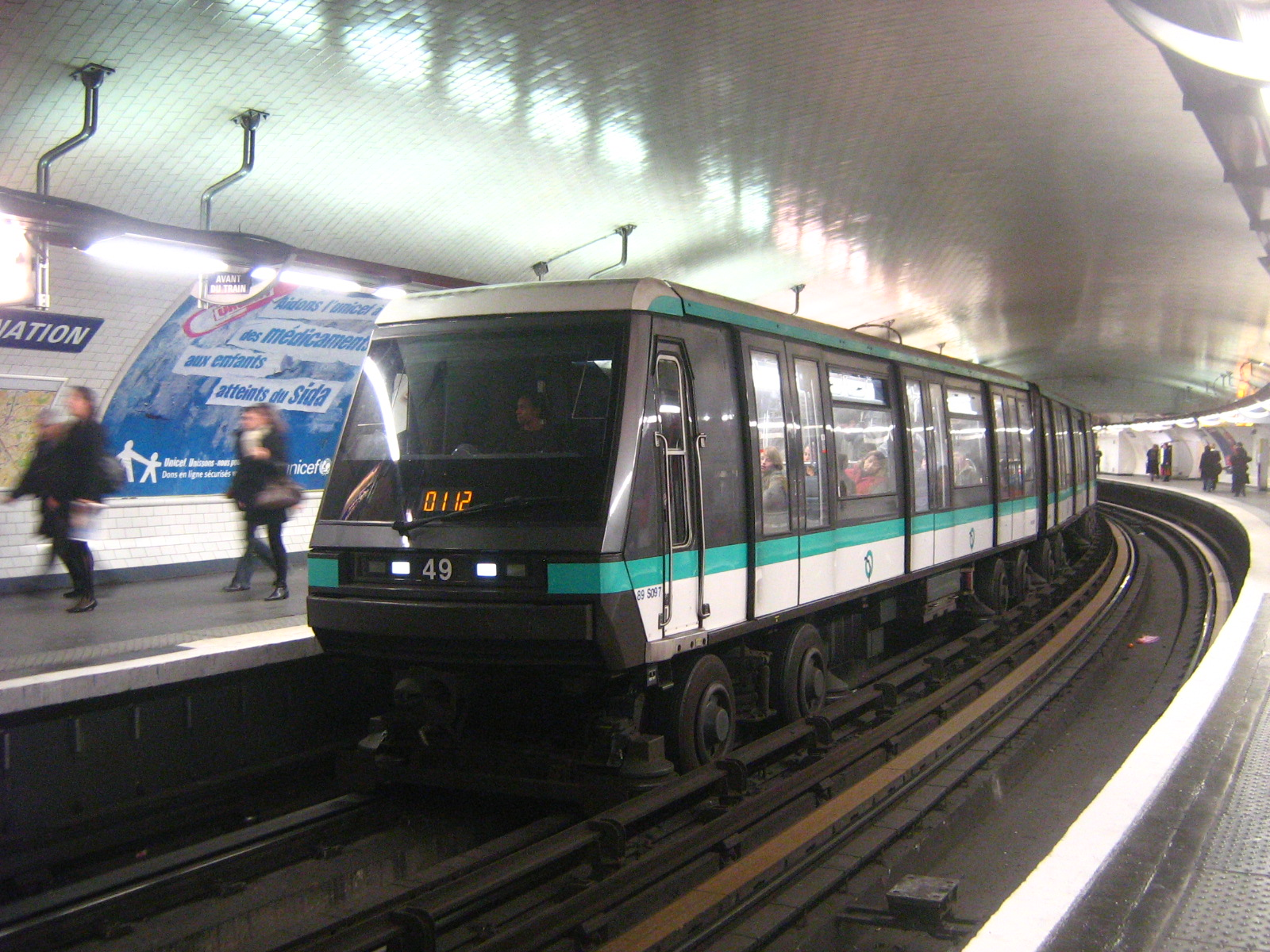
Nation

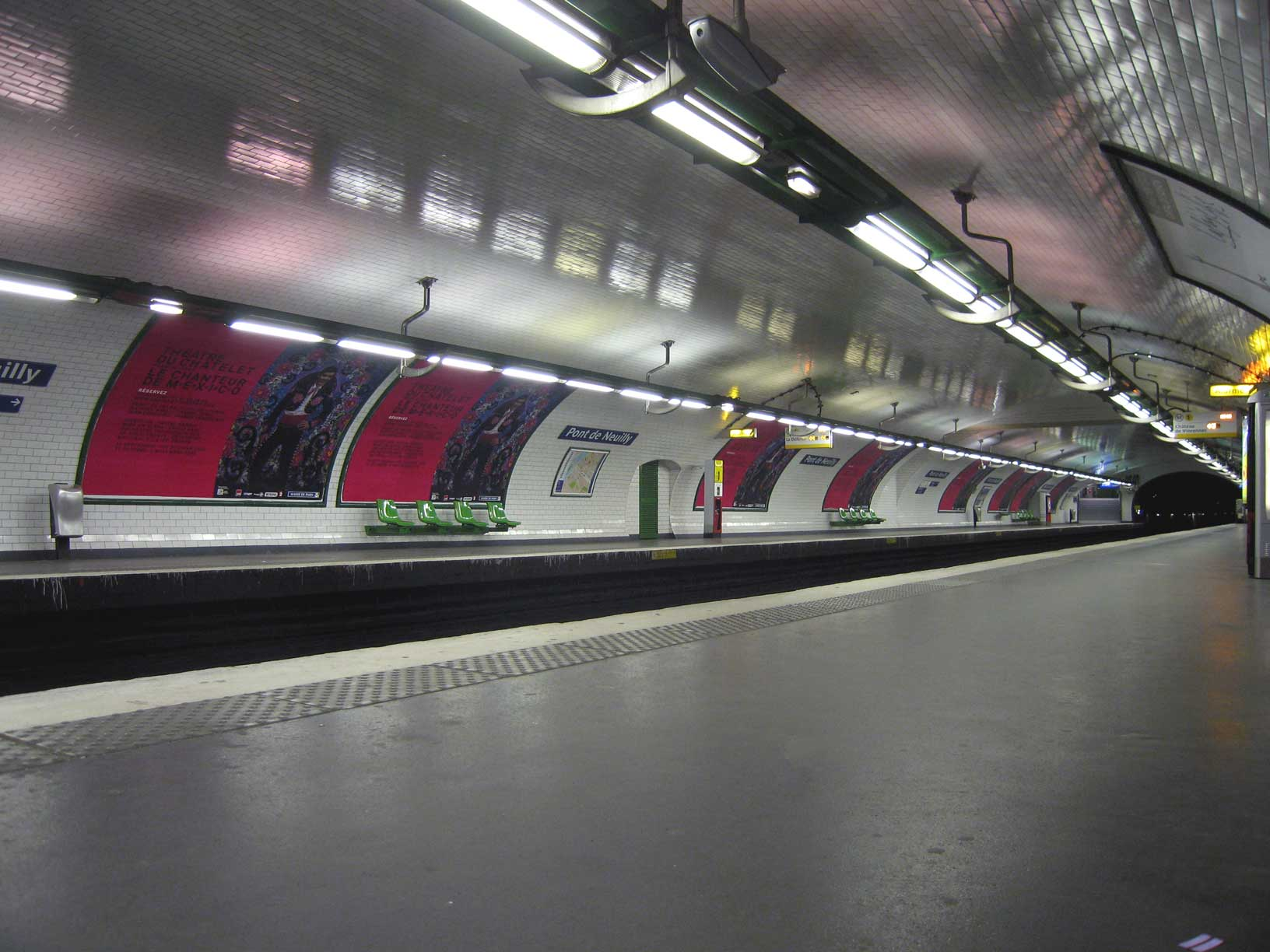
Pont de Neuilly

MP 89 at Pont de Neuilly

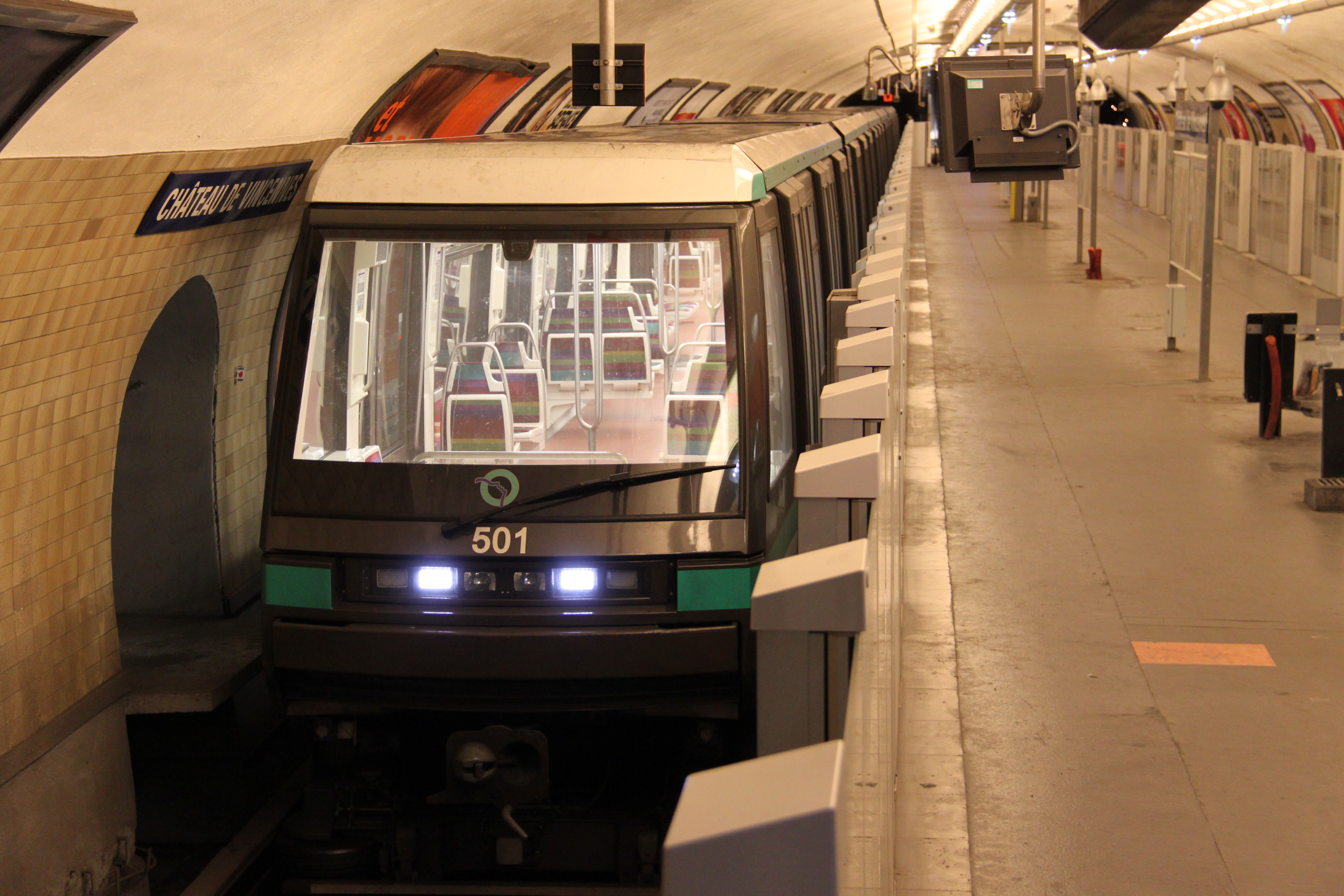
MP 05 at Château de Vincennes

MP 89 CC at Bastille

== See also ==
- Paris
- Transport in Paris
- List of Paris Métro stations
- List of RER stations
- List of metro systems
- Rail transport in France

== Bibliography ==
- Bordas, Claude; Gayda, Marc (1992). De Saint-Germain-en-Laye à Marne-la-Vallée (in French). Éditions de L'Ormet. ISBN 9782906575103.
- Collardey, Bernard (1999). Les trains de Banlieue (in French). Vol. II. La Vie du Rail et des Transports. ISBN 978-2902808762.
- Dumas, A. (2 March 1901). "Le métropolitain de Paris. Exploitation des lignes de service. Usine électrique de Bercy". Le Génie civil (in French). Vol. XXXVIII. pp. 277–293.
- Gasnault, François; Zuber, Henri, eds. (1997). Métro-Cité : le chemin de fer métropolitain à la conquête de Paris, 1871-1945 (in French). Paris: les musées de la ville de Paris. p. 191. ISBN 2-87900-374-1.
- Guerrand, Roger-Henri (1986). L'aventure du métropolitain (in French). Paris: Éditions La Découverte. p. 190. ISBN 978-2-7071-1642-0. OCLC 319765831.
- Jacobs, Gaston (2001). Le métro de Paris: un siècle de matériel roulant (in French). Paris: Vie du rail. p. 223. ISBN 978-2-902808-97-7. OCLC 422048868.
- Lamming, Clive (2001). Métro insolite: promenades curieuses, lignes oubliées, stations fantômes, métros imaginaires, rames en tous genres (in French). Parigramme. p. 173. ISBN 978-2-84096-190-1. OCLC 47743514.
- Robert, Jean (1983). Robert, Jean (ed.). Notre Métro (in French) (2 ed.). Paris. p. 511.
- Sirand-Pugnet, Bernard (1997). De la Grand-mère à Météor : 45 ans d'évolution de la technologie des voies au métro de Paris (in French). Boulogne: ID. p. 275. ISBN 978-2-912252-00-5. OCLC 42080501.
- Tricoire, Jean (1999a). Le métro de Paris: 1899-1911 : images de la construction (in French). Paris Arles: Paris-Musées RATP Diff. Actes sud. p. 215. ISBN 978-2-87900-481-5. OCLC 42933473.
- Tricoire, Jean (1999b). Un siècle de métro en 14 lignes. De Bienvenüe à Météor (in French). Éditions La Vie du Rail. p. 351. ISBN 978-2-902808-87-8. OCLC 42933803.
- Zuber, Henri; et al. (1996). Le patrimoine de la RATP (in French). Charenton-le-Pont: Flohic éditions. p. 400. ISBN 978-2-84234-007-0. OCLC 36719141.
