= Neuilly–Porte Maillot station =

Railway station in Paris

Neuilly–Porte Maillot Palais des Congrès
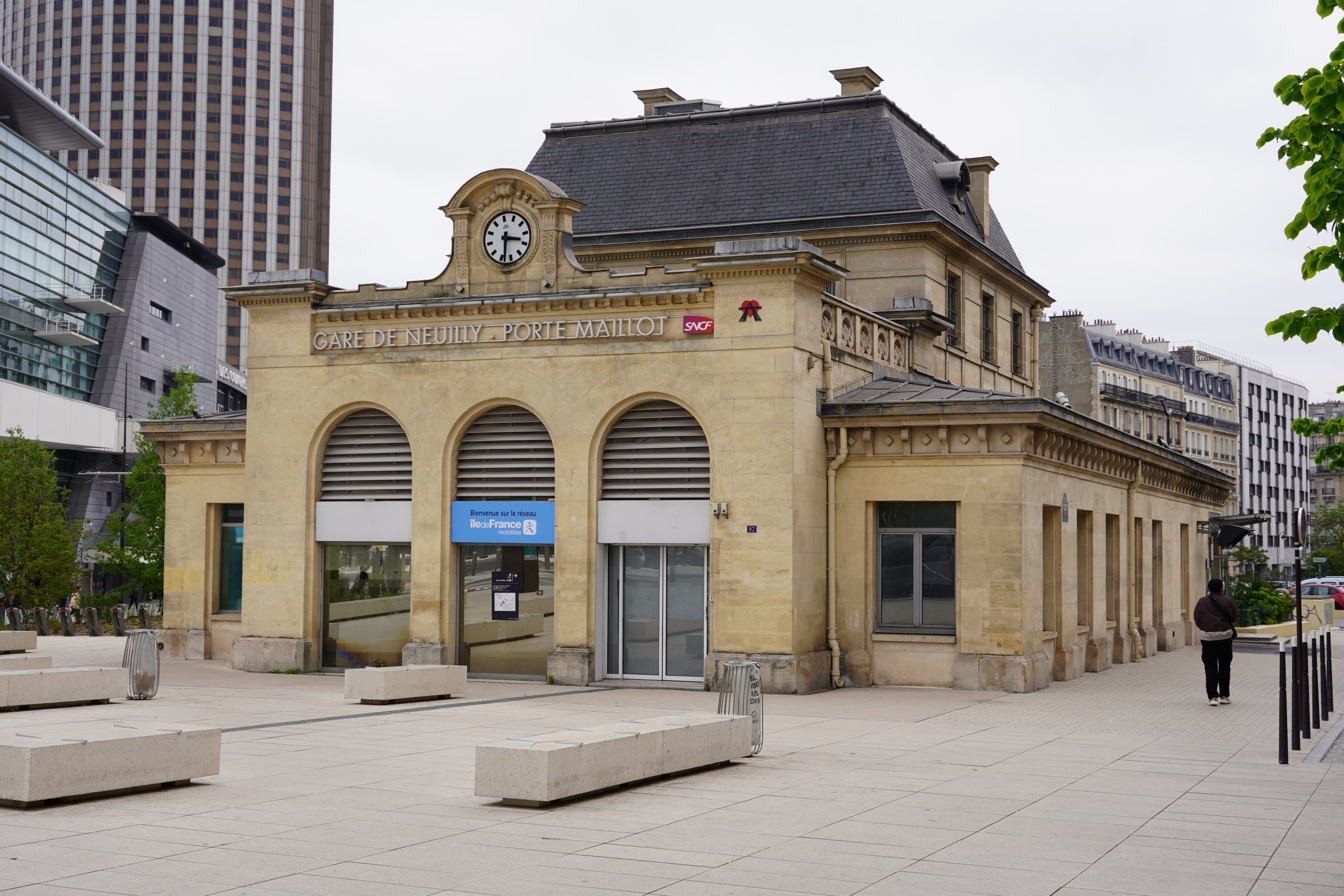
- Station building in May 2024

General information
- Location: France
- Coordinates: 48°52′40″N 2°17′3″E
- Operator: SNCF
- Platforms: 1 island platform (RER C); 2 platforms (RER E)
- Tracks: 4
- Connections: (Porte Maillot)

Construction
- Structure type: Underground
- Accessible: No

Other information
- Station code: 87381020
- Fare zone: 1

History
- Opened: 2 May 1854; 6 May 2024 (RER E)

Passengers
- 2024: 4,548,277

Services
| Preceding station | RER | Following station |
|---|---|---|
| Pereire–Levallois towards Pontoise | RER C | Avenue Foch towards Massy-Palaiseau or Dourdan-la-Forêt |
| La Défense towards Nanterre–La Folie | RER E | Haussmann–Saint-Lazare towards Chelles–Gournay or Tournan |
Location

Neuilly–Porte Maillot station (French pronunciation: [nœji pɔʁt majo]) is a station in Paris's express suburban rail system, the RER and is situated in the 17th arrondissement of Paris. It has been served by RER C since 1988 and also by RER E since its western extension opened on 6 May 2024. It is connected to Porte Maillot station on Paris Métro Line 1, as well as to a tram stop on tramway Line T3b. The station is close to the Palais des congrès de Paris, as indicated by the station's subtitle.

== Gallery ==
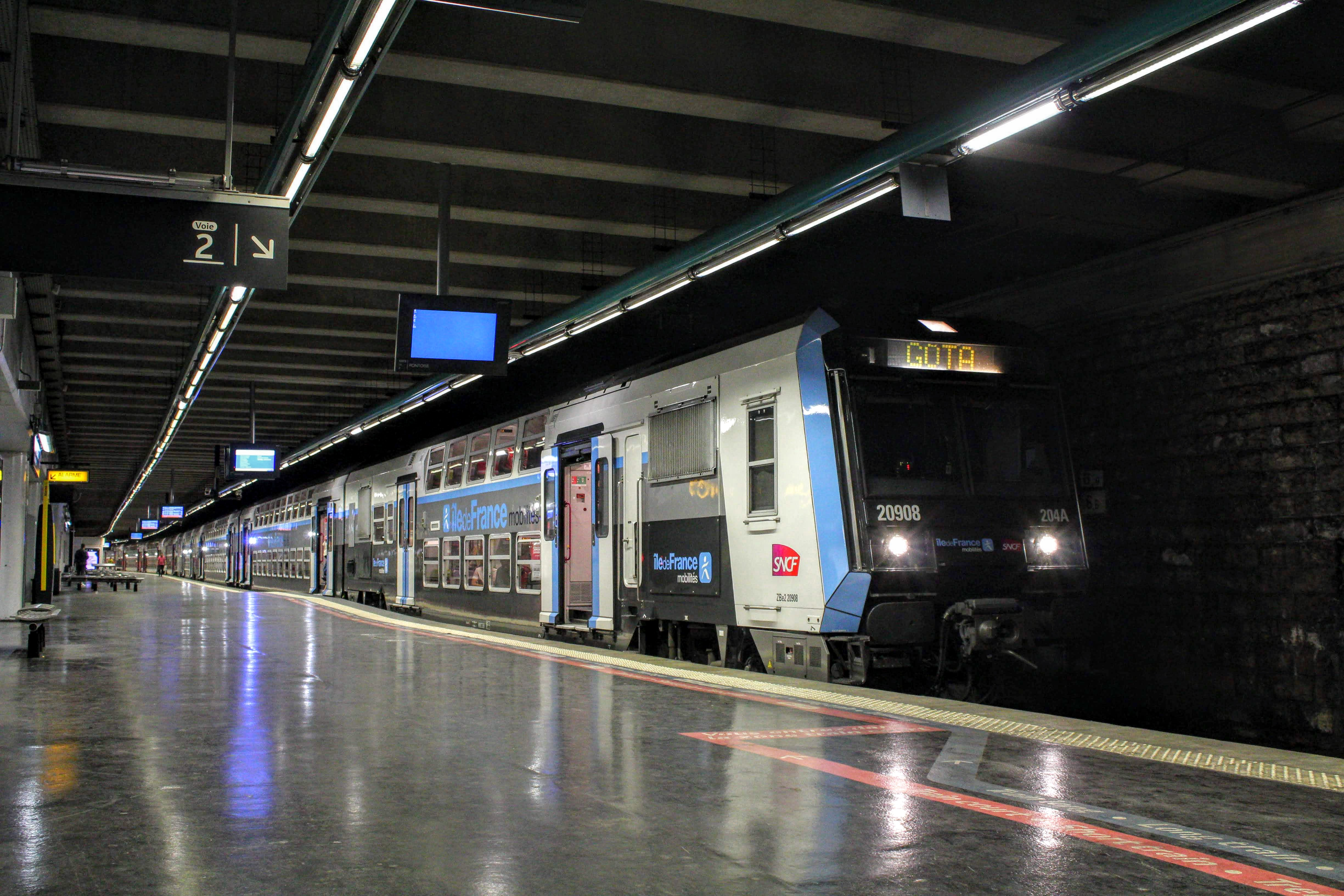
RER C platform

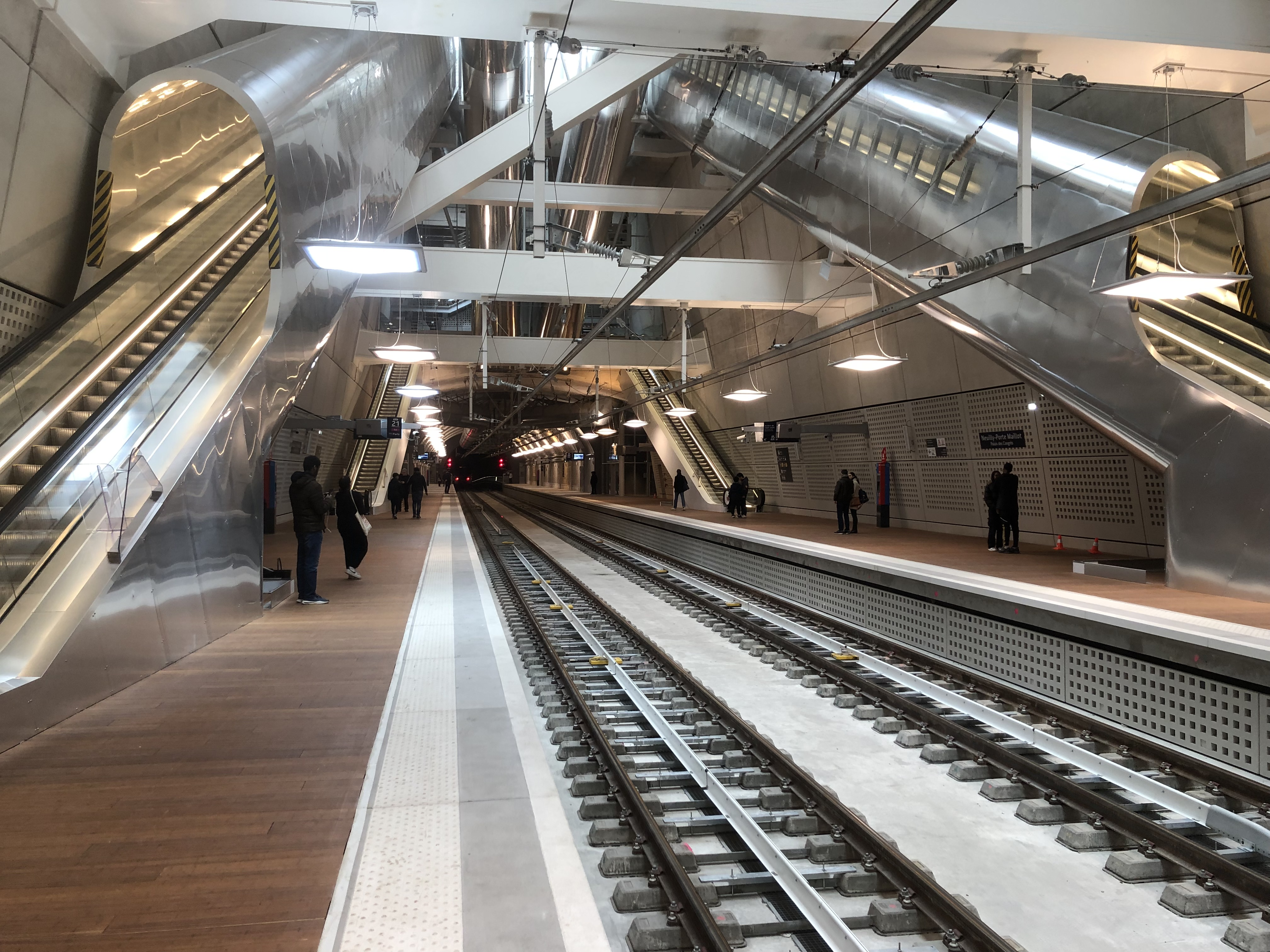
RER E platforms

== See also ==
- List of stations of the Paris RER
- List of stations of the Paris Métro
