= Palais des congrès de Paris =

Convention centre in Paris

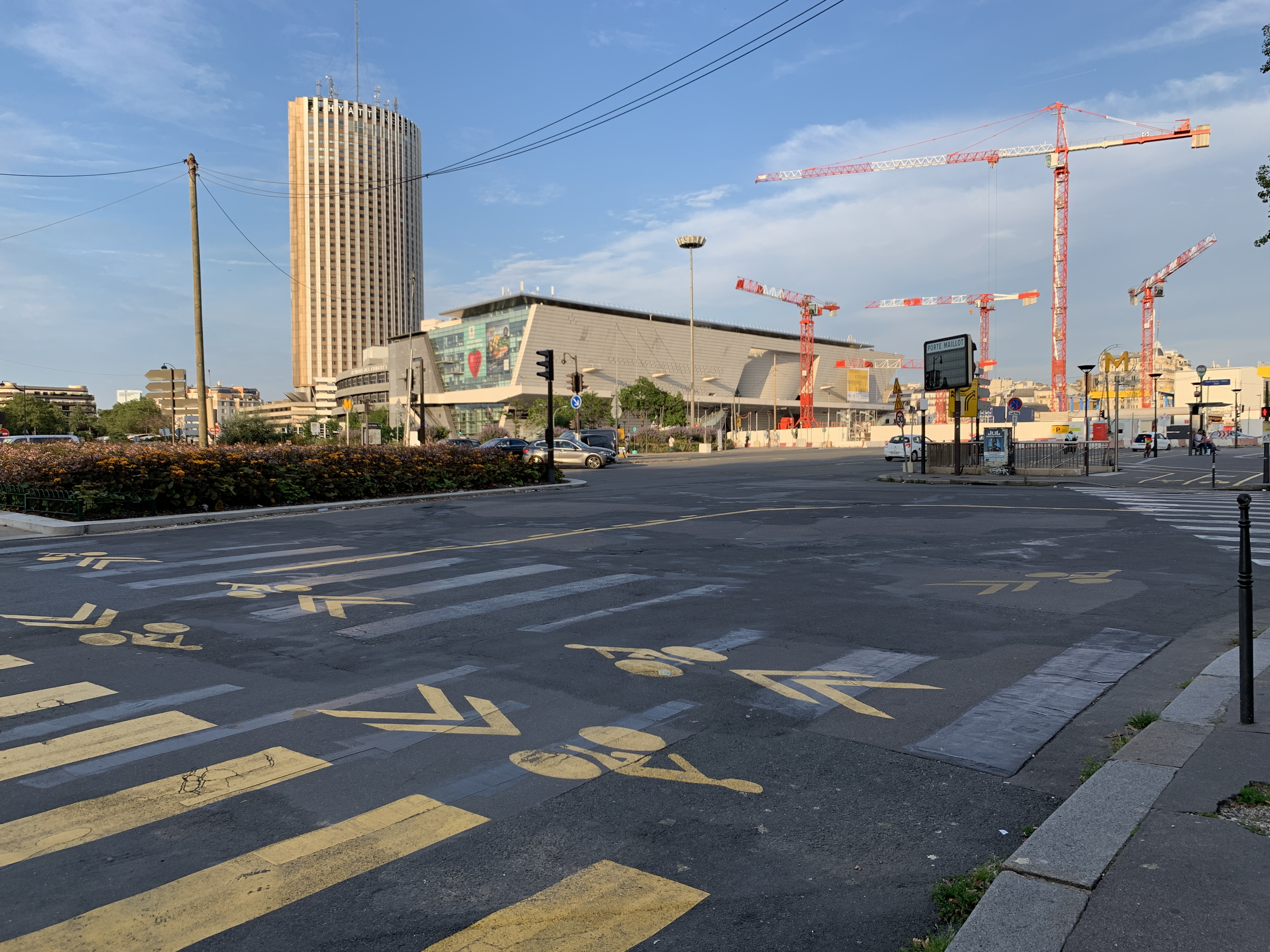
- Interactive map of Palais des congrès de Paris
- Location: Paris, France
- Coordinates: 48°52′44″N 02°17′00″E
- Operator: Viparis
- Capacity: Grand Amphithéâtre: 3,723 seats Amphithéâtre Bleu: 826 seats Amphithéâtre Bordeaux: 650 seats Amphithéâtre Havane: 373 seats
- Public transit: at Porte Maillot; at Neuilly–Porte Maillot

Construction
- Groundbreaking: 1970
- Opened: 28 February 1974
- Renovated: 1991 (Grand Amphithéâtre)
- Expanded: 1997–1999
- Architects: Guillaume Gillet; Serge Maloletenkov; Yves Betin; Henri Guibout; Christian de Portzamparc

The Palais des congrès de Paris (French pronunciation: [palɛ de kɔ̃ɡʁɛ də paʁi]; English: Paris Congress Centre) is a convention centre, concert venue, and shopping mall at the Porte Maillot in the 17th arrondissement of Paris, France. The venue was built by French architect Guillaume Gillet, and was inaugurated in 1974.

Nearby the venue are Bois de Boulogne and the affluent neighbourhood of Neuilly-sur-Seine. The closest métro and RER stations are Porte Maillot and Neuilly–Porte Maillot, accessible via the lower levels of the building.

== History ==
The land on which the convention center is located is on the edge of the Plaine des Sablons and Sablonville; it was previously occupied by bastion No. 51 on the Thiers wall, the Luna-Park and the Église Notre-Dame-de-Compassion de Paris.

After the destruction of the Thiers wall fortifications around 1920, this wasteland was used for the installation of temporary summer amusement parks. Even after the war, it housed a few government buildings. The construction of the Boulevard Périphérique, parallel to it caused a complete redevelopment of the Parisian area.

From 1970, on the site of the old Luna Park, the convention centre and the Hotel Concorde Lafayette located next door, were built. The small Notre-Dame-de-Compassion church there, built by Louis-Philippe in memory of his deceased son, was dismantled and then rebuilt stone by stone, a hundred meters further. Works were by architects Guillaume Gillet, Serge Maloletenkov, Yves Betin and Henri Guibout, with the buildings inaugurated on 28 February 1974.

An extension was carried out between 1997 and 1999. The imposing sloping facade, which dates from this rehabilitation, is the work of architect Christian de Portzamparc.

== Venues ==
With its 32,000 m^{2}, the convention centre has since 1999 four amphitheatres spread over four floors:

- the large Grand amphitheatre (3,723 seats) was renovated in 1991. The surface of the stage, 26 m by 22 m, and the technical installations make it possible to schedule company conventions during the day as well as opera or ballet shows in the evening.
- the Bleu (826 seats), Bordeaux (650 seats) and Havane (373 seats) amphitheatres which are smaller.
- two TV studios.

The palace also has numerous conference rooms and a two-level shopping arcade.

During the 1999 extension, the exhibition areas were doubled with three additional levels and two new flat halls. The new Bordeaux amphitheatre is built as an inverted cone, that is visible on the façade. It's a new architectural form set on an incline.

The convention centre is managed by the company Viparis.

== Hotel ==
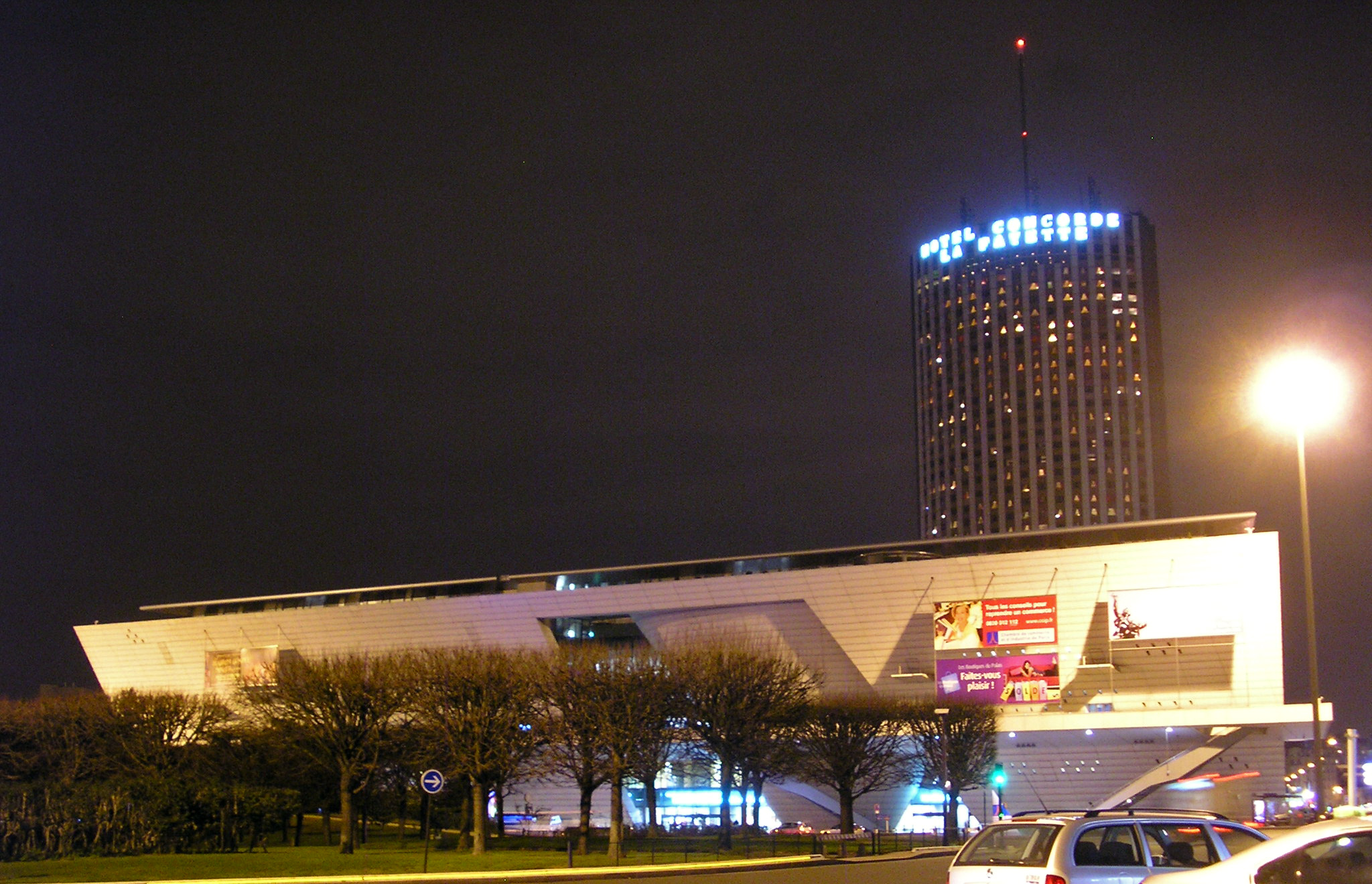
The hotel and Palais des Congrès at night (February 2007)

The Hyatt Regency Paris Étoile Hotel, located next door, with its 33 floors, 995 rooms and suites, and standing 137 m high (190 m with the antenna located on its roof), is one of the tallest buildings on the territory of the city of Paris after the Eiffel Tower and the Montparnasse tower, (but smaller than some of the buildings in the La Défense district located nearby). It was inaugurated in April 1974, as part of the creation of the Centre International de Paris.

== Past events ==
- César Awards presentations: 1976, 1981, 1986, 1987, 1988, 1992, 1995
- Eurovision Song Contest 1978
- Eurovision Young Dancers 1989
- Tour de France presentation
- UEFA Euro 2016 final draw

Preceded by Wembley Conference Centre; London	Eurovision Song Contest; Venue; 1978	Succeeded by International Convention Center; Jerusalem
