= Avenue Foch station =

Railway station in Paris, France

Avenue Foch
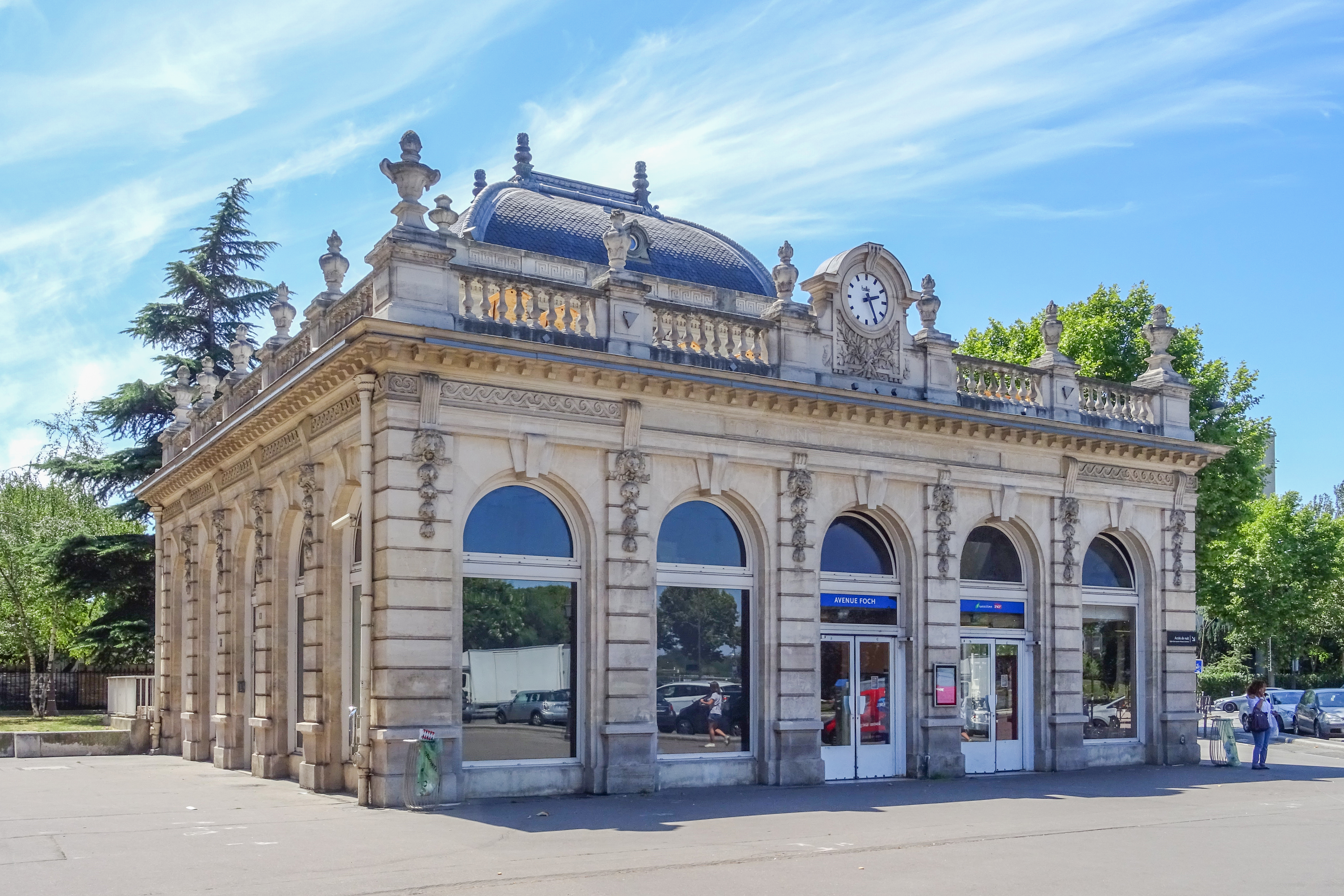
- Passenger building in 2017.

General information
- Location: 85 Avenue Foch; 16th arrondissement Paris; France
- Coordinates: 48°52′14″N 2°16′31″E
- Elevation: 40 m (130 ft)
- Owner: SNCF
- Operator: SNCF
- Line: RER C
- Platforms: 1 island platform
- Tracks: 2
- Bus routes: : PC
- Bus operators: RATP
Connections
Paris Metro	Line 2

Other information
- Station code: 87381038
- Fare zone: 1

History
- Opened: 1854
- Former names: Avenue du Bois de Boulogne

Passengers
- 2024: 1,192,103

Services
Preceding station	RER	Following station
Neuilly–Porte Maillot towards Pontoise	RER C	Avenue Henri Martin towards Massy-Palaiseau or Dourdan-la-Forêt
Location

Avenue Foch station (French pronunciation: [avny fɔʃ]) is a station in the Paris express suburban rail system, the RER. It is in the 16th arrondissement of Paris. It had previous been called Avenue du Bois de Boulogne as part of the Auteuil line, but was renamed following the change to the road itself. The station was once a "sunken" station, meaning that it was not covered.

== Adjacent station ==
- Porte Dauphine on Paris Métro Line 2 is within walking distance.

== Tourism ==
- Bois de Boulogne
- Musée de la Contrefaçon

== See also ==
- List of stations of the Paris RER
- List of stations of the Paris Métro
