= M1 (Paris Metro) =

Paris Metro train, 1900–1931

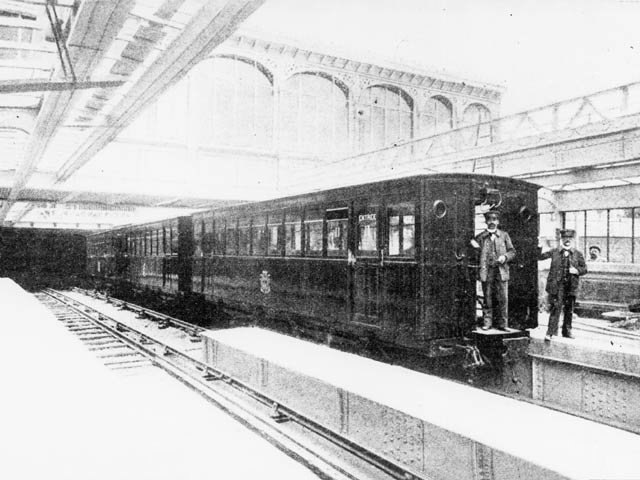
A M1 train at Bastille, 1900

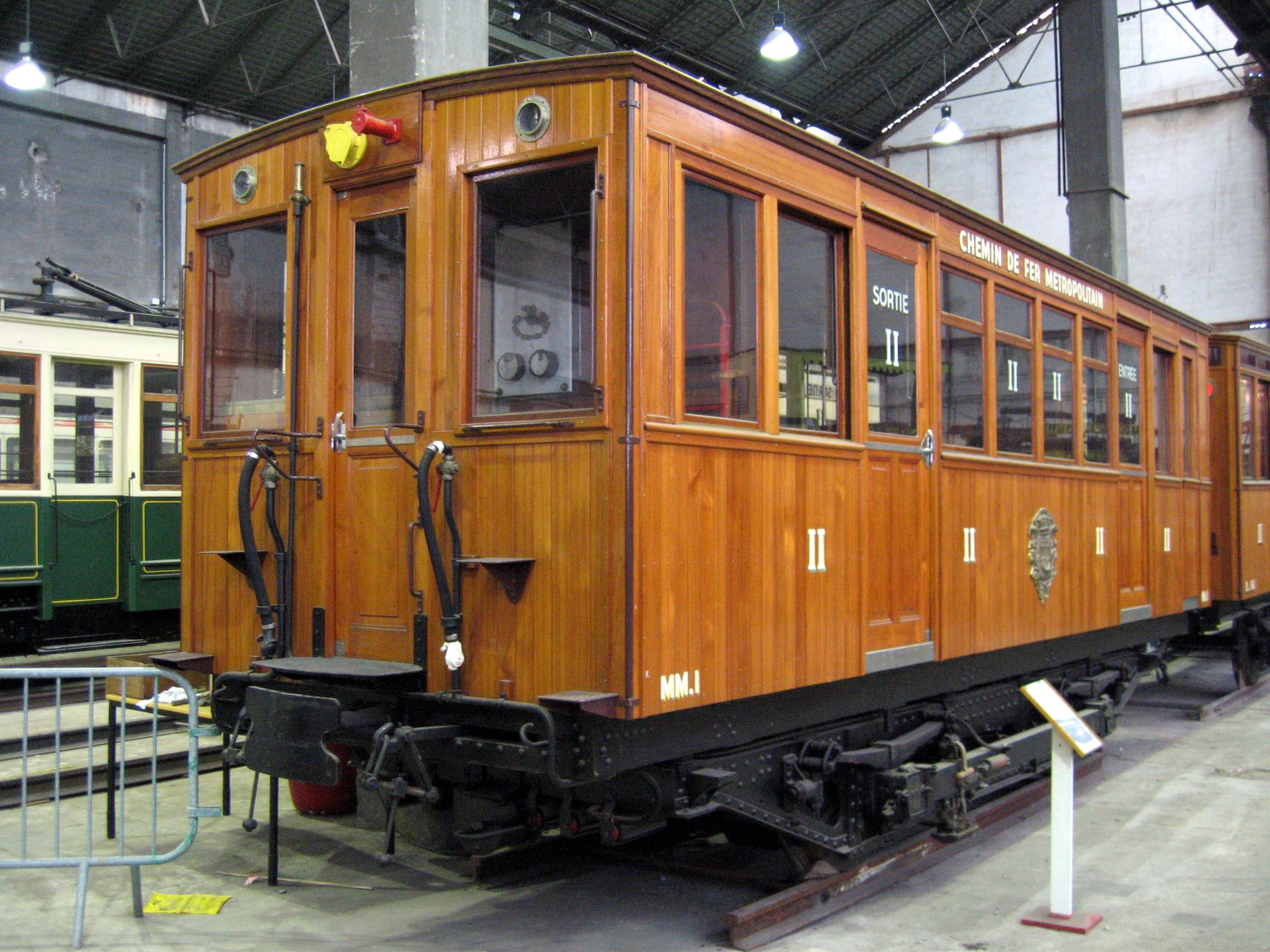
A preserved MM1 car at the Musée des transports urbains, September 2007

The M1 and MM1 trainsets, and the cars of the same type, constituted the first rolling stock on the Paris Metro. They began service in 1900 and were constructed of wood.

== Original trainsets ==
The original trains consisted of short cars (8 m or 26 ft 3 in long) with two axles equipped with a Thomson or a Westinghouse traction motor that did not permit them to work in multiple units. As a result, a trainset had four cars and each train stopped at only about half of the stations.

== Trainsets with two sets of controls ==
Trainsets with two sets of controls existed on lines 2 and 6, put in service near the end of 1900. Upon arriving at a terminus, the reversible trainsets would change direction as was common among trams of the time.

== The thomson-double ==
In 1901 and 1902, the new 100 and 200 series were equipped with the Thomson-Double system which permitted two trainsets to work in multiple units (thus creating eight-car trains). This proved to be inconvenient as the system functioned entirely on high voltage (600 V DC) and the power of the motors were still barely sufficient. In case of a malfunction, the replacement of a damaged train was also problematic.

These defects came to light during the Paris Metro train fire on 10 August 1903, which resulted in the death of 84 people who were asphyxiated by smoke. Twelve cars were destroyed. This incident directly led to the withdrawal of M1 and MM1 trains on lines 2, 5 and 6 after 1914, with their eventual retirement on all lines after 1931.

== Preserved units ==
Trailer car B161 and two M1 motor cars (MM1 and A1) are preserved at the Musée des transports urbains.

== See also ==
- Motorcar
