= Saint-Mandé station =

Metro station in Saint-Mandé and Vincennes, France

Saint-Mandé
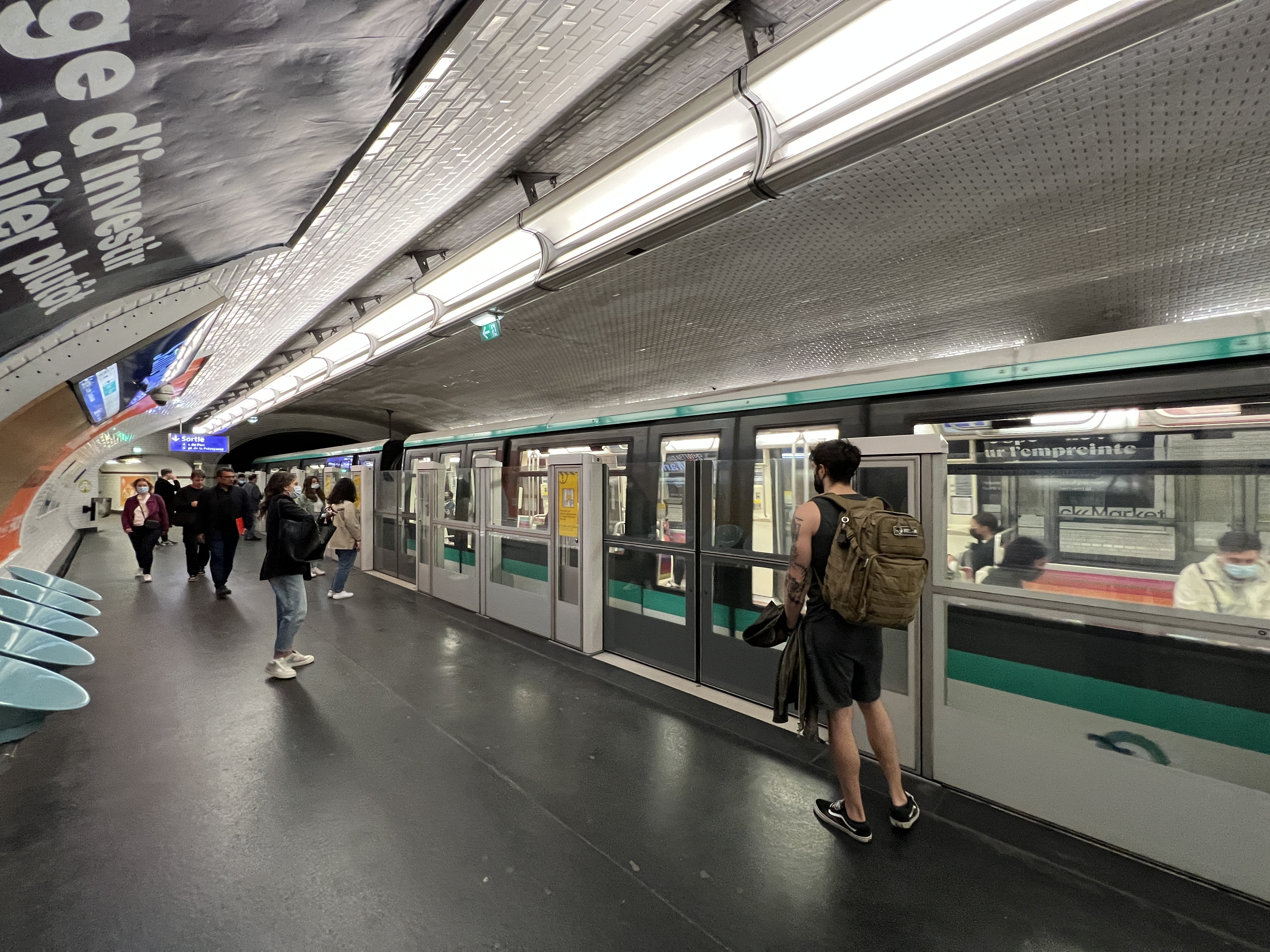
- MP 05 at Saint-Mandé

General information
- Location: 68 bis, av. de Paris; 113, av. de Paris; 125 bis, av. de Paris; 127, av. Gallieni; 180, av. Gallieni; Saint-Mandé; Île-de-France; France
- Coordinates: 48°50′46″N 2°25′08″E
- Owner: RATP
- Operator: RATP
- Line: Paris Metro Paris Metro Line 1
- Platforms: 2 (side platforms)
- Tracks: 2
- Connections: RATP Bus: 86 325; Noctilien: N11

Construction
- Accessible: no

Other information
- Station code: 25-08
- Fare zone: 2

History
- Opened: 24 March 1934; 92 years ago
- Former names: Tourelle (24 March 1934 – 25 April 1937); Saint-Mandé – Tourelle (26 April 1937 – 25 July 2002)

Passengers
- 3,944,640 (2021)

Services
Preceding station	Paris Metro	Following station
Porte de Vincennes towards La Défense	Line 1	Bérault towards Château de Vincennes
Route map
Location
- Location within Paris

Saint-Mandé ([sɛ̃ mɑ̃de]) is a station on Line 1 of the Paris Métro, situated on the border of the suburban communes of Saint-Mandé and Vincennes, just outside the Boulevard Périphérique.

== History ==
The station opened as Tourelle on 24 March 1934 as part of the line's extension from Porte de Vincennes to Château de Vincennes, named after the former historial defense towers of the Château de Vincennes. It was the third extension of the métro outside of the administrative limits of the capital, after the extension of line 9 to Pont de Sèvres and that of line 12 to Mairie d'Issy, the latter being inaugurated on the same date.

On 26 April 1937, the station was renamed Saint-Mandé – Tourelle, to emphasise its location in the commune of Saint-Mandé. To avoid any confusion, the existing Saint-Mandé on line 6 was renamed Picpus on 1 March 1937.

In the 1960s, the platform walls were covered with a yellow metal panelling and illuminated golden advertising frames.

As part of the "Un métro + beau" programme by the RATP, the station's corridors were renovated and modernised on 26 July 2002. The station was also renamed Saint-Mandé on the same day, as it remains today. It is one of 3 stations on the métro to bear only the name of the commune they are situated in, the others being Le Kremlin-Bicêtre on line 7 and Saint-Ouen on line 14.

During the automation of line 1, the station had undergone a series of upgrades. The metal panelling installed since the 1960s was removed and the station's platform walls were retiled. Its platforms were closed from 17 to 18 May 2008 to reenforce and raise the platform level for the installation of platform screen doors, which were installed in May 2010. The line was fully automated in December 2012.

In 2019, the station was used by 6,245,865 passengers, making it the 57th busiest of the Métro network out of 302 stations.

In 2020, the station was used by 3,487,584 passengers amidst the COVID-19 pandemic, making it the 42nd busiest of the Métro network out of 304 stations.

In 2021, the station was used by 3,944,640 passengers, making it the 58th busiest of the Métro network out of 304 stations.

== Passenger services ==
=== Access ===
The station has 5 accesses:

- Access 1: avenue Joffre
- Access 2: avenue du Général de Gaulle
- Access 3: avenue Foch (exit-only escalator from the platform towards Chateau de Vincennes)
- Access 4: rue du Parc
- Access 5: Place de la Prévoyance (this is the only access located in the commune of Vincennes, hence, along with Saint-Ouen, are the only 2 stations to bear the name of a single commune while having an access in a neighbouring commune)

=== Station layout ===
G	Street Level	Exits/Entrances
M	Mezzanine	Connecting level, to Exits/Entrances
Platform level	Side platform with PSDs, doors will open on the right
Platform level	Westbound	← toward La Défense – Grande Arche (Porte de Vincennes)
Platform level	Eastbound	toward Château de Vincennes (Bérault) →
Platform level	Side platform with PSDs, doors will open on the right

=== Platforms ===
The station has a standard configuration with two tracks surrounded by two side platforms, with platform screen doors installed since May 2010.

=== Other connections ===
The station is also served by lines 86 and 325 of the RATP bus network, and at night, by line N11 of the Noctilien bus network.

== Nearby ==
- Bégin Military Teaching Hospital
- Bois de Vincennes
- Institut national de l'information géographique et forestière
- Lac de Saint-Mandé
- Ville de Saint Mandé

== Gallery ==
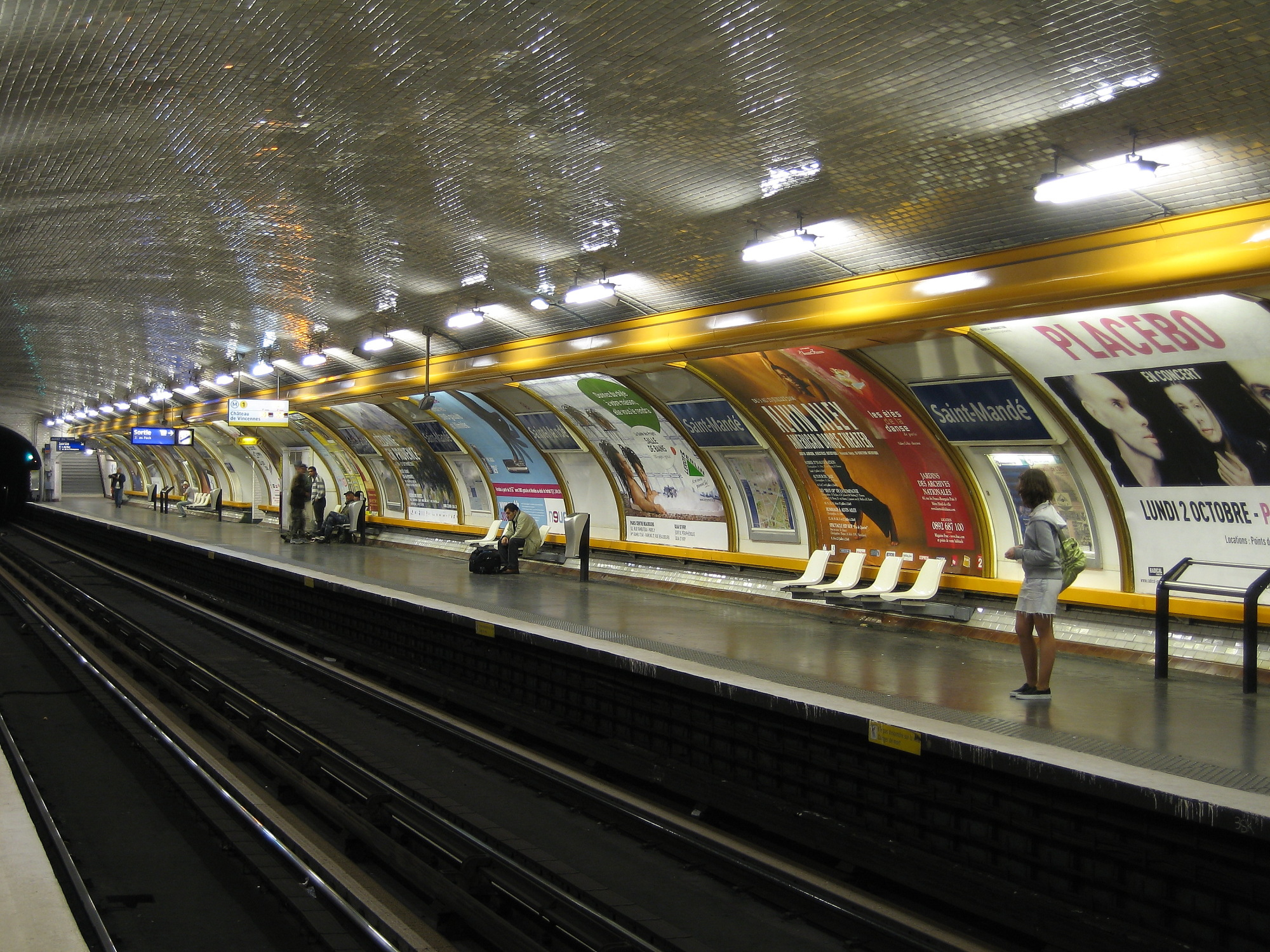
The station prior to the installation of platform screen doors

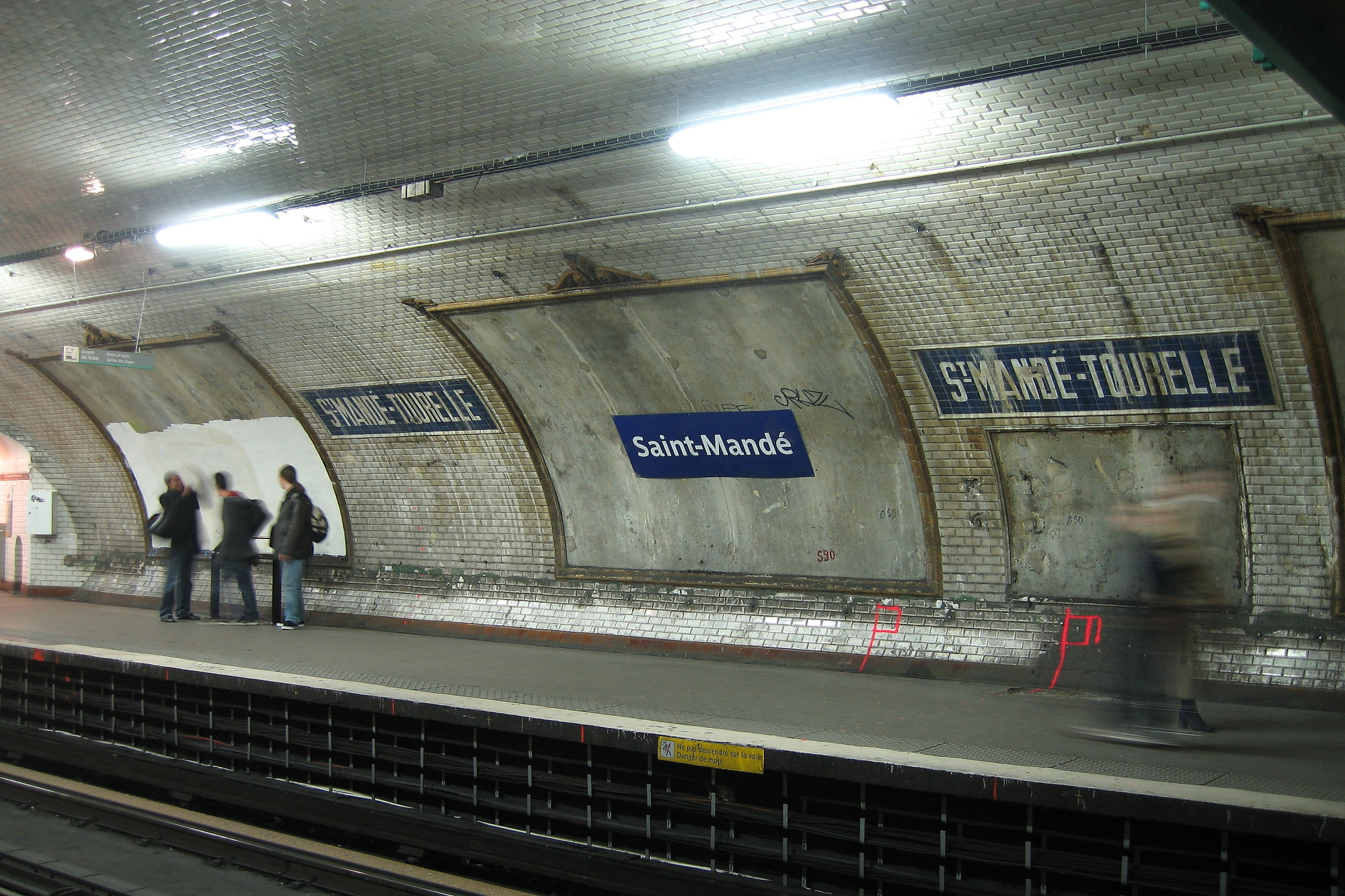
The station's original tiling revealed following the removal of the metal panelling in 2008

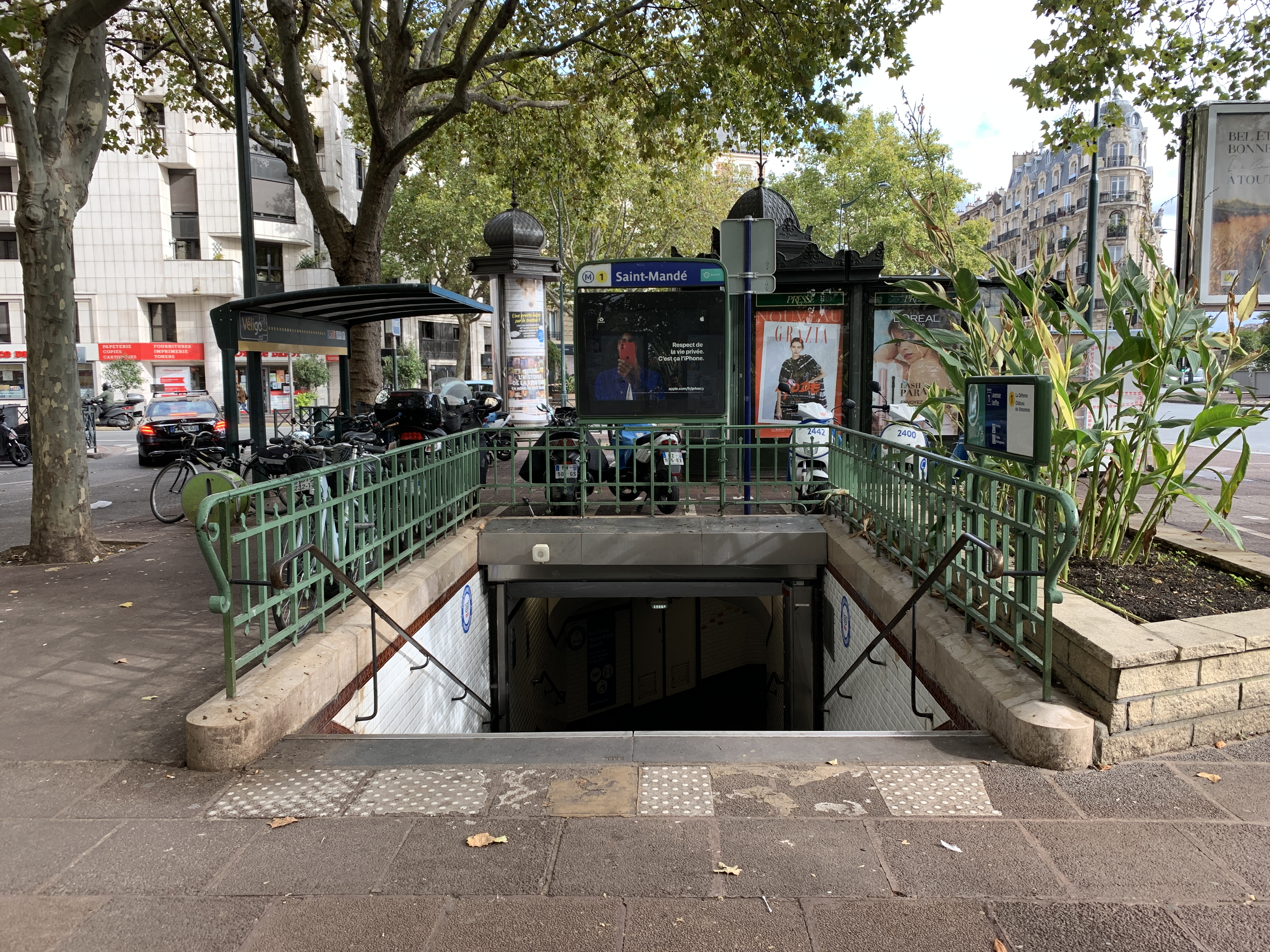
Access 1

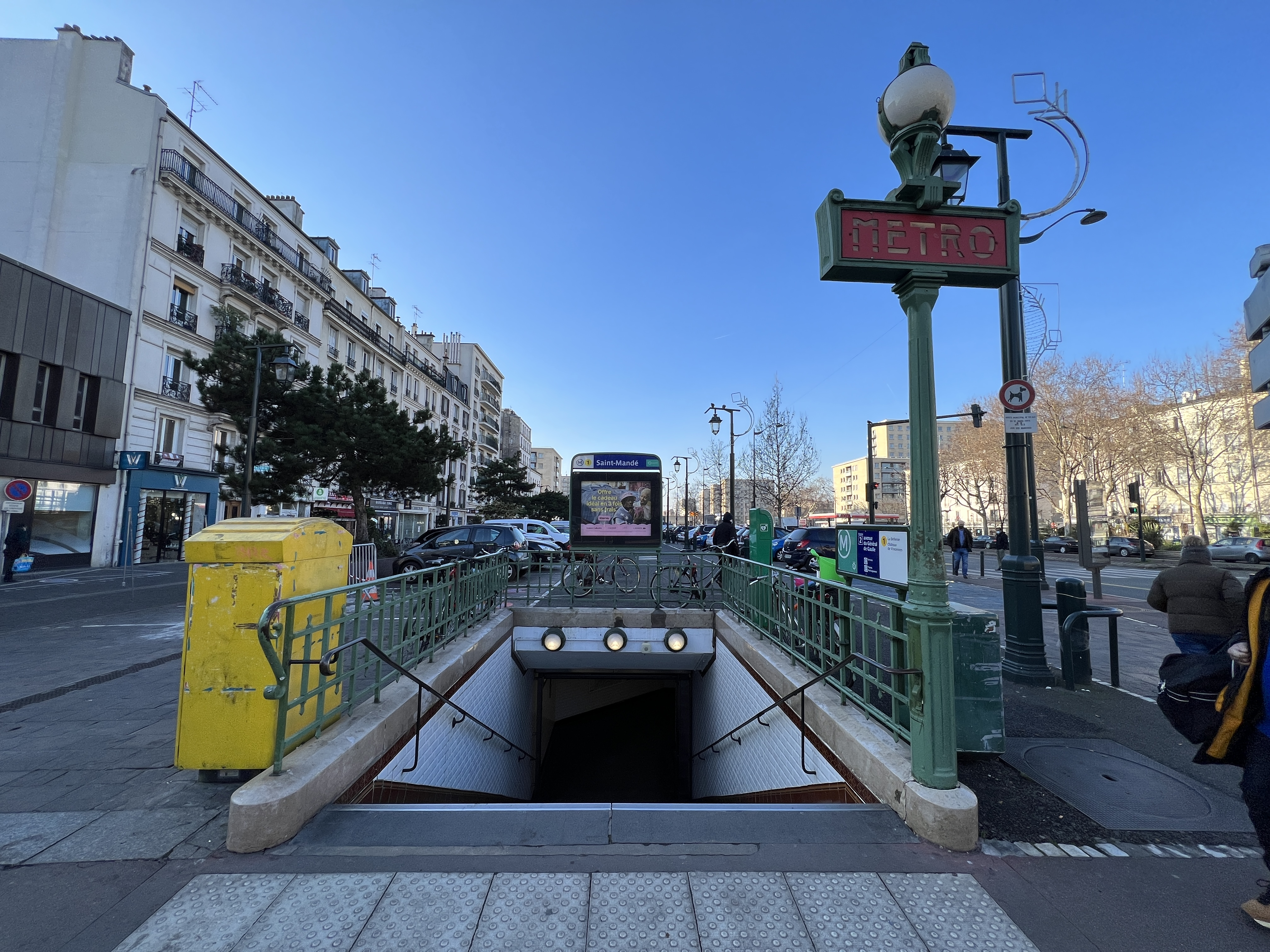
Access 2

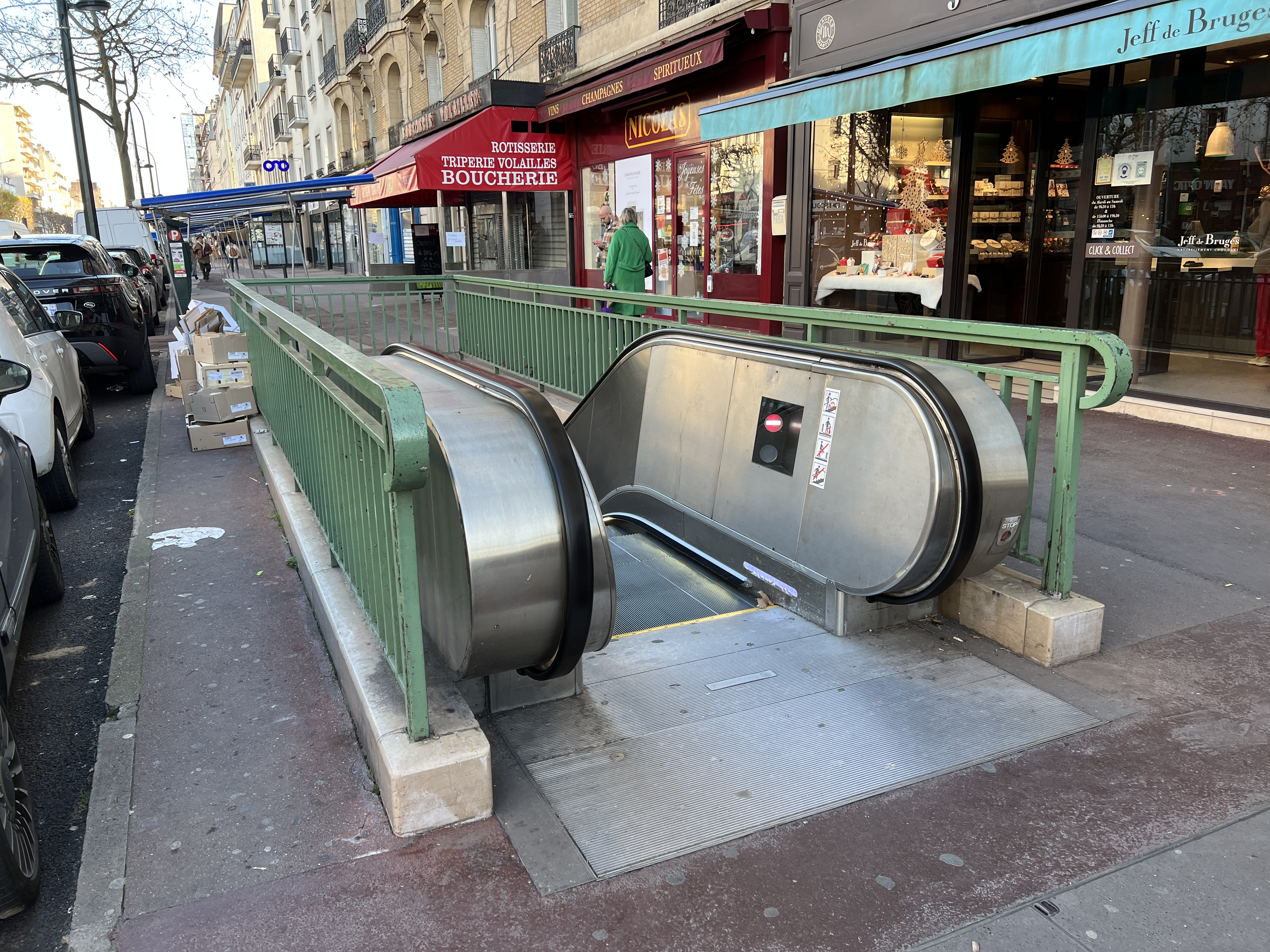
Access 3

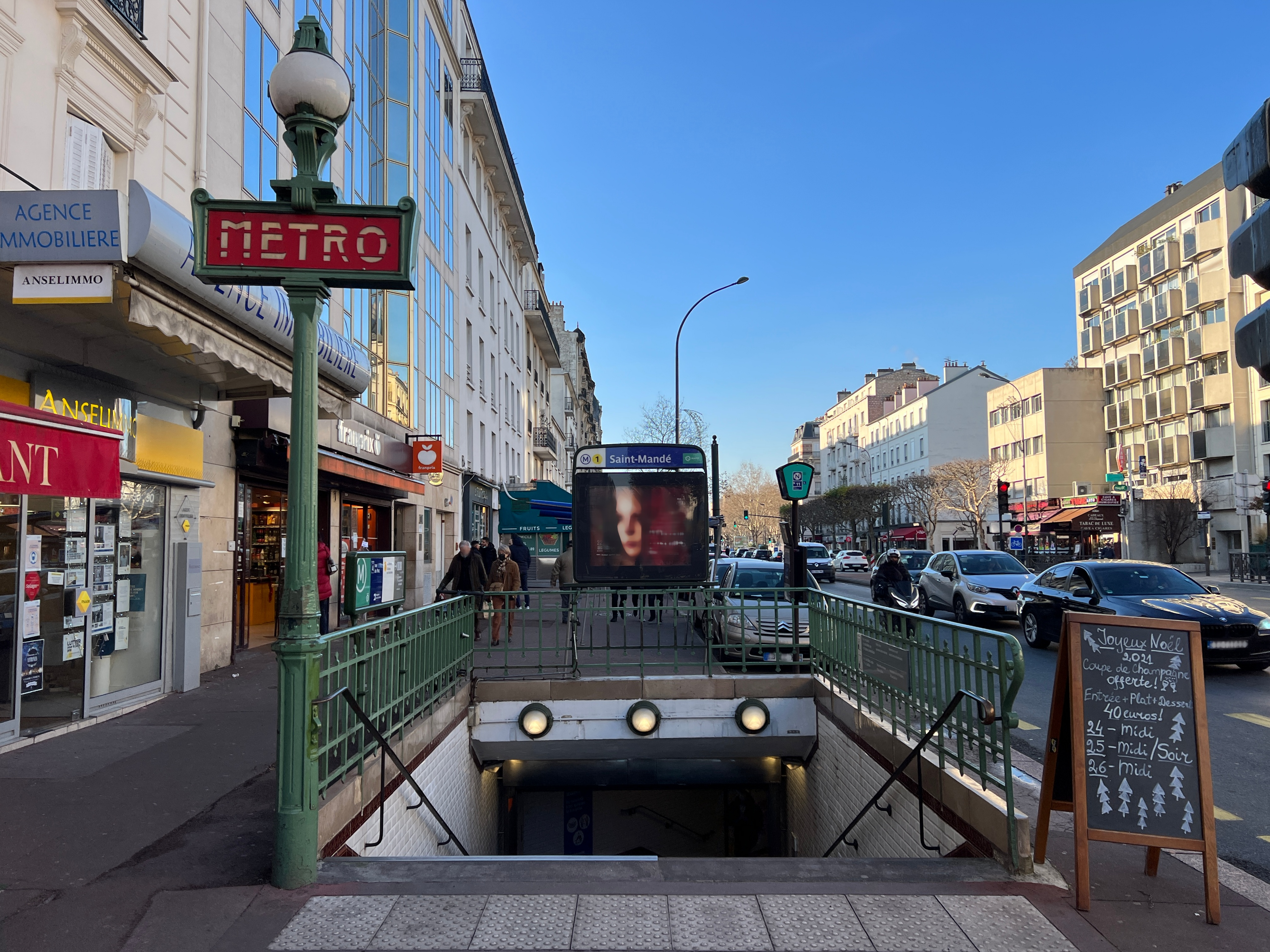
Access 4

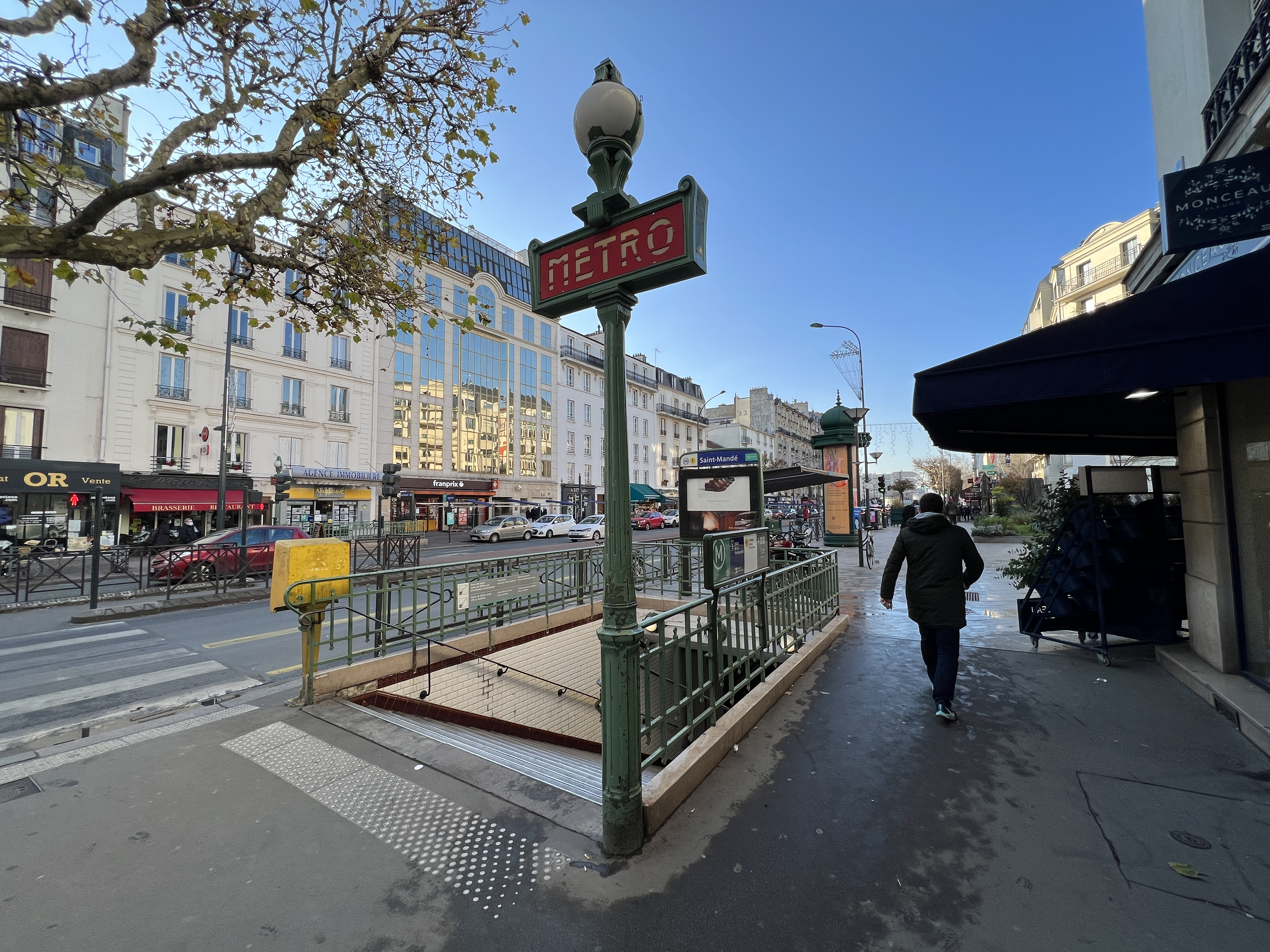
Access 5

== See also ==
- List of stations of the Paris Métro
