= Bérault station =

Metro station in Saint-Mandé and Vincennes, France

Bérault
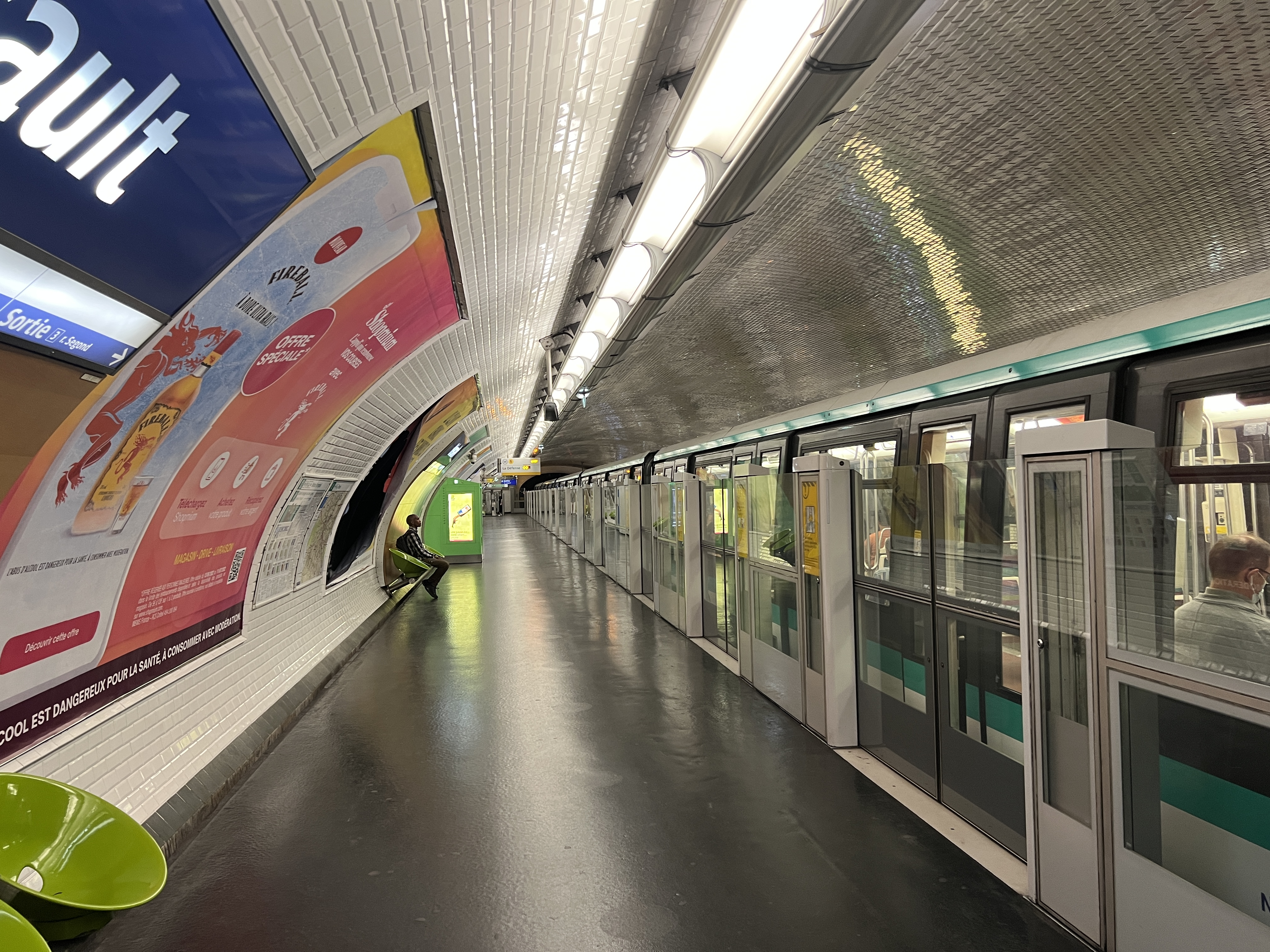
- Platforms in 2022

General information
- Location: Île-de-France; France
- Coordinates: 48°50′43″N 2°25′42″E
- Owner: RATP
- Operator: RATP
- Line: Paris Metro Paris Metro Line 1
- Platforms: 2 (side platforms)
- Tracks: 2
- Connections: RATP Bus: 56 215 325; Noctilien: N11 N33

Construction
- Accessible: no

Other information
- Station code: 25-10
- Fare zone: 2

History
- Opened: 24 March 1934; 92 years ago

Passengers
- 2,106,827 (2021)

Services
Preceding station	Paris Metro	Following station
Saint-Mandé towards La Défense	Line 1	Château de Vincennes Terminus
Route map
Location
- Location within Paris

Bérault ([beʁo]) is a station on Line 1 of the Paris Métro, situated on the border of the suburban communes of Saint-Mandé and Vincennes.

It is named after the nearby Place Bérault, which honours Michel Bérault (1796–1871), a former deputy mayor of Vincennes. It also evokes the name of Bérault Stuart d'Aubigny, a captain of the guard at the Château de Vincennes c. 1500.

== History ==
The station opened on 24 March 1934 as part of the line's extension from Porte de Vincennes to Château de Vincennes.

As part of the "Un métro + beau" programme by the RATP, the station's corridors were renovated and modernised in 13 December 2001.

During the automation of line 1, the station had undergone a series of upgrades. Its platforms were raised for the installation of platform screen doors on 28 and 29 July 2008, with the doors installed in early 2009. The line was fully automated in December 2012.

In 2019, the station was used by 3,656,859 passengers, making it the 133rd busiest of the Métro network out of 302 stations.

In 2020, the station was used by 2,112,213 passengers amidst the COVID-19 pandemic, making it the 114th busiest of the Métro network out of 304 stations.

In 2021, the station was used by 2,106,827 passengers, making it the 169th busiest of the Métro network out of 304 stations.

== Passenger services ==
=== Access ===
The station has 4 accesses:

- Access 1: Hôpital Bégin
- Access 2: Place Bérault
- Access 3: rue Segond
- Access 4: rue des Vignerons (with an ascending escalator)

=== Station layout ===
G	Street Level	Exits/Entrances
M	Mezzanine	Connecting level, to Exits/Entrances
Platform level	Side platform with PSDs, doors will open on the right
Platform level	Westbound	← toward La Défense – Grande Arche (Saint-Mandé)
Platform level	Eastbound	toward Château de Vincennes (Terminus) →
Platform level	Side platform with PSDs, doors will open on the right

=== Platforms ===
The station has a standard configuration with two tracks surrounded by two side platforms, with platform screen doors installed since early 2009.

=== Other connections ===
The station is also served by lines 56, and 325 of the RATP bus network, and at night, by line N11 and N33 of the Noctilien bus network.

Vincennes on RER A is located 500 metres away by foot.

== Gallery ==
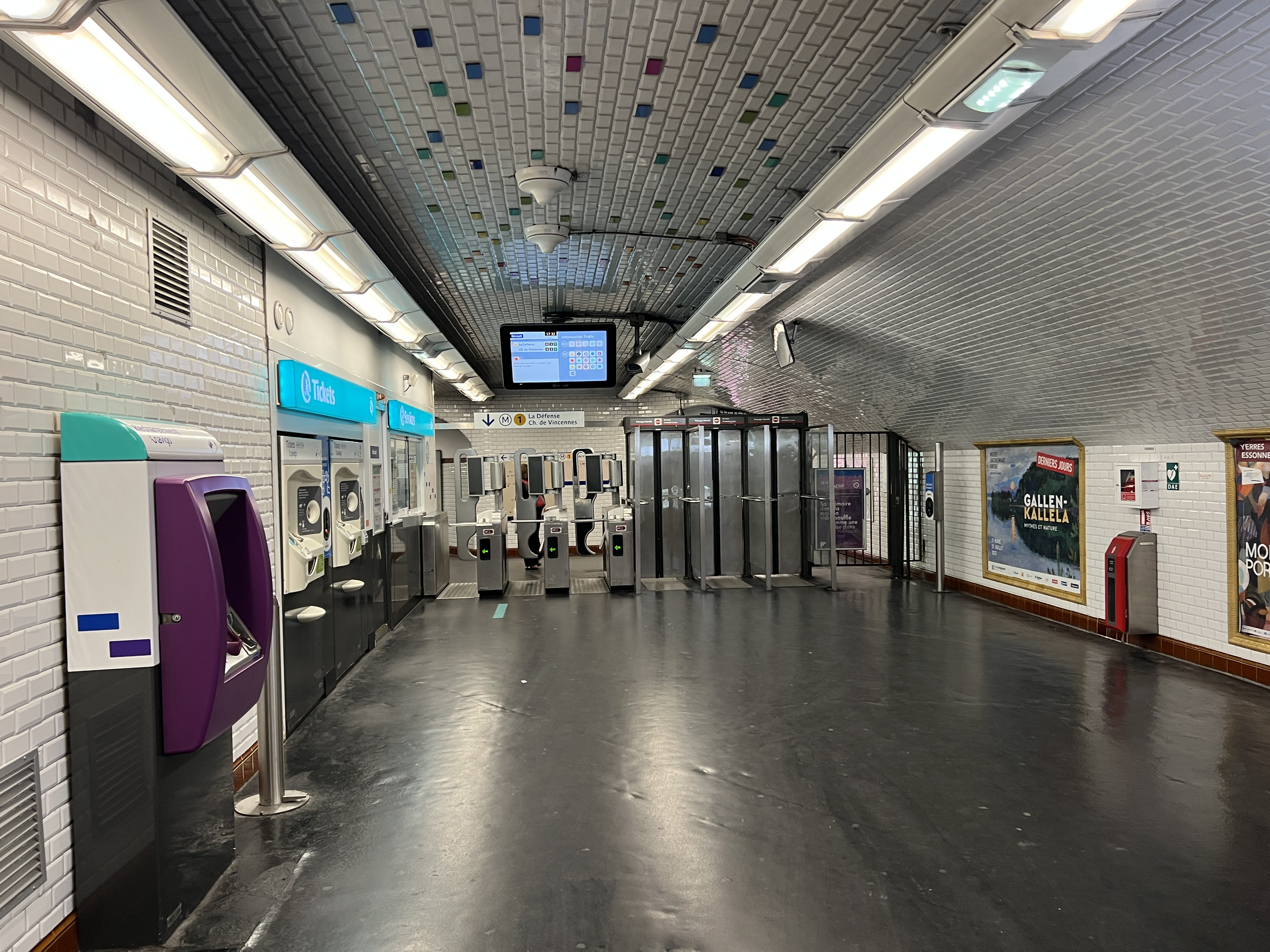
Mezzanine

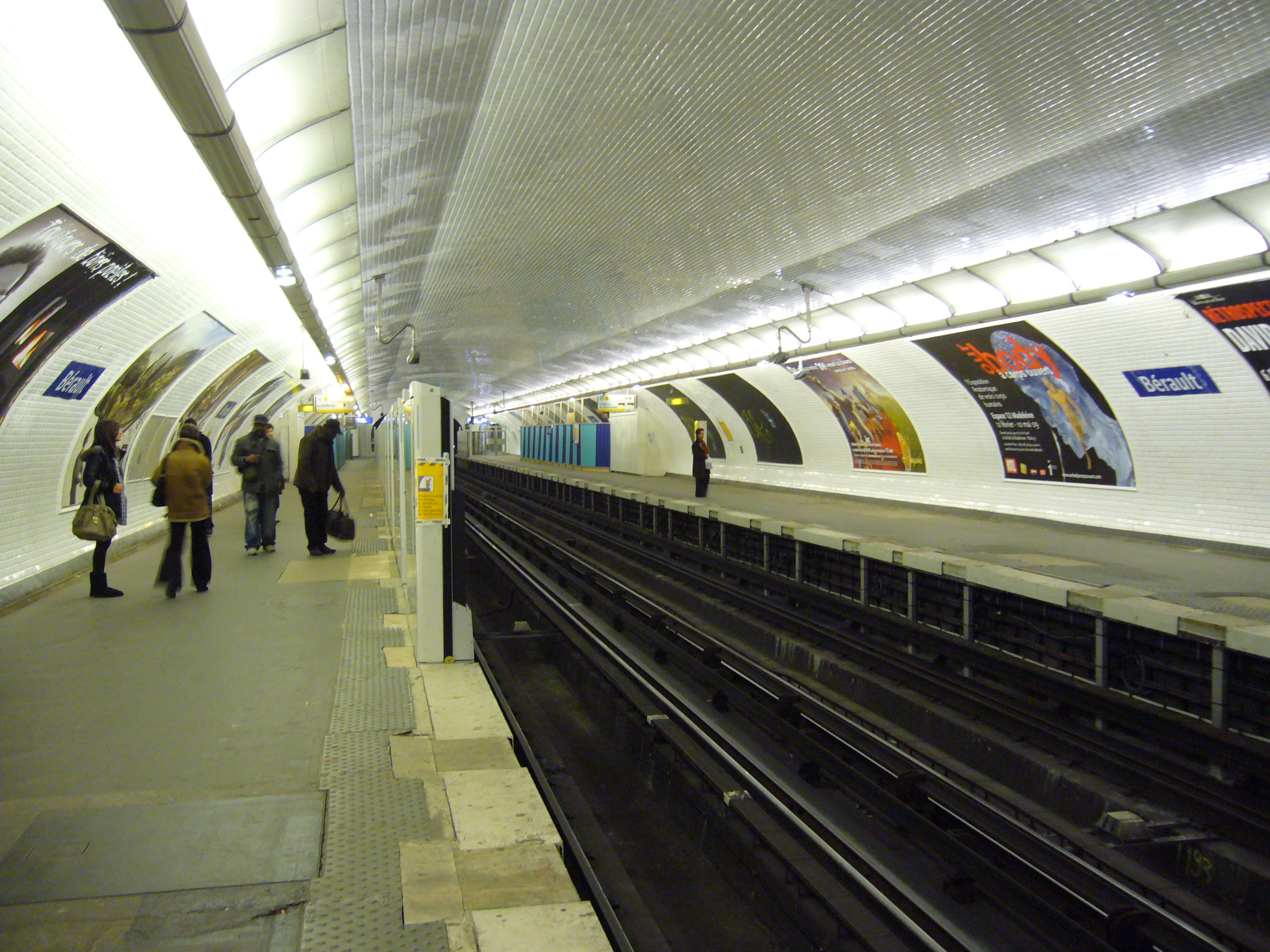
Installation of the platform screen doors in 2009

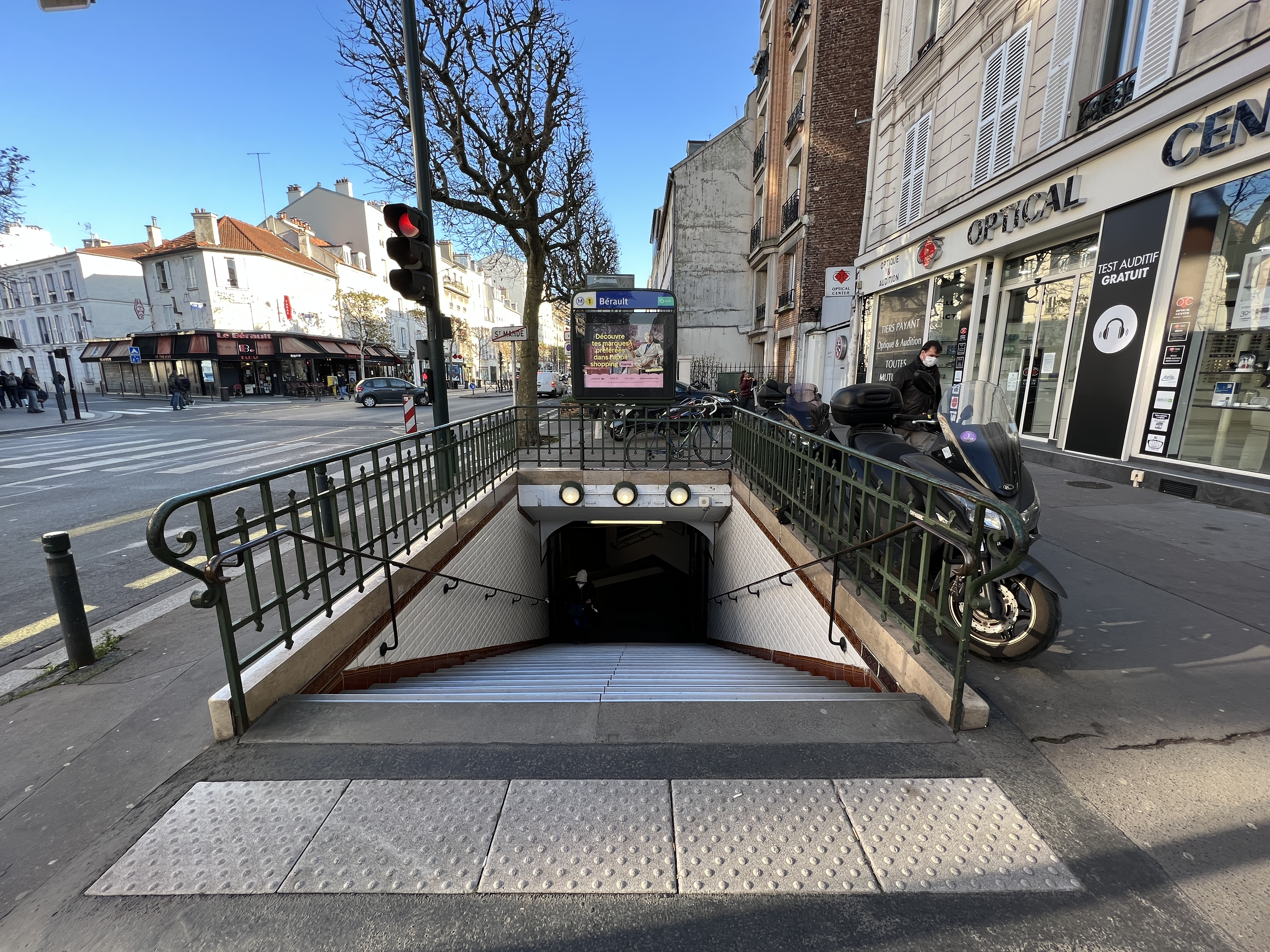
Access 1

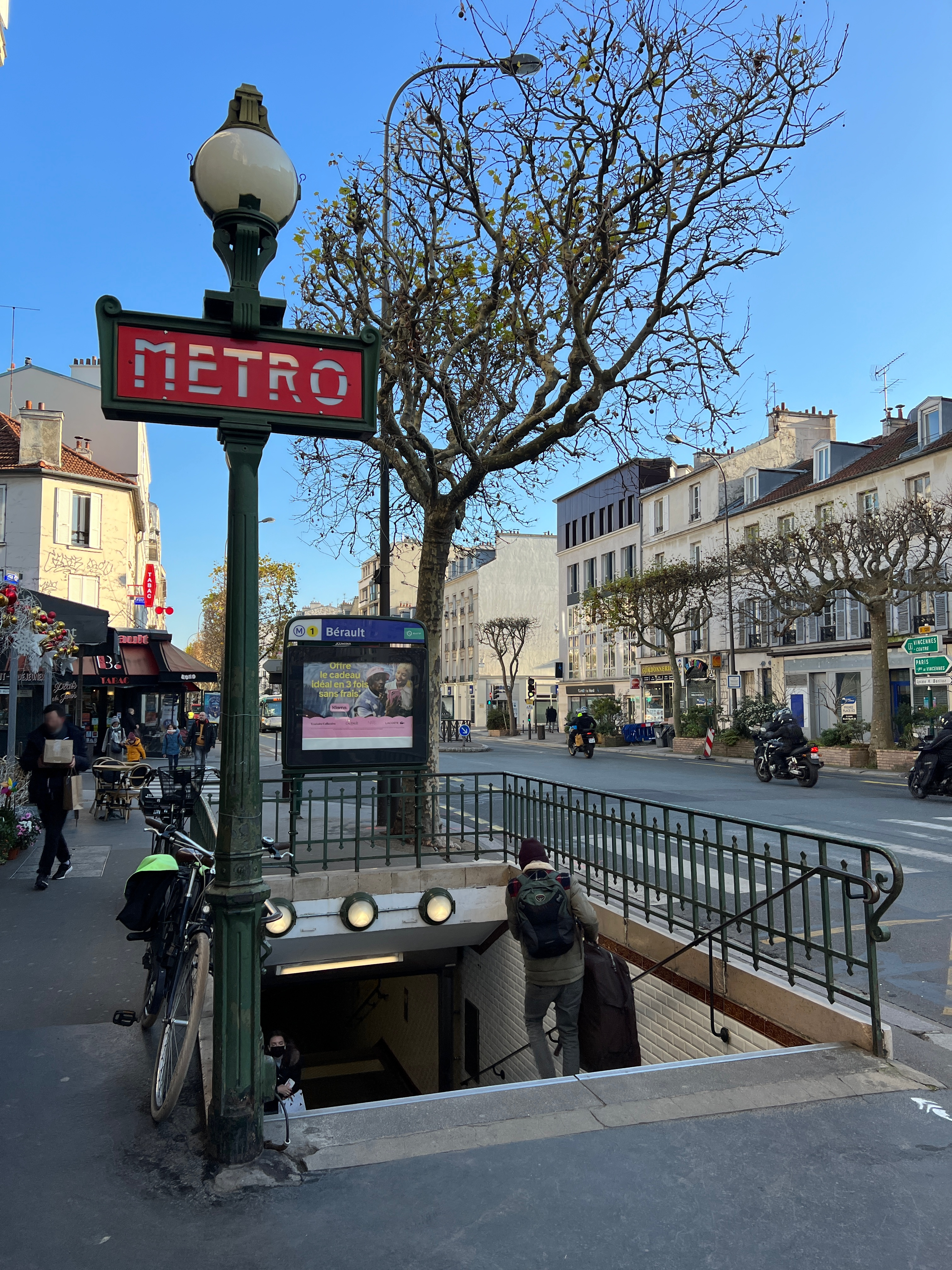
Access 2

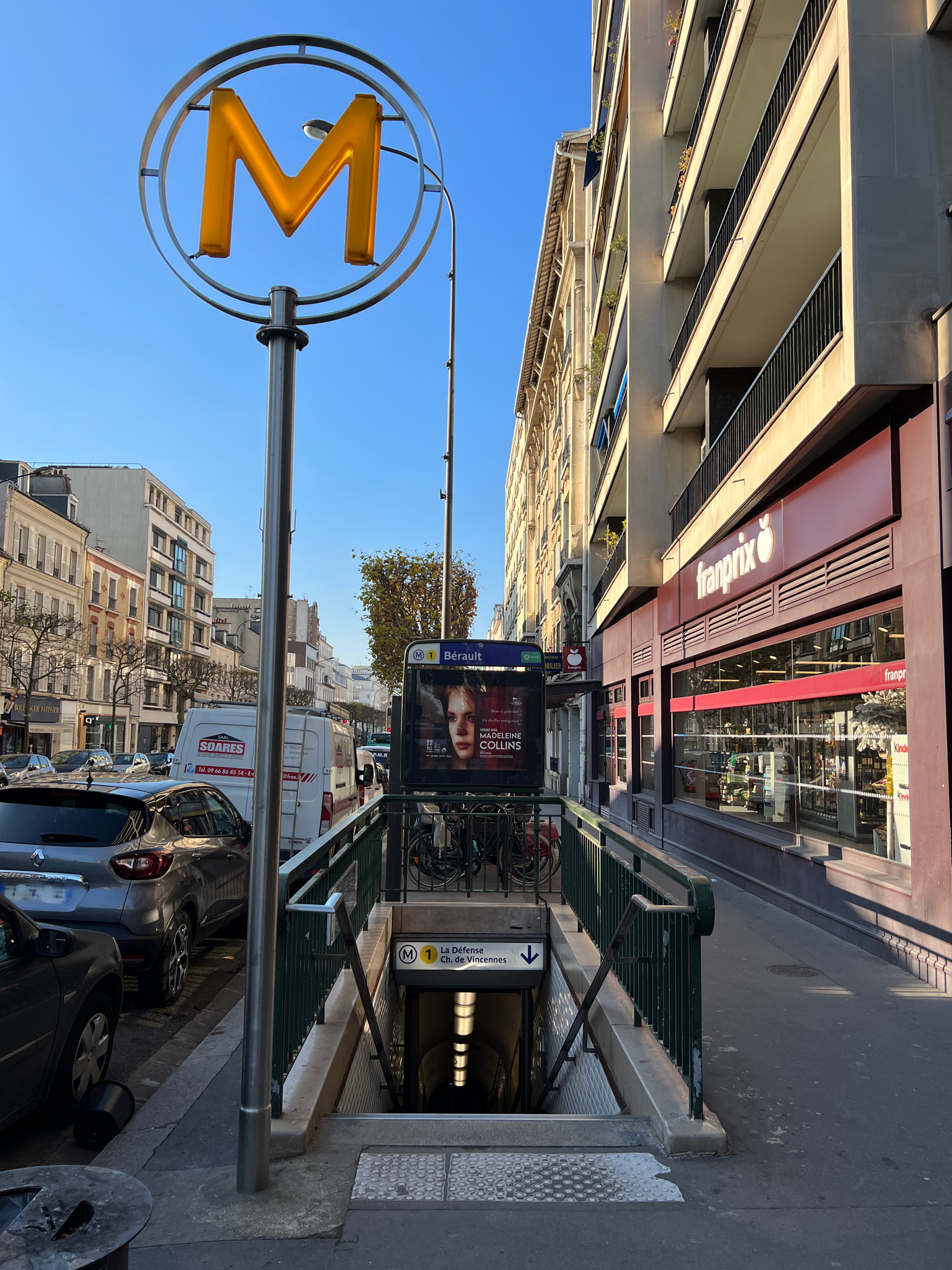
Access 3

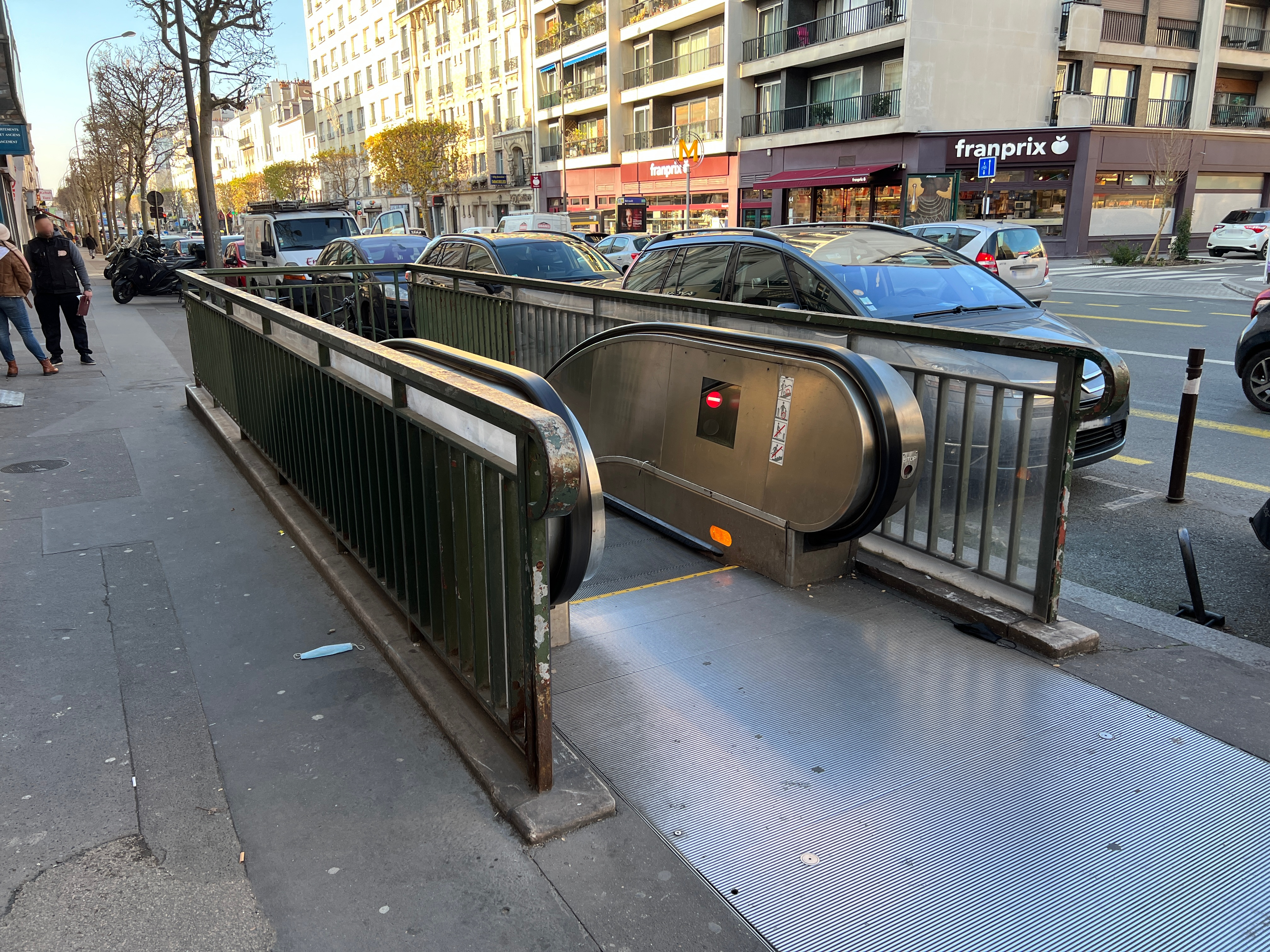
Access 4

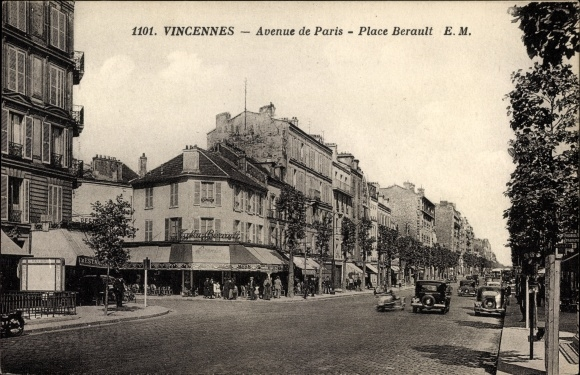
Historical picture of Place Bérault (today's access 2 can be seen in the bottom left)
