= Porte de Vincennes station =

Metro station in Paris, France

Porte de Vincennes
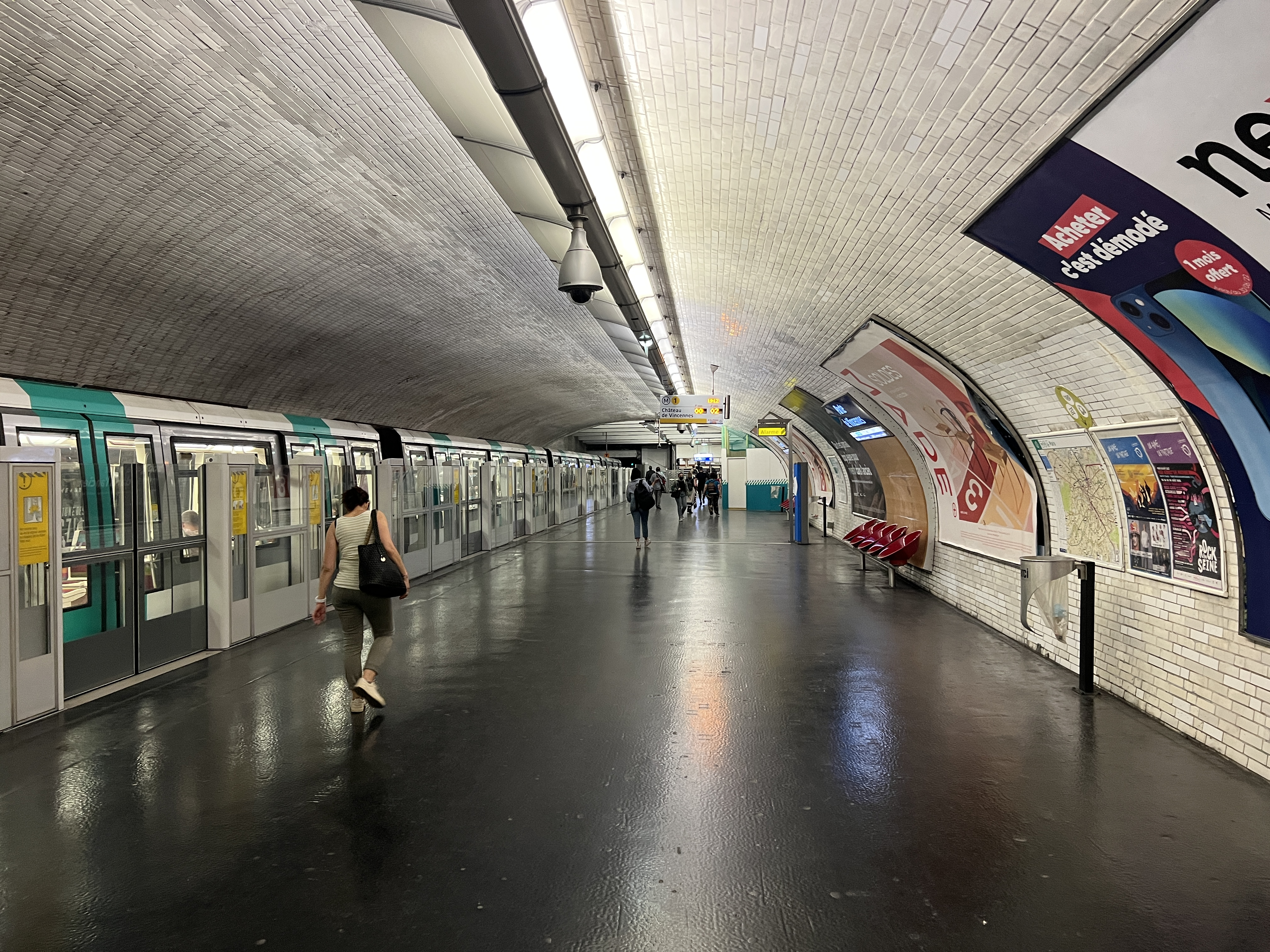

General information
- Location: 81, cours de Vincennes; 90, cours de Vincennes; 99, cours de Vincennes; 102, cours de Vincennes; 106, cours de Vincennes; 12th arrondissement of Paris; Île-de-France; France
- Coordinates: 48°50′50″N 2°24′28″E
- Owner: RATP
- Operator: RATP
- Line: Paris Metro Paris Metro Line 1
- Platforms: 2 (2 side platforms)
- Tracks: 2
- Connections: RATP Bus: 86 325; Noctilien: N11

Construction
- Accessible: no

Other information
- Station code: 05-07
- Fare zone: 1

History
- Opened: 19 July 1900; 126 years ago

Passengers
- 5,446,602 (2021)

Services
Preceding station	Paris Metro	Following station
Nation towards La Défense	Line 1	Saint-Mandé towards Château de Vincennes
Preceding station	Tram	Following station
Alexandra David-Néel towards Pont du Garigliano	T3a	Terminus
Porte de Montreuil towards Porte Dauphine	T3b	Terminus
Route map
Location
- Location within Paris

Porte de Vincennes (French pronunciation: [pɔʁt də vɛ̃sɛn]) is a station on Line 1 of the Paris Métro, situated on the Cours de Vincennes, at the border of the 12th and 20th arrondissements of Paris. It is named after the Porte de Vincennes, a gate at the former Thiers Wall, which was at the beginning of the road to Vincennes.

== History ==
The station opened on 19 July 1900 as part of the first stage of line 1 between Porte de Vincennes and Porte Maillot, serving as its original eastern terminus. It was the site of the very first construction work on the Métro.

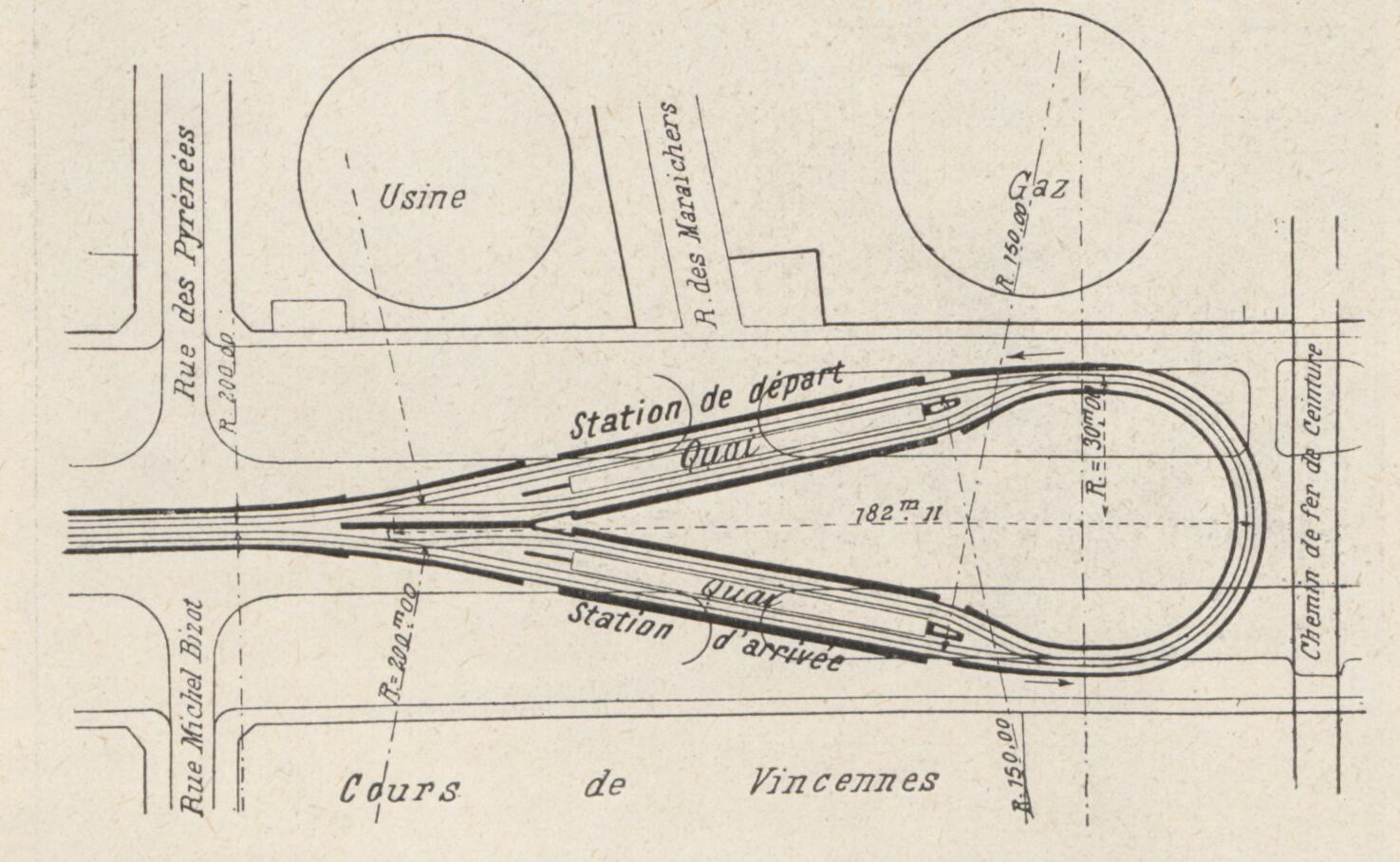

Due to its status at the time as a terminal station, it featured a unique platform configuration, consisting of two diverging half-stations on a single-tracked loop. The southern half-station housed the arrival platform, and the northern half-station housed the departure platform. Each half-station consisted of a central island platform flanked by two tracks. Porte Maillot, then the line's western terminus, also had a similar configuration until the line was further extended west in 1937.

The station remained the line's eastern terminus until it was further extended to Château de Vincennes on 24 March 1934, resulting in several changes in the station's layout. The loop was removed and the tunnels from each half-station were extended to meet further east under Avenue de la Porte-de-Vincennes. The outermost track of each half-station was also removed and filled in, creating a large side platform. The platforms were also lengthened under a new reinforced concrete ceiling, past the original tiled vault.

During the automation of line 1, the station had undergone a series of upgrades. The metal panelling installed since the 1960s was removed and the station's platform walls were retiled. Its platforms were closed from 28-29 June 2008 to reenforce and raise the platform level in preparation for the installation of platform screen doors. The line was fully automated in December 2012.

In 2019, the station was used by 7,633,984 passengers, making it the 33rd busiest of the Métro network out of 302 stations.

In 2020, the station was used by 4,840,436 passengers amidst the COVID-19 pandemic, making it the 17th busiest of the Métro network out of 304 stations.

In 2021, the station was used by 5,446,602 passengers, making it the 25th busiest of the Métro network out of 304 stations.

== Passenger services ==
=== Access ===
The station has 4 accesses:

- Access 1: rue du Général Niessel (with an ascending escalator)
- Access 2: Passage de la Voûte (with an ascending escalator)
- Access 3: avenue du Docteur Arnold Netter
- Access 4: rue des Pyrénées

=== Station layout ===
G	Street Level	Exits/Entrances
M	Mezzanine	Connecting level, passageway to RER, to Exits/Entrances
Platform level	Side platform with PSDs, doors will open on the right
Platform level	Westbound	← toward La Défense – Grande Arche (Nation)
Platform level	Eastbound	toward Château de Vincennes (Saint-Mandé) →
Platform level	Side platform with PSDs, doors will open on the right

=== Platforms ===
The station has 2 half-stations each with a single wide side platform and a single track with platform screen doors, one for each direction.

The station is also one of only two in the network, along with Porte Dauphine on line 2, to have preserved its original decoration with flat cream-coloured tiles, which was one of the experimental decorations tested in 1900 before the famous bevelled white tiles were selected for other parts of the network.

=== Other connections ===
==== Tramway ====
The station has been served by tramway T3a since 15 December 2012 as part of its extension from Porte d'Ivry to Porte de Vincennes, and also by tramway T3b in its initial section from Porte de Vincennes to Porte de la Chapelle that opened on the same day. It is one of four métro stations on the network that is located at one of the former gates of Paris and is served by two tram lines; the other three are Porte de Choisy (line 7), Balard (line 8), and Porte de Versailles (line 12). Basilique de Saint-Denis (line 13) is the only station served by two tram lines not located at one of the former gates of Paris.

==== Bus ====
The station is also served by lines 26, 64, 86, 215, 351, and La Traverse de Charonne (501) of the RATP bus network, and at night, by line N11 of the Noctilien bus network.

== Nearby ==
- Église Saint-Gabriel
- Lycée Hélène Boucher
- Lycée Maurice-Ravel
- square Réjane
- square Sarah Bernhardt

== Gallery ==
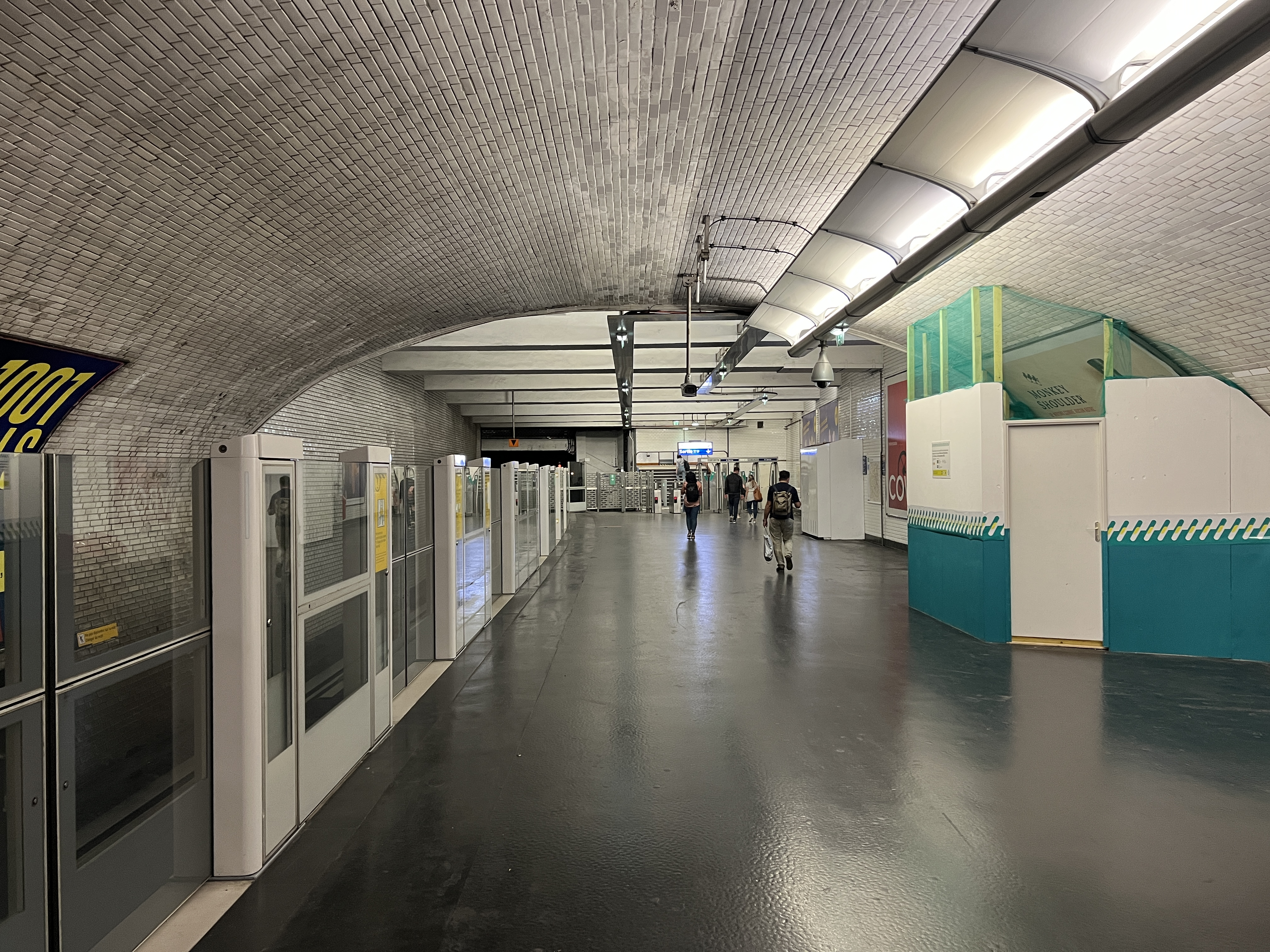
Extended platform under reinforced concrete

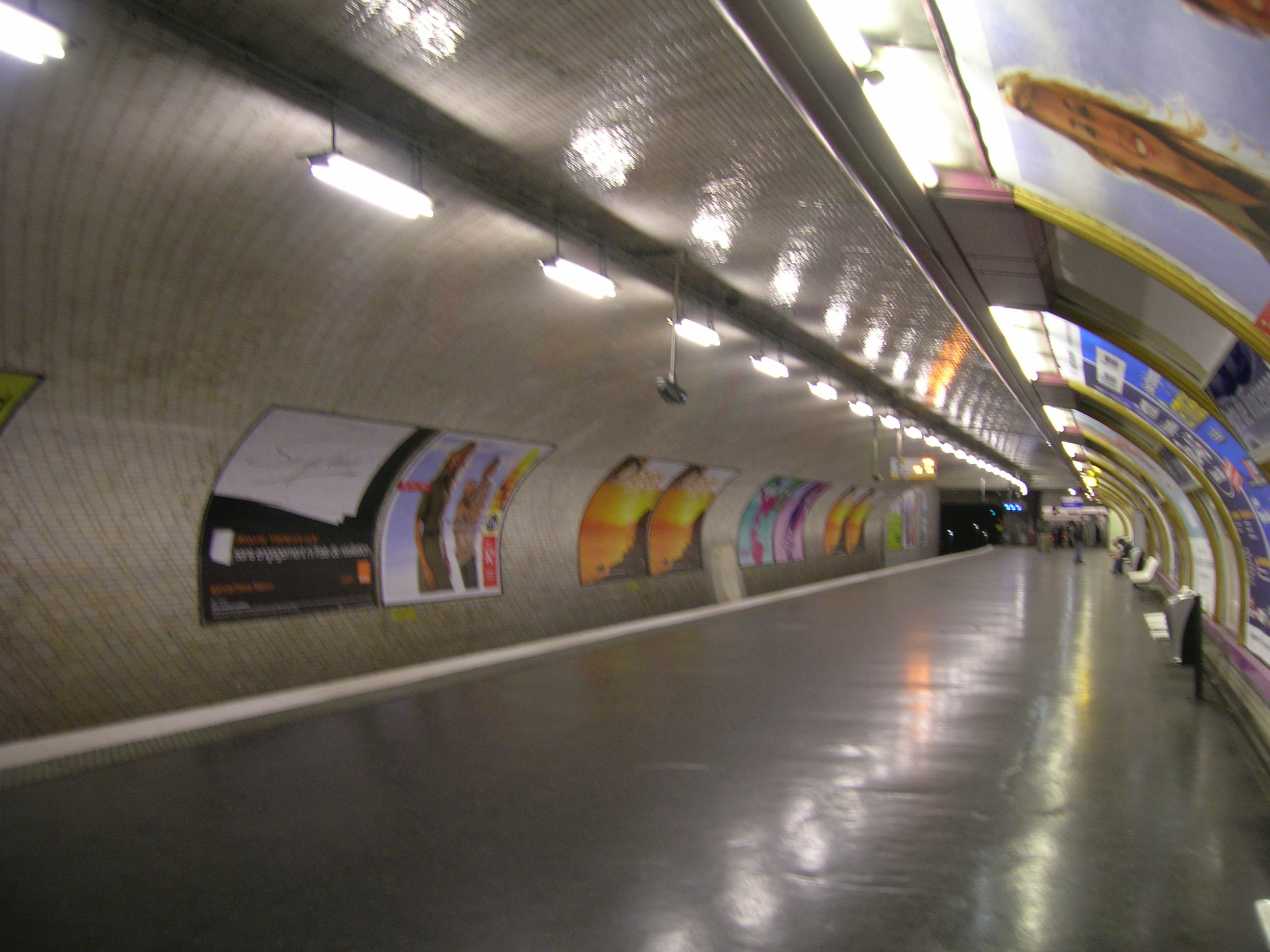
The station before the installation of platform screen doors

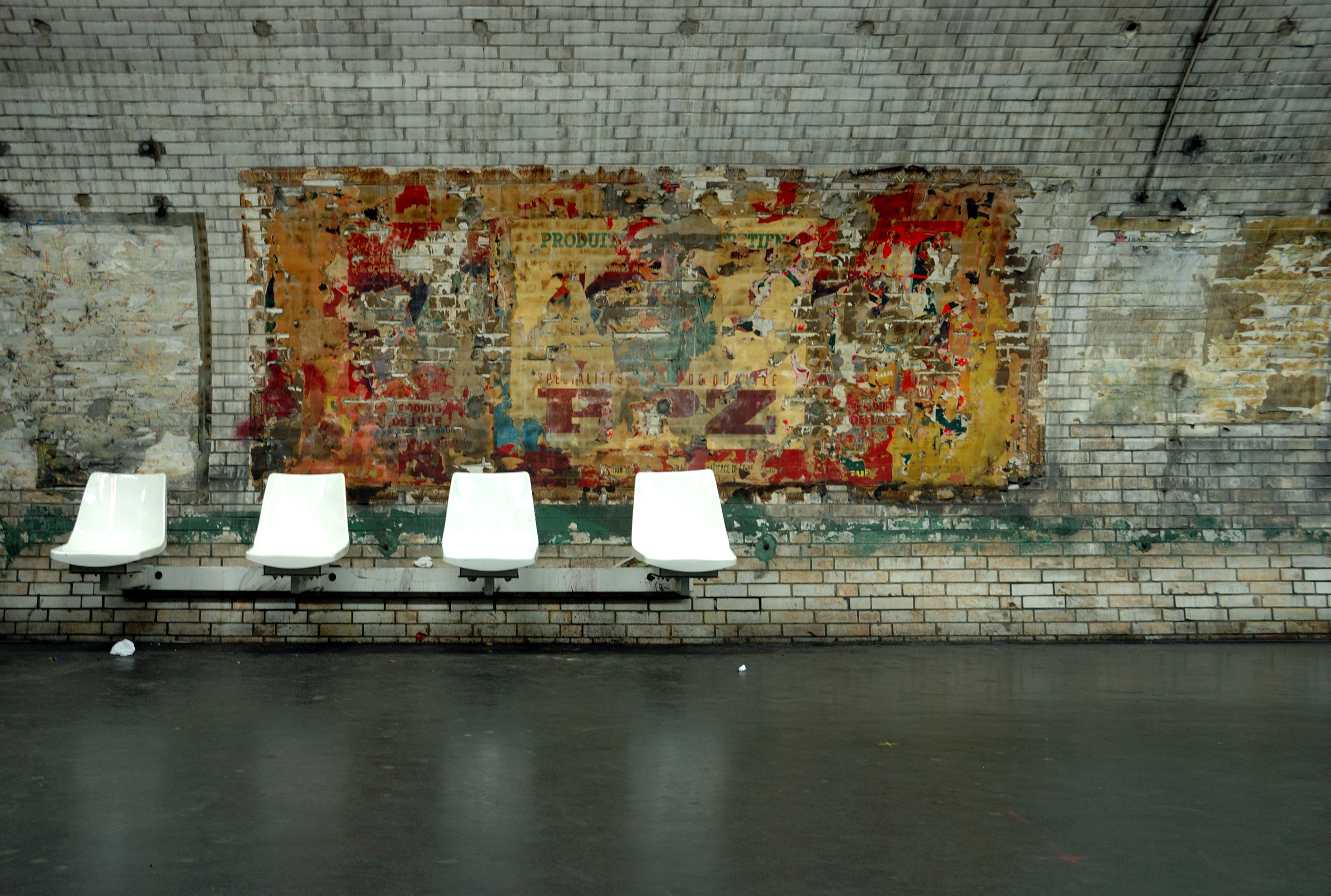
Old advertising from the 1950-70s revealed when the station was under renovation in 2008

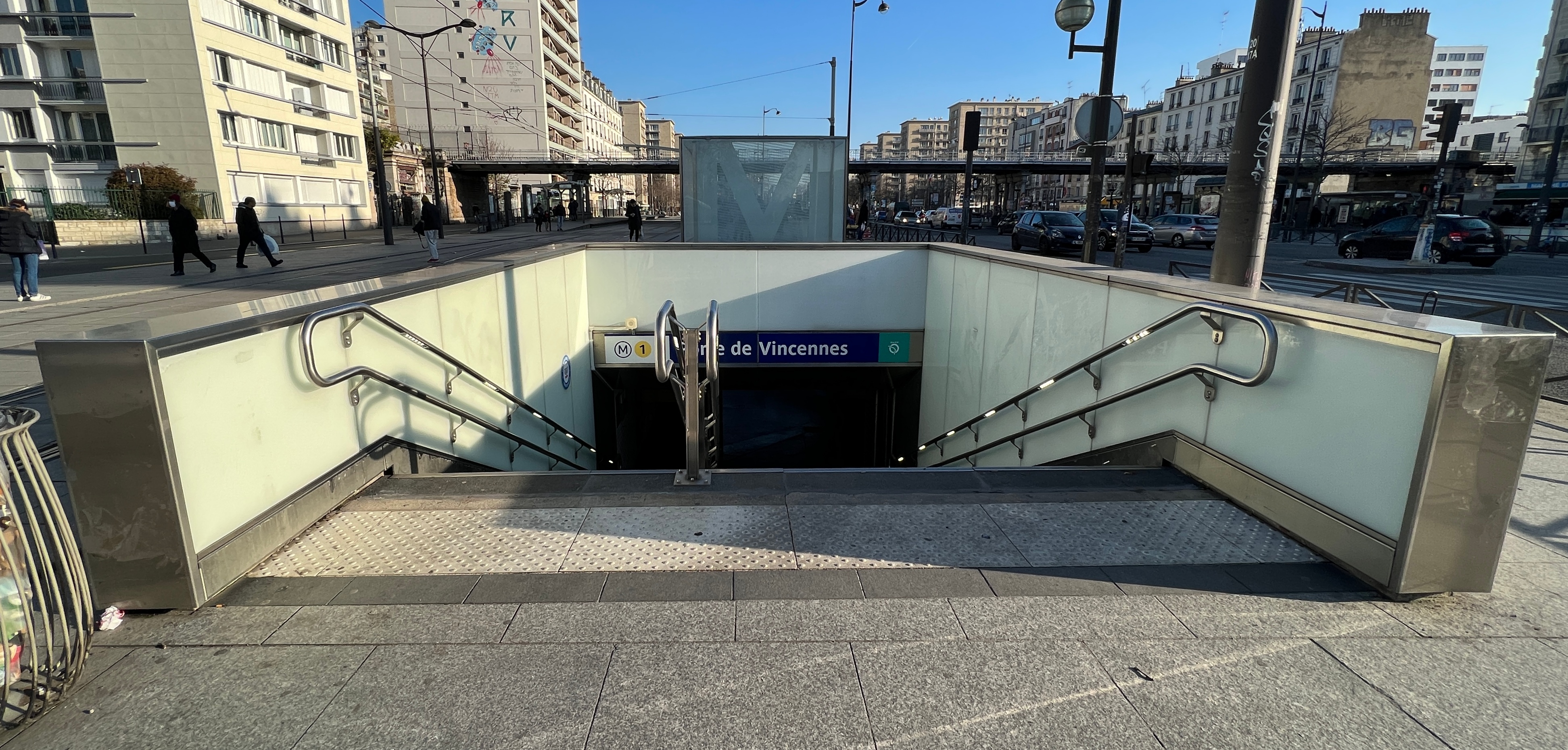
Access 1

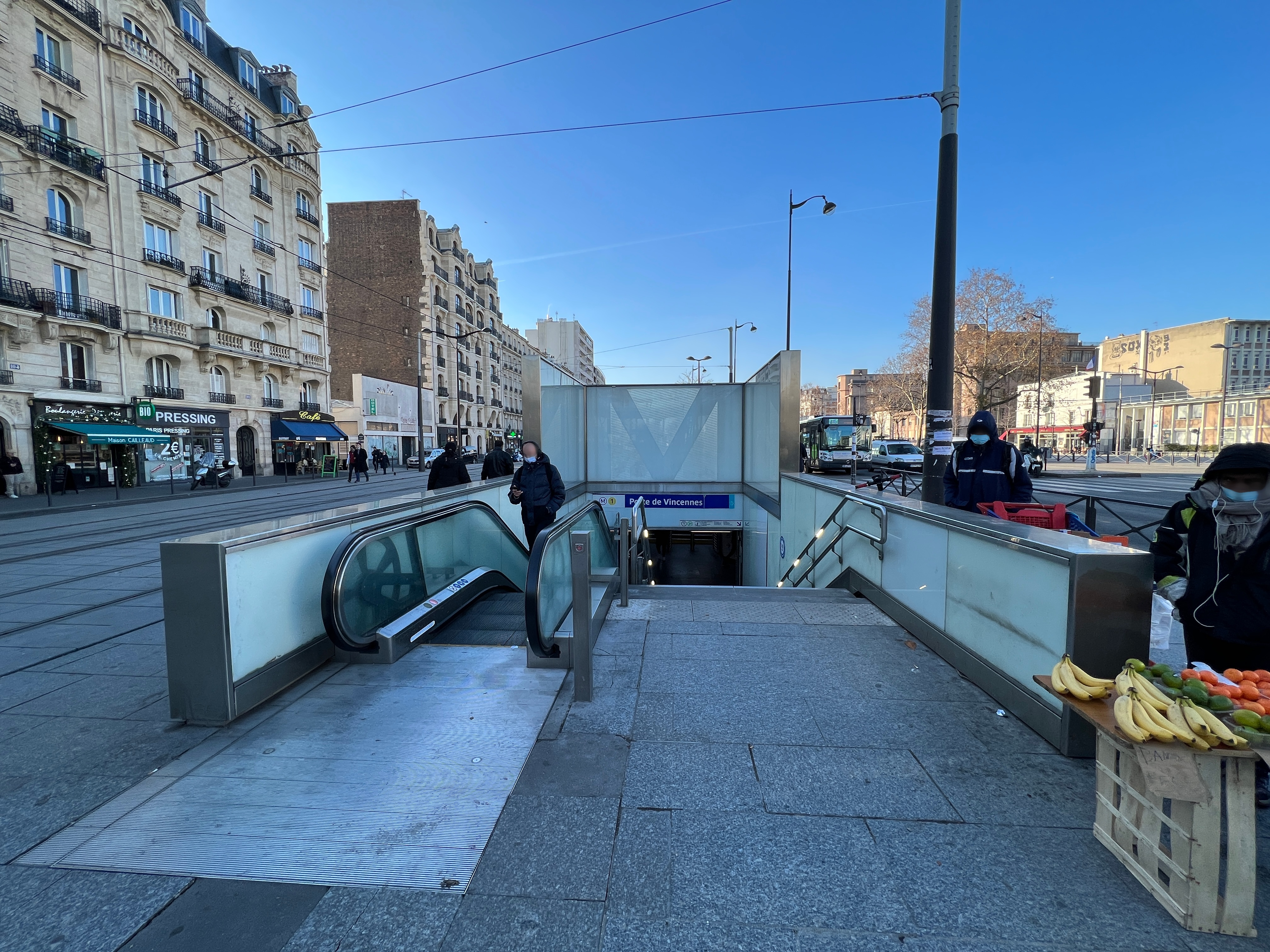
Access 2

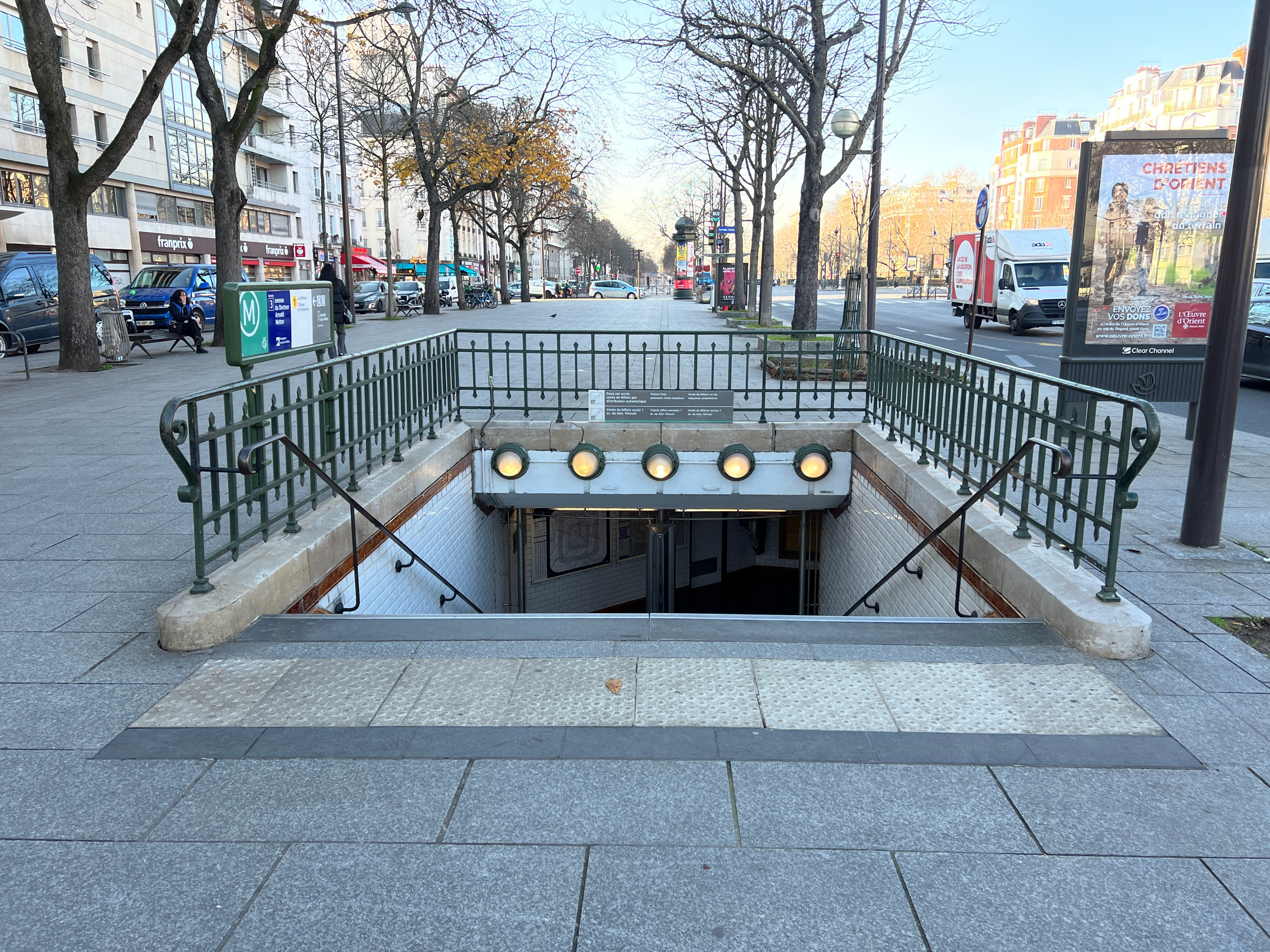
Access 3

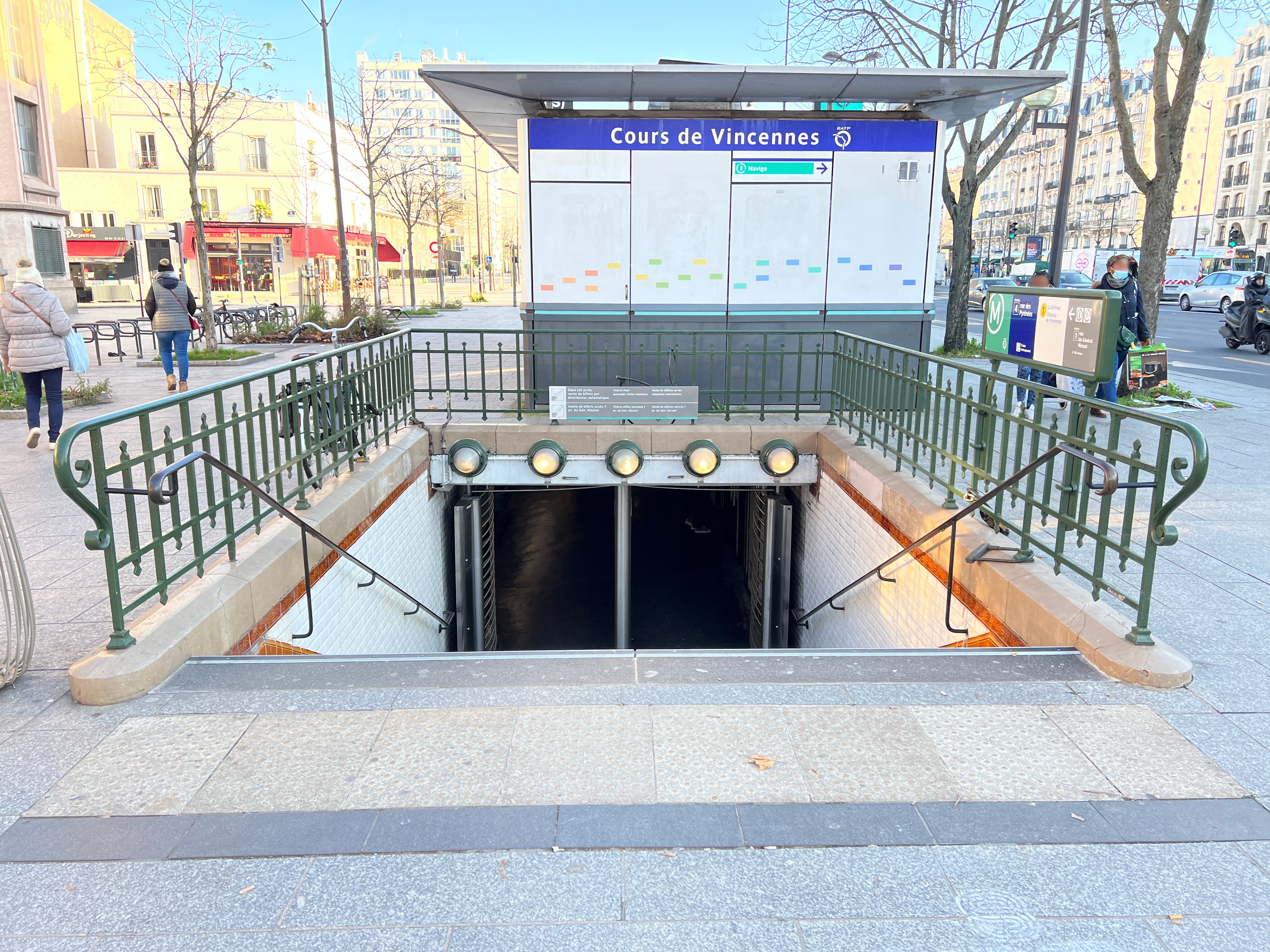
Access 4

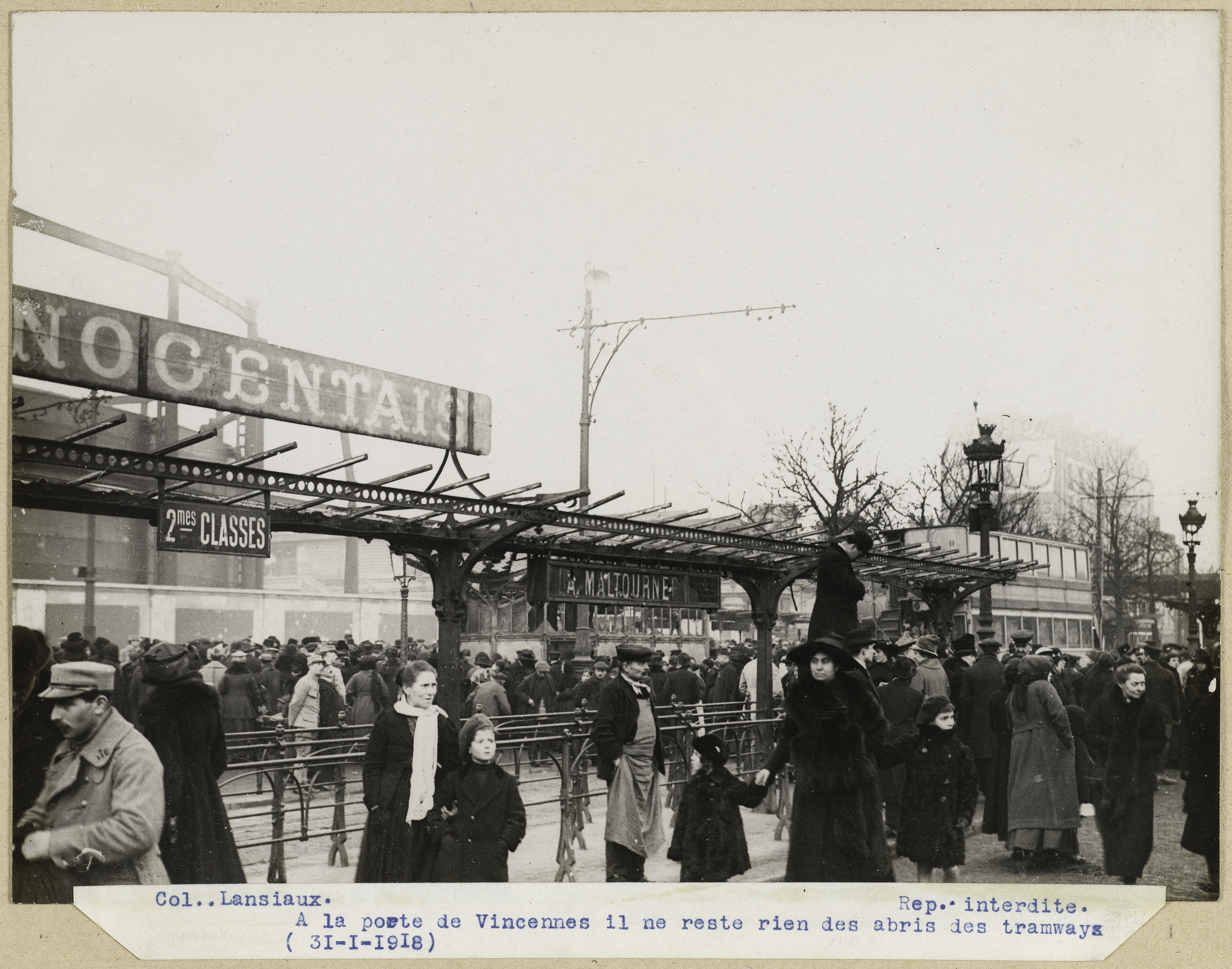
A Guimard entrance can be seen in the background, demolished since 1933
