= Château de Vincennes station =

Paris Métro station

Château de Vincennes
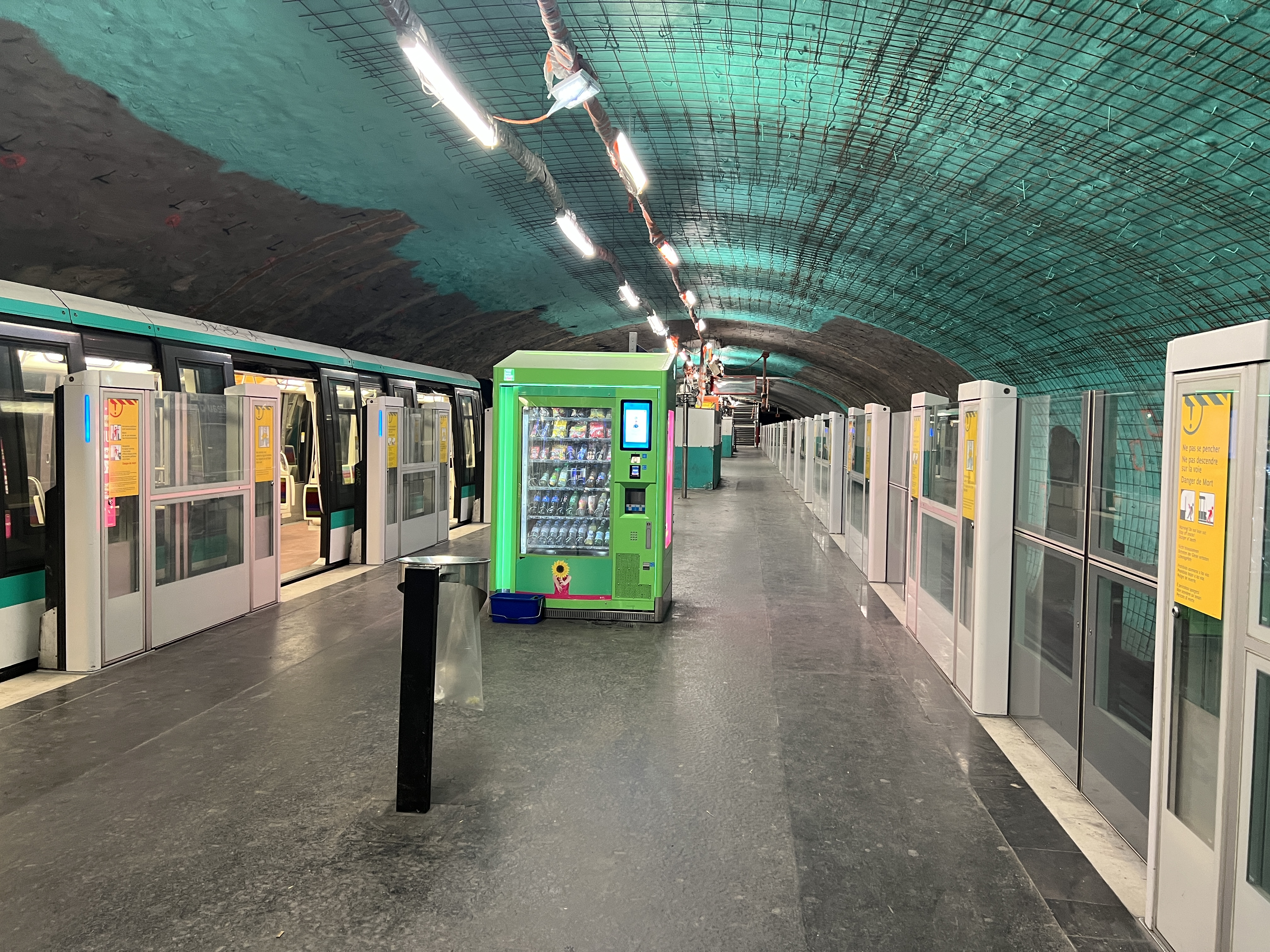

General information
- Location: Vincennes; Île-de-France; France
- Coordinates: 48°50′40″N 2°26′24″E
- System: Paris Métro station
- Owner: RATP
- Operator: RATP
- Line: Paris Metro Paris Metro Line 1
- Platforms: 2 (2 island platforms)
- Tracks: 4
- Connections: RATP Bus: 46 56 112 114 115 118 124 210 215 318 325; Noctilien: N11 N33

Construction
- Accessible: no

Other information
- Station code: 2511
- Fare zone: 2

History
- Opened: 24 March 1934; 92 years ago

Passengers
- 3,617,738 (2021)

Services
| Preceding station | Paris Metro | Following station |
|---|---|---|
| Bérault towards La Défense | Line 1 | Terminus |
Route map
Location
- Location within Paris

Château de Vincennes (French pronunciation: [ʃɑto d(ə) vɛ̃sɛn]) is a station on line 1 of the Paris Métro, situated on the border between the communes of Vincennes and the Bois de Vincennes, which is part of the 12th arrondissement of Paris. It is named after the nearby Château de Vincennes.

== History ==
The station opened on 24 March 1934 as part of the line's extension from Porte de Vincennes, serving as its eastern terminus since.

During the automation of line 1, the station had undergone a series of upgrades. Its platforms were closed from 25-26 August, then again from 1-2 September 2009 to reenforce and raise the platform level for the installation of platform screen doors. During this period, Bérault became the temporary eastern terminus of line 1. The line was fully automated in December 2012.

In 2023, a new contemporary art piece was installed at the station concourse, featuring artwork inspired by the history of Vincennes and its environs. It was done in partnership with the Centre des monuments nationaux (CMN), Vincennes Town Hall, and the Defence Historical Service – Château de Vincennes.

In 2019, the station was used by 6,353,285 passengers, making it the 50th busiest of the Métro network out of 302 stations.

In 2020, the station was used by 3,735,738 passengers amidst the COVID-19 pandemic, making it the 34th busiest of the Métro network out of 304 stations.

In 2021, the station was used by 3,617,738 passengers, making it the 71st busiest of the Métro network out of 304 stations.

== Passenger services ==
=== Access ===
The station has 6 accesses:

- Access 1: avenue de Paris
- Access 2: Château de Vincennes
- Access 3: Cours des Maréchaux Parc Floral
- Access 4: Fort Neuf
- Access 5: Cours Marigny
- Access 6: Bois de Vincennes

=== Station layout ===
| G | Street level | Exit/Entrance |
| M | Mezzanine | Faregates |
| Platforms | Platform 3 | ← toward La Défense – Grande Arche (Bérault) |
| Platforms | Island platform with PSDs, doors open on the left for platform 3, right for platform 1 |
| Platforms | Platform 1 | ← toward La Défense – Grande Arche (Bérault) |
| Platforms | Platform 2 | termination platform → |
| Platforms | Island platform with PSDs, doors open on the left for platform 4, right for platform 2 |
| Platforms | Platform 4 | termination platform → |

=== Platforms ===
The station has a particular arrangement specific to the stations serving or had served as a terminus. It has 2 identical half-stations each with an island platform flanked by two tracks, similar to Porte de Champerret on line 3, Porte de Pantin and Porte de la Villette on line 7. One half-station is used for arriving trains, while the other is used for departing trains towards La Défense.

Platform screen doors have been installed on it since 2009.

=== Other connections ===
The station is also served by lines 46, 56, 112, 114, 115, 118, 124, 210, 318, and 325 of the RATP bus network, and at night, by lines N11 and N33 of the Noctilien bus network.

== Gallery ==
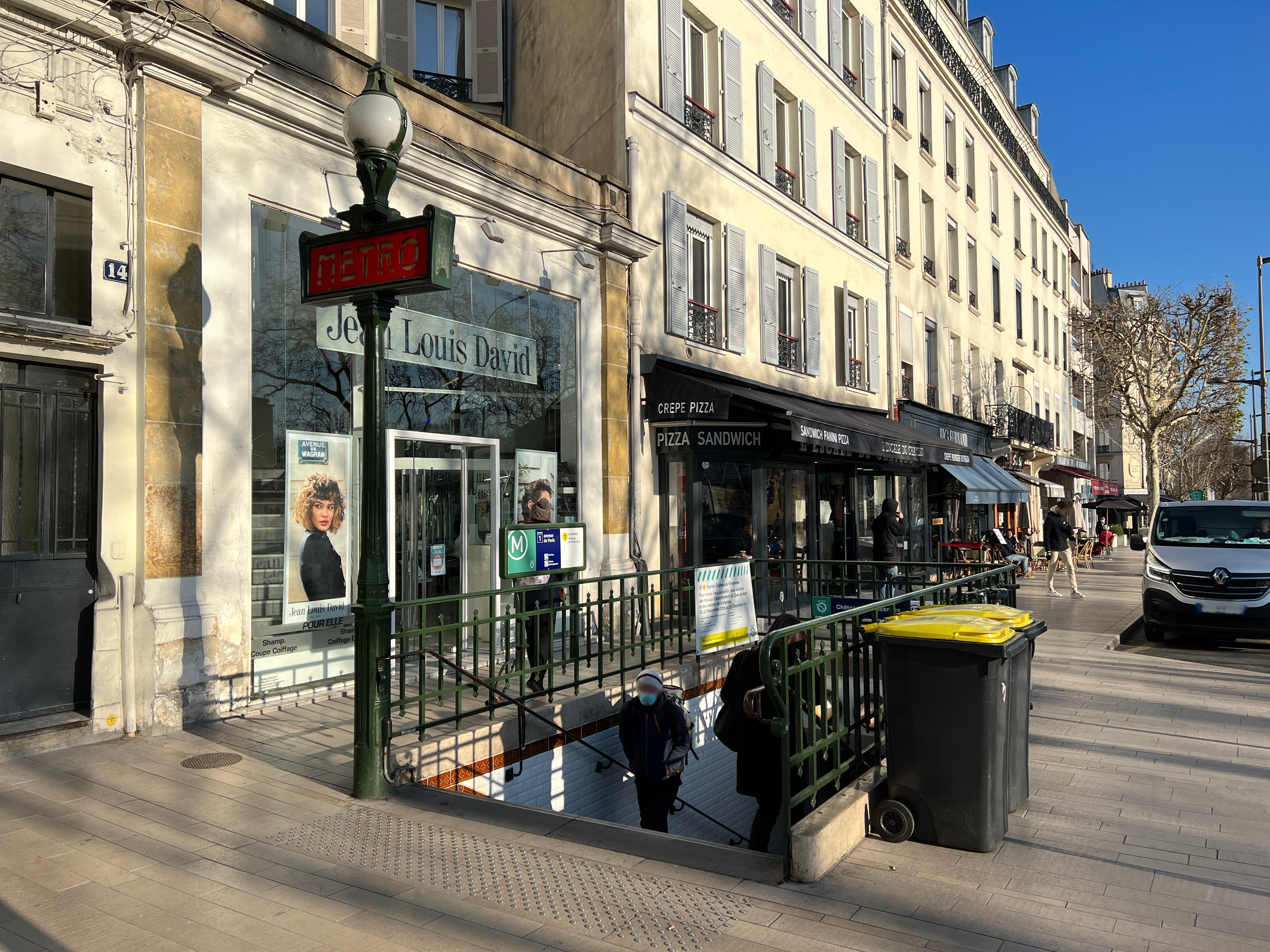
Access 1

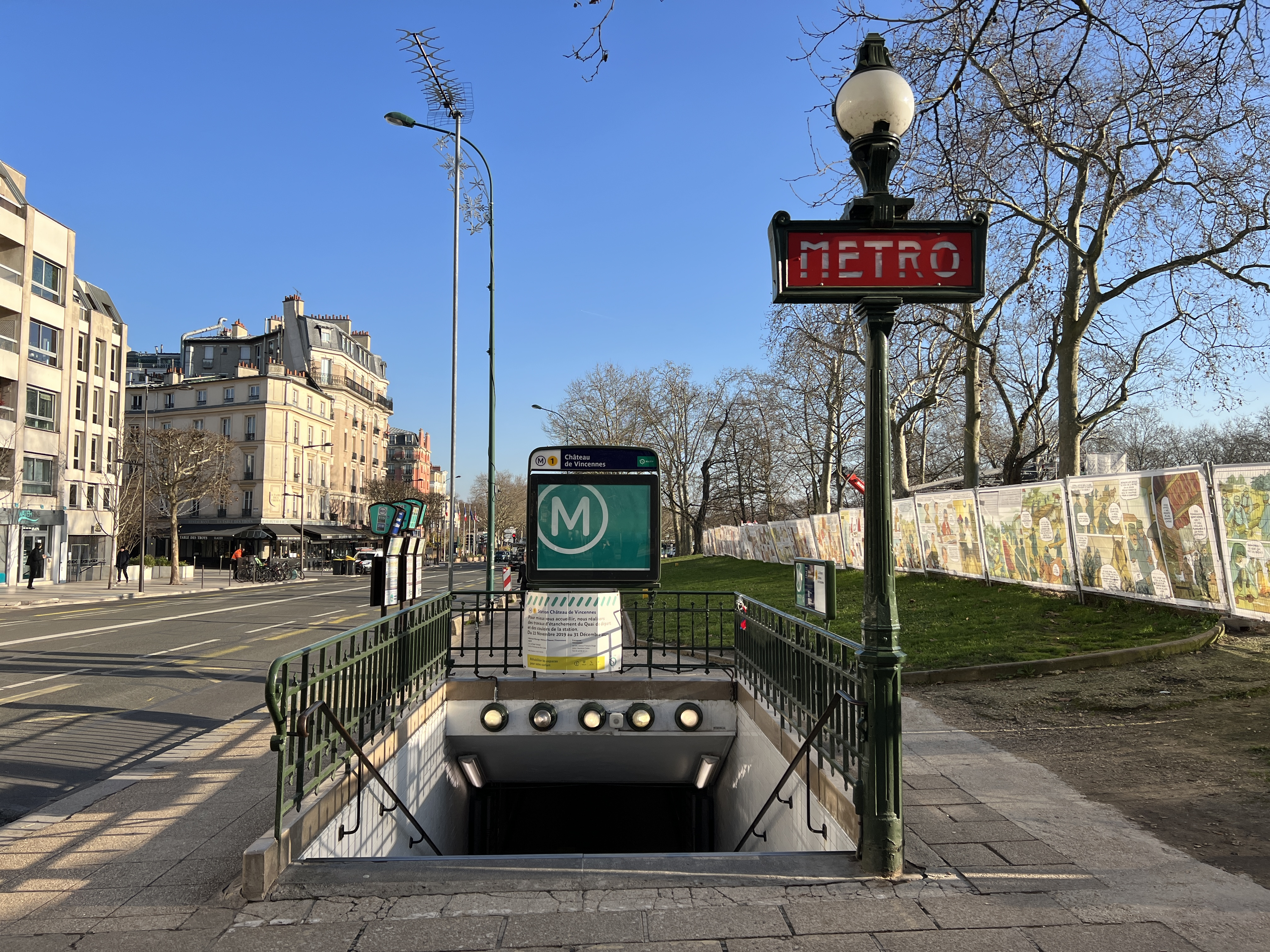
Access 2

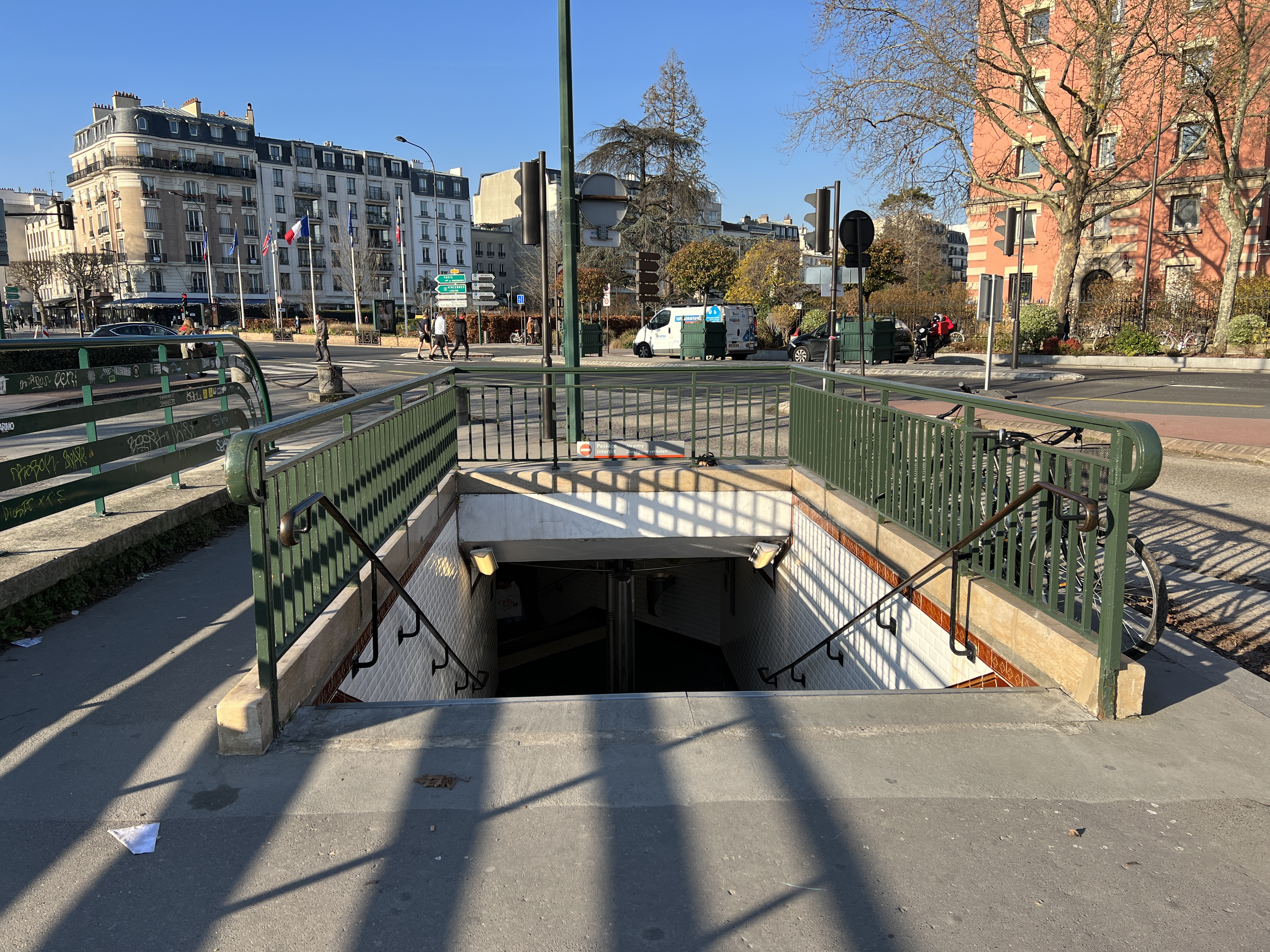
Access 3

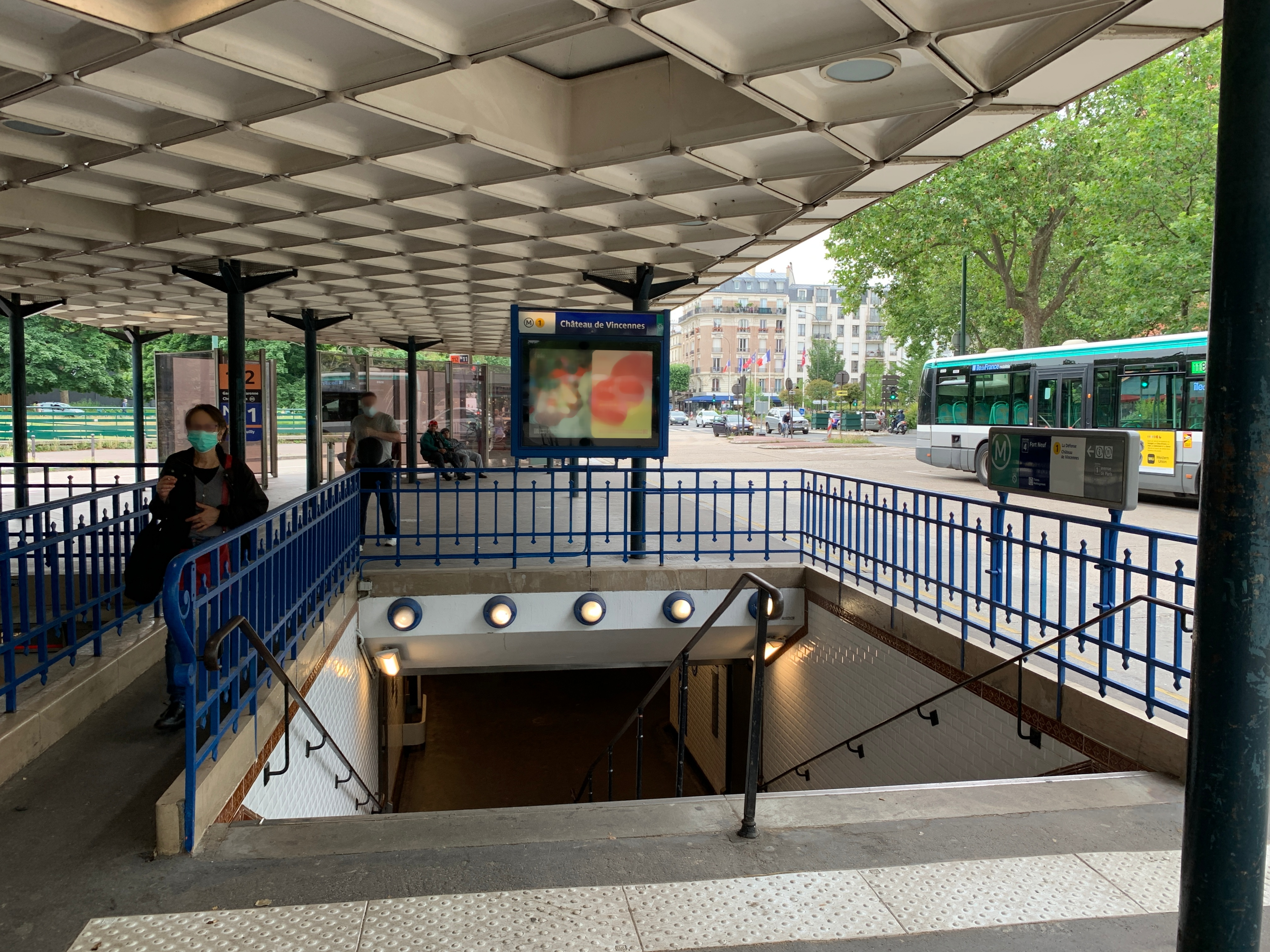
Access 4

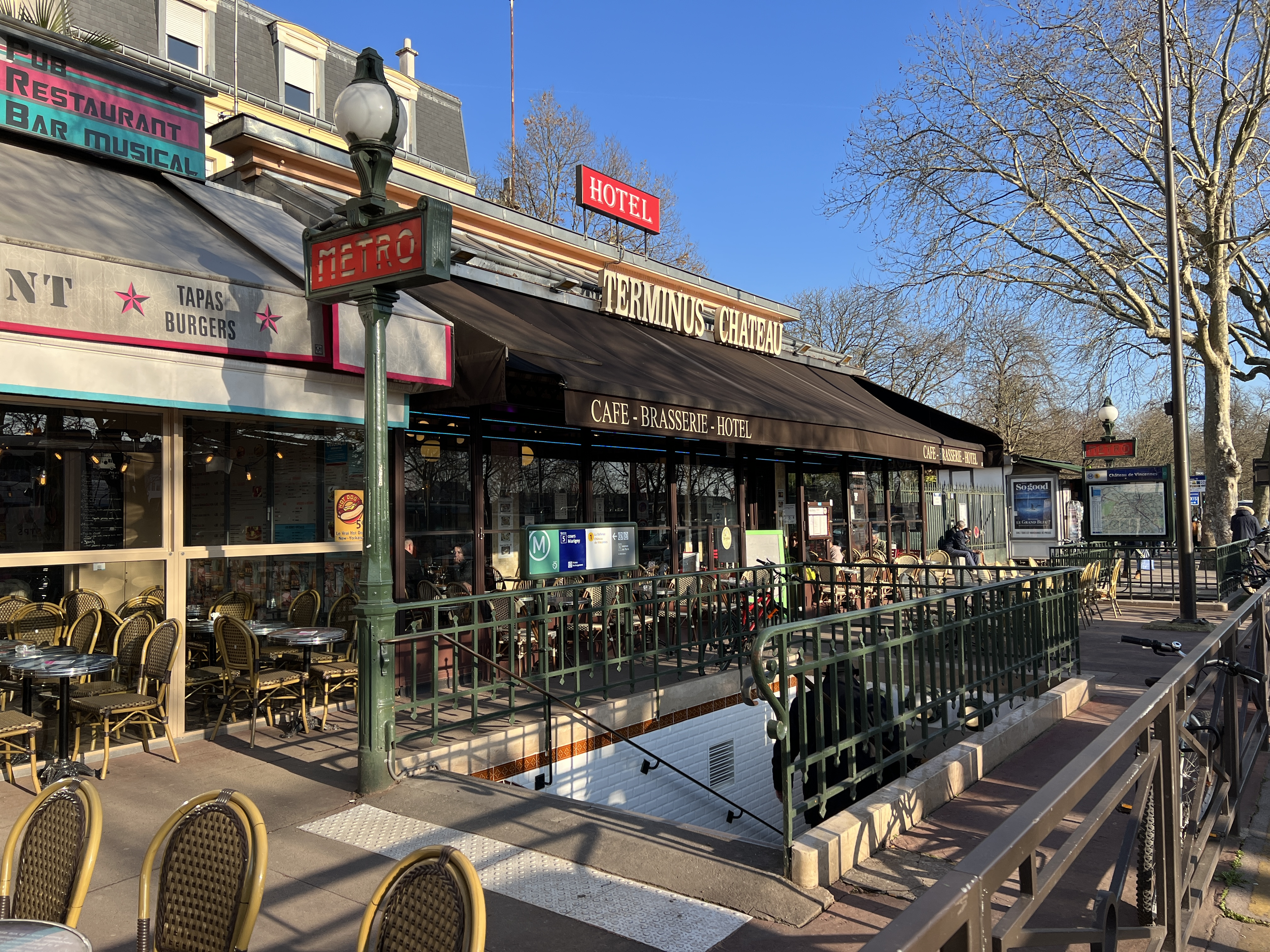
Access 5

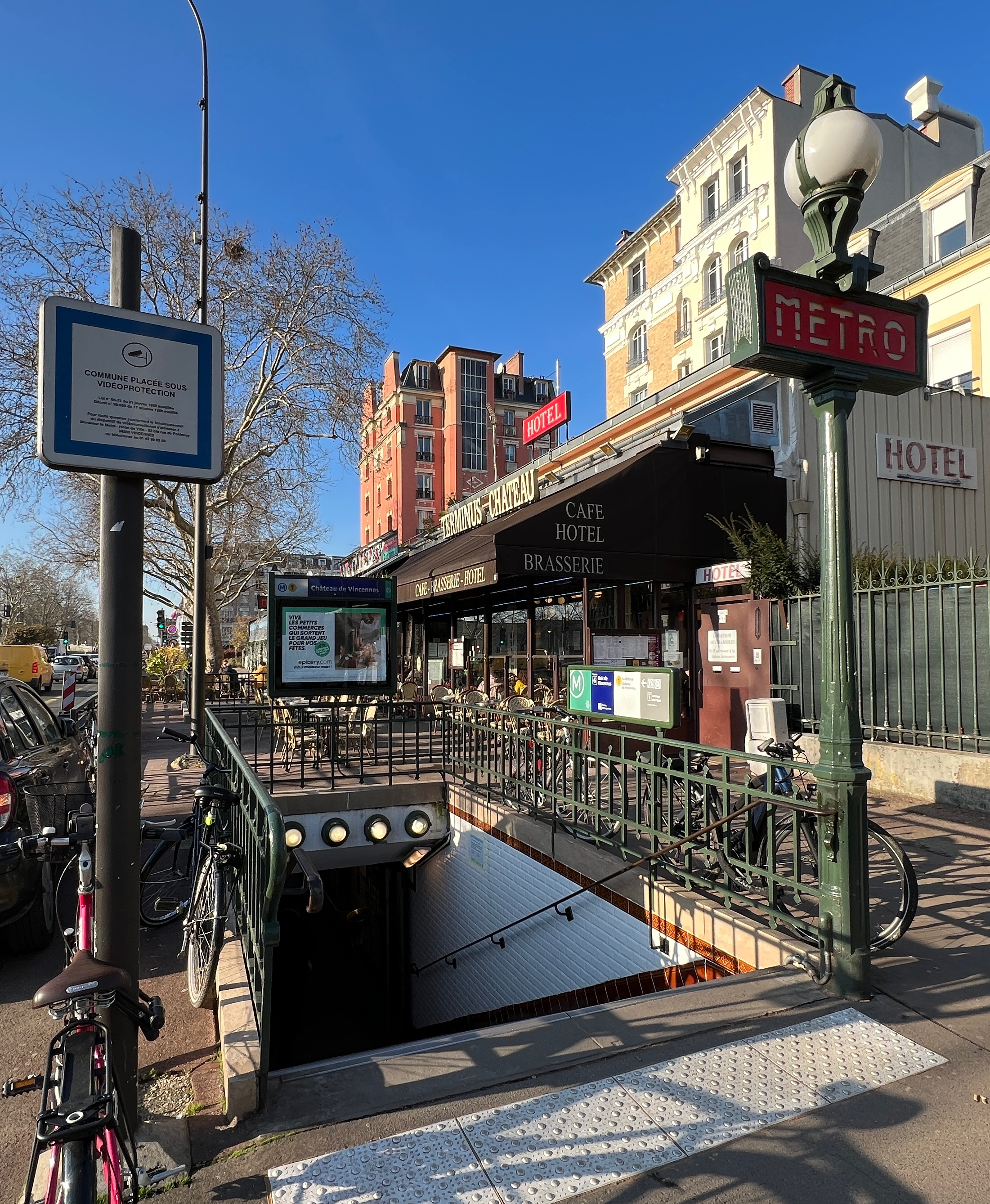
Access 6

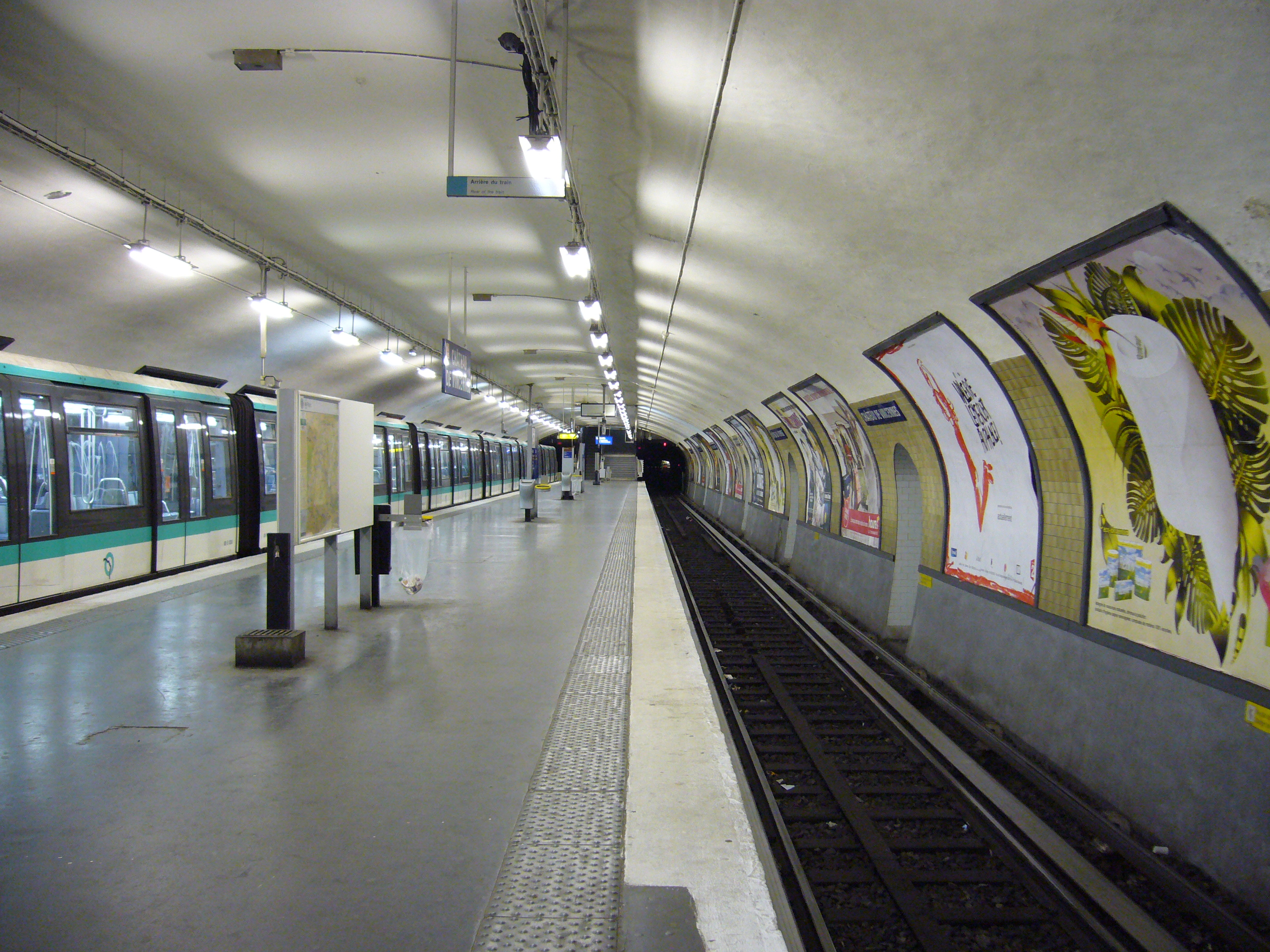
The station before the installation of platform screen doors

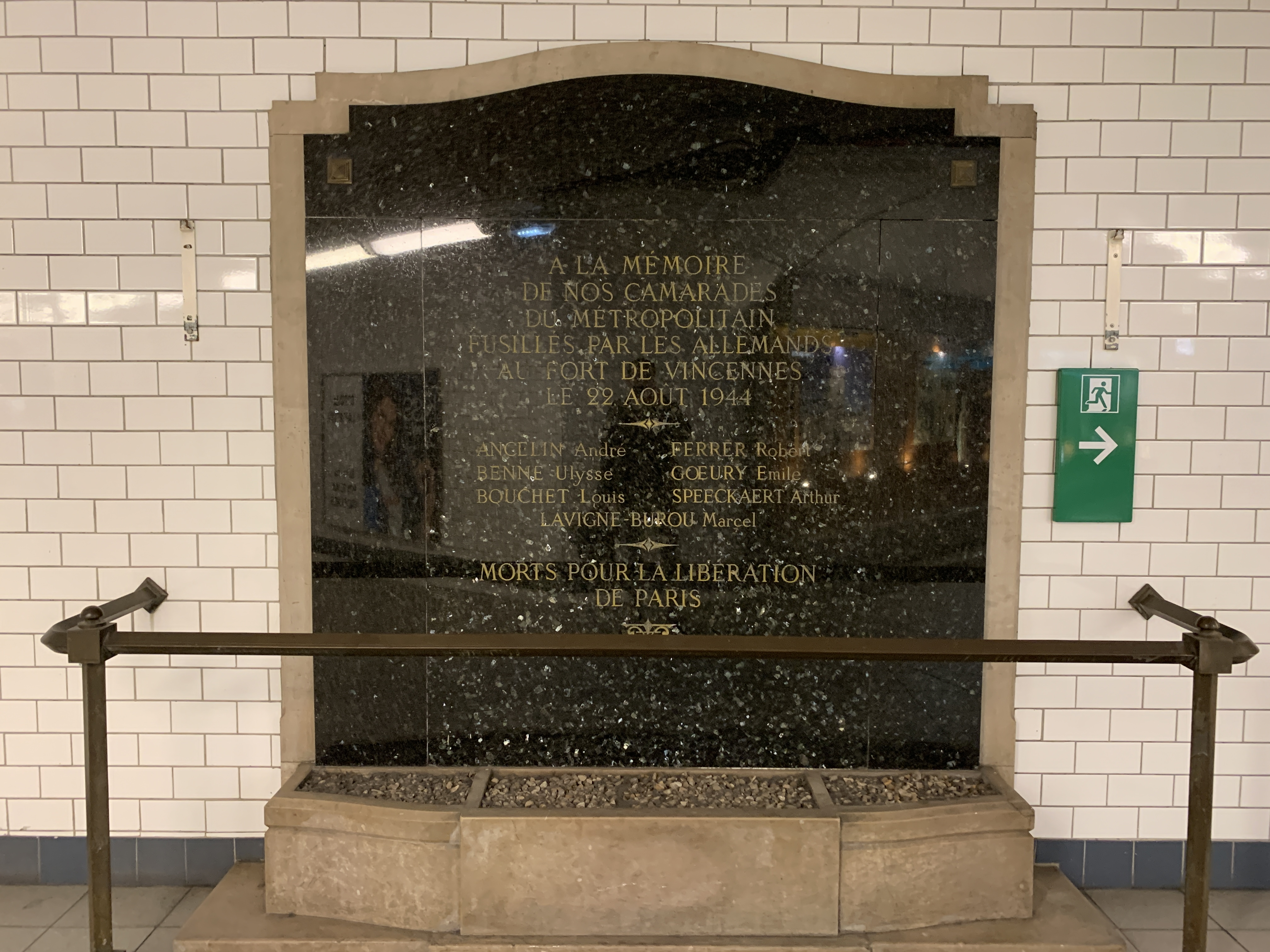
Monument to the resistance fighters who were shot at the nearby Fort de Vincennes on 22 August 1944

== See also ==
- List of stations of the Paris Métro
