= Pompidou (disambiguation) =

Pompidou or Le Pompidou may refer to:

- Georges Pompidou (1911–1974), French Prime Minister and President
- Claude Pompidou (1912–2007), wife of Georges Pompidou and a French politician
- Alain Pompidou (1942–2024), foster son of Georges Pompidou and President of the European Patent Office, 2004–2007
- Xavier Pompidou (born 1972), French racing driver
- Centre Pompidou, a building named after Georges Pompidou
  - Centre Pompidou-Metz, a museum in Metz, Lorraine, France
  - Centre Pompidou Hanwha, a museum in Yeouido, Seoul, South Korea
- Pompidou Group, a co-operation platform of the Council of Europe on matters of drug policy founded by Georges Pompidou
- Le Pompidou, a commune in Lozère, Occitania, France
- Pompidou (TV series), a BBC comedy serie
- Hôpital Européen Georges-Pompidou, a hospital located in 15th arrondissement, Paris, France
- Lycée Français International Georges Pompidou, a French international school in Dubai, United Arab Emirates
- Stade Georges Pompidou, a stadium in Valence, France
- Voie Georges-Pompidou, route crossing Paris, France

== See also ==
- Pompadour (disambiguation)
- Pumpido, a surname
