= Porte de Versailles station =

Metro station in Paris, France

Porte de Versailles Parc des Expositions de Paris
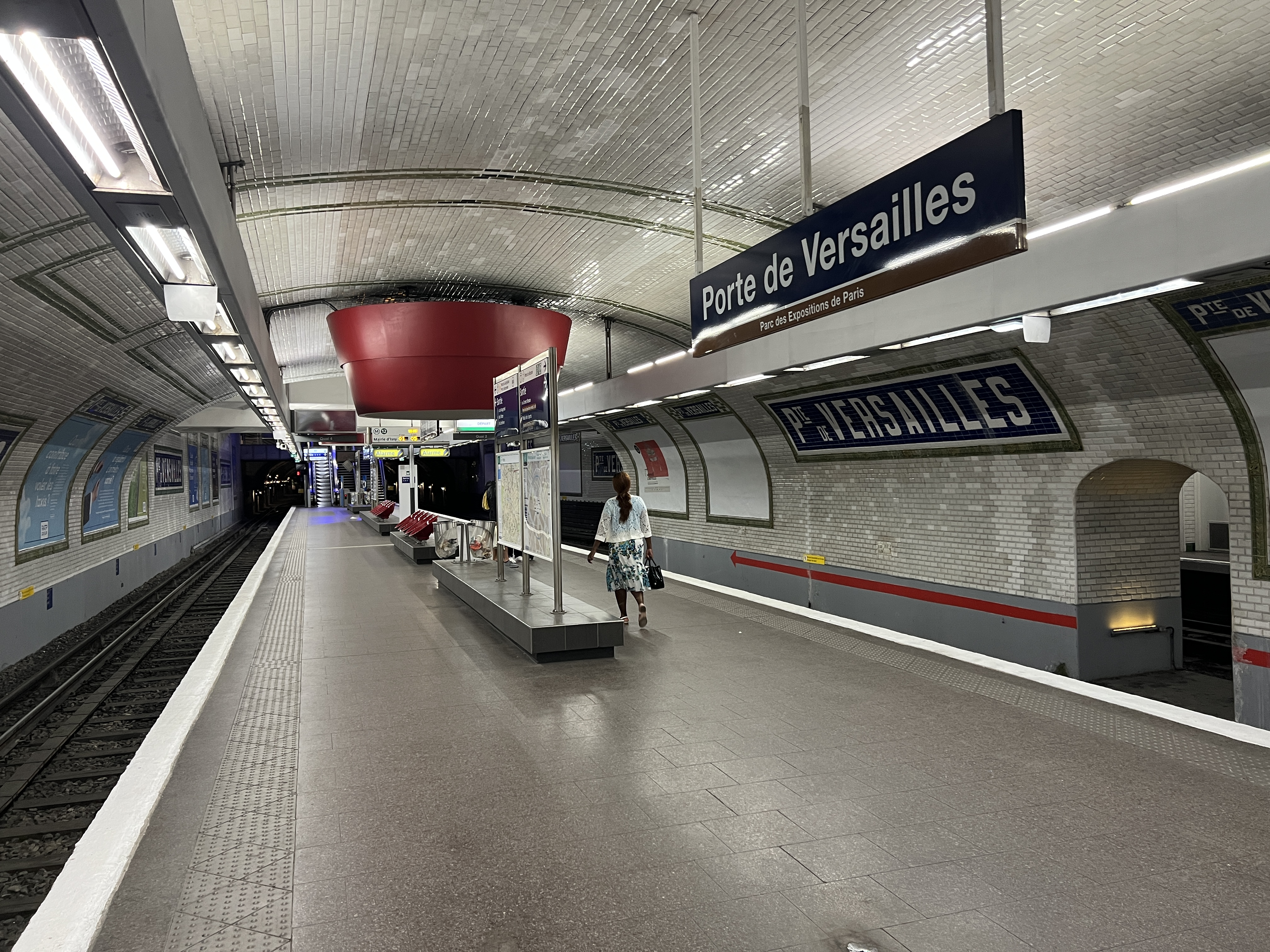
- The island platform at Porte de Versailles

General information
- Location: 15th arrondissement of Paris; Île-de-France; France
- Coordinates: 48°49′56″N 2°17′16″E
- System: Paris Métro station
- Owner: RATP
- Operator: RATP
- Line: Paris Metro Paris Metro Line 12
- Platforms: 2 (1 island platform, 1 side platform)
- Tracks: 3
- Connections: Tramways in Île-de-France Île-de-France tramway Line 2 Île-de-France tramway Line 3a

Construction
- Accessible: no

Other information
- Station code: 1606
- Fare zone: 1

History
- Opened: 5 November 1910

Passengers
- 3,268,157 (2021)

Services
| Preceding station | Paris Metro | Following station |
|---|---|---|
| Corentin Celton towards Mairie d'Issy | Line 12 | Convention towards Mairie d'Aubervilliers |
| Preceding station | Tram | Following station |
| Porte d'Issy towards Pont de Bezons | T2 | Terminus |
| Desnouettes towards Pont du Garigliano | T3a | Georges Brassens towards Porte de Vincennes |
Location
- Location within Paris

Porte de Versailles (French pronunciation: [pɔʁt də vɛʁsɑj]; lit. 'Gate of Versailles') is a station on Line 12 of the Paris Métro, a stop on tramway Line T3a, as well as the southern terminus of tramway Line T2 in the 15th arrondissement. It is named after the Porte de Versailles, a gate in the 19th-century Thiers wall of Paris, which led to the city of Versailles.

== History ==
The station opened on 5 November 1910 as part of the original section of the Nord-Sud Company's line A between Porte de Versailles and Notre-Dame-de-Lorette.

On 23 April 1930, a collision between two trains near the station resulted in the deaths of two people and 37 injured. A northbound train parked in front of a red signal between Porte de Versailles and Convention was hit in the rear by another train that had passed two stop signals at full speed.

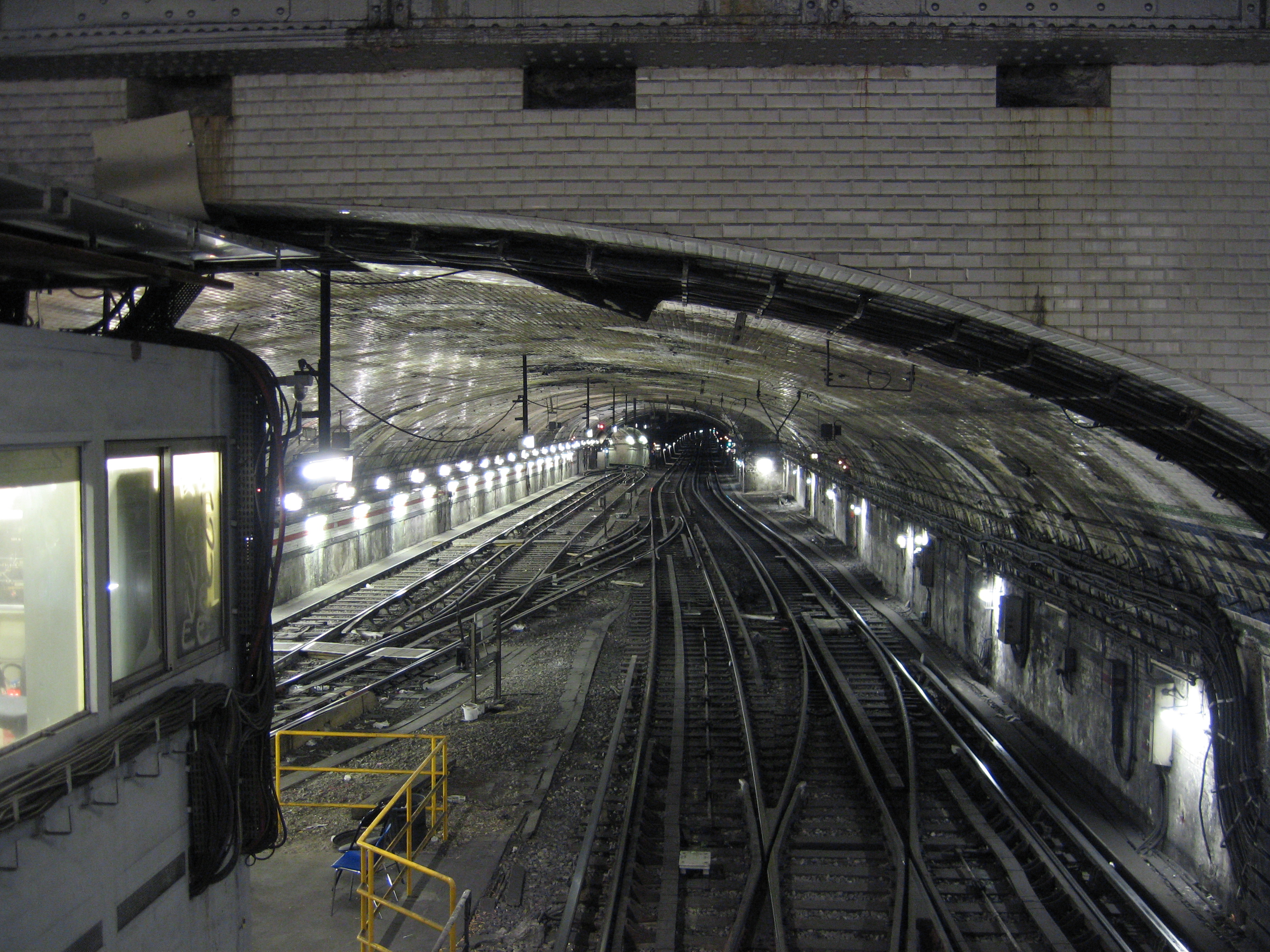
Remnants of the original station to the north of current station, with the tiling on the vault still intact.

In anticipation of its extension south to Mairie d'Issy, the station was relocated south of its original location on 31 December 1929. The old platforms were removed and additional sidings to store trains were installed in its place. The tiling on the vault are the only remaining remnants of the original station; it can still be seen on passing trains. The new station was operated by the Nord-Sud Company for a single day as it was absorbed by its competitor, the Compagnie du chemin de fer métropolitain de Paris (CMP) the next day. Hence, the station was decorated in the traditional Nord-Sud style. On 27 March 1931, line A was renamed line 12. On 24 March 1934, the line's extension to Mairie d'Issy opened, ending the station's role as the southern terminus of the line.

On 10 January 1963, a second collision occurred near the station, injuring around 40 people.

As part of the "Un métro + beau" programme by the RATP, the station's corridors were renovated and modernised on 18 December 2009.

Since 2016, the Vaugirard Workshops, used for the maintenance of trains on line 12 just north of the station, has been under renovation as part of memorandum of understanding between the RATP and the city of Paris. It includes the construction of a new equipment maintenance workshop (EMW), the restructuring of its train maintenance workshop (TMW), as well as the creation of new social and private housing in two phases on a 2.3-hectare site. The new mixed-used development due for completion by 2029.

In 2019, the station was used by 5,923,995 passengers, making it the 65th busiest of the Métro network out of 302 stations.

In 2020, the station was used by 2,449,859 passengers amidst the COVID-19 pandemic, making it the 89th busiest of the Métro network out of 304 stations.

In 2021, the station was used by 3,268,157 passengers, making it the 93rd busiest of the Métro network out of 304 stations.

== Passenger services ==
=== Access ===
The station has 5 accesses:

- Access 1: avenue Ernest Renan Parc des Expositions Halls 2 à 8
- Access 2: Palais des Sports Parc des Expositions Halls 1
- Access 3: rue de Vaugirard
- Access 4: Boulevard Victor
- Access 5: Boulevard Lefebvre

=== Station layout ===
Street Level
| B1 | Mezzanine |
| Platform level | Yard track | No regular service |
| Platform level | Island platform, doors will open on the right |
| Platform level | Southbound | ← toward Mairie d'Issy (Corentin Celton) |
| Platform level | Northbound | toward Mairie d'Aubervilliers (Convention) → |
| Platform level | Side platform, doors will open on the right |

=== Platforms ===
The station has a particular arrangement specific to the stations serving or had served as a terminus. It has 3 tracks divided amongst 1 island platform and 1 side platform. The two platforms are offset from each other by about 40 metres and are separated by a wall. Trains towards Mairie d'Aubervilliers utilise the southern track (on the side platform) whereas trains towards Mairie d'Issy utilise the central track (on the island platform). The yard track is not used in regular service and is normally used as a siding to store trains. However, it is occasionally used to terminate trains from Mairie d'Aubervilliers on weekend evenings; passengers who are heading towards Mairie d'Issy will have to wait for the next train.

=== Other connections ===
==== Tramway ====
The station has been served by tramway T3a since 16 December 2006 (as part of its initial section between Pont du Garigliano and Porte d'Ivry) and by tramway T2 since 21 November 2009 (when it was extended from Issy – Val de Seine), serving as its southern terminus. The tram station's name subtitle is shortened to Parc des Expositions. It is one of four métro stations on the network that are located at one of the former gates of Paris and are served by two tram lines; the other three are Balard (line 8), Porte de Choisy (line 7), and Porte de Vincennes (line 1). Basilique de Saint-Denis (line 13) is the only station served by two tram lines not located at one of the gates of Paris.

==== Bus ====
The station is also served by the following bus networks:

- RATP bus network: line 80
- Noctilien: lines N13, N62, and N145
- Sénart bus network: line 54
- BE Green: Traverse Brancion-Commerce

== Nearby ==
- Dôme de Paris
- Paris Expo Porte de Versailles

== Gallery ==
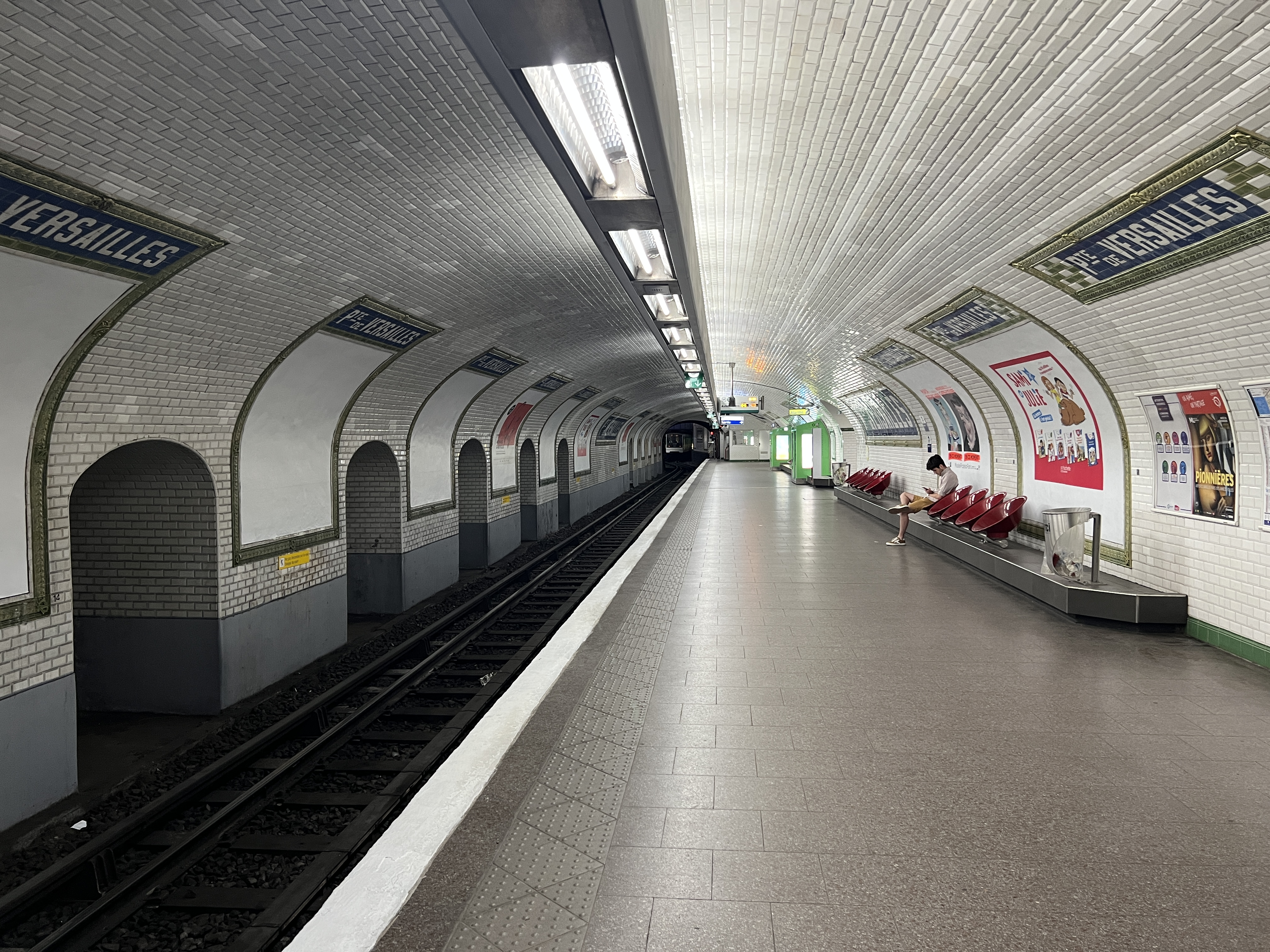
The side platform at the station

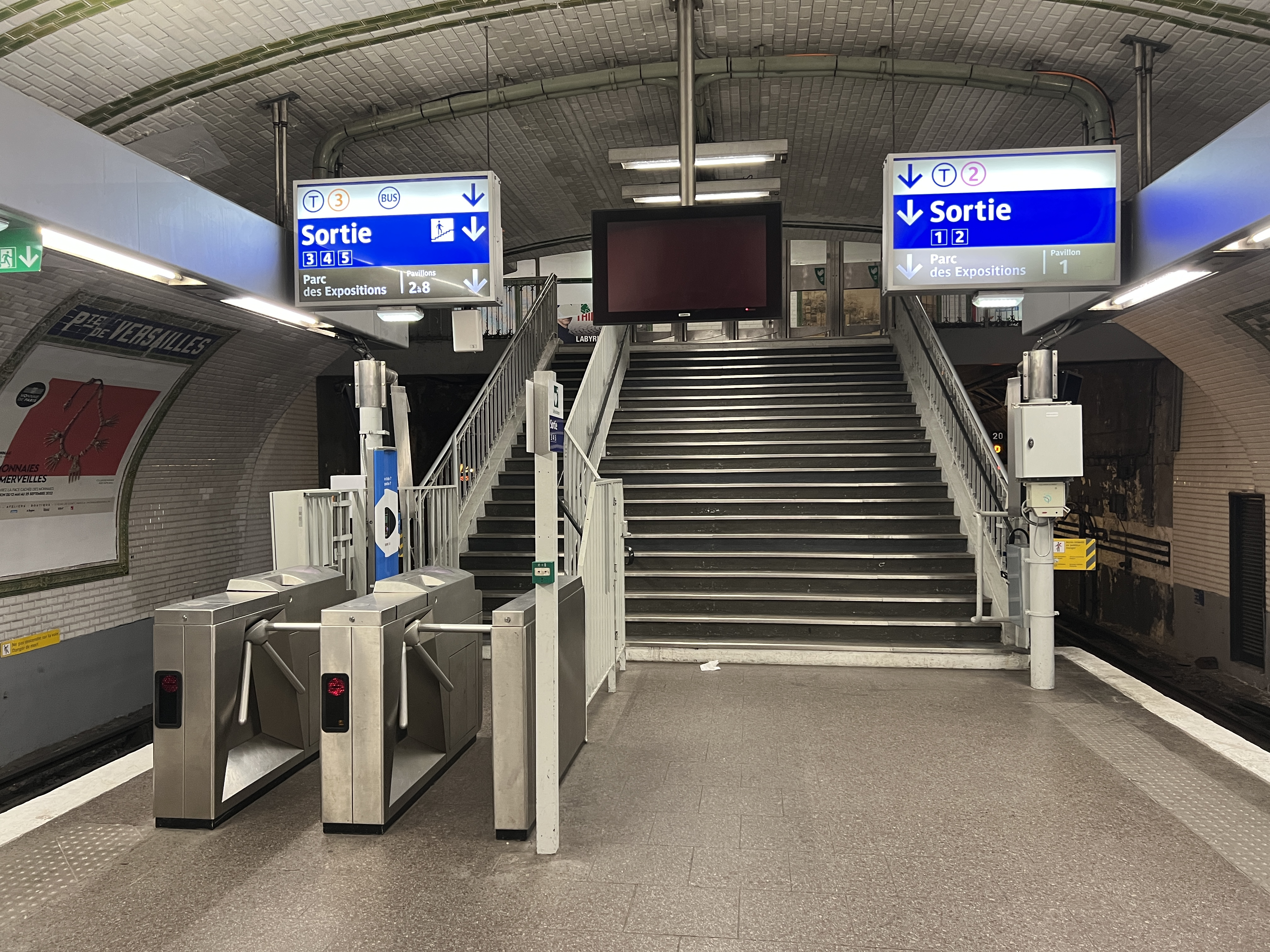
Another view of the island platform

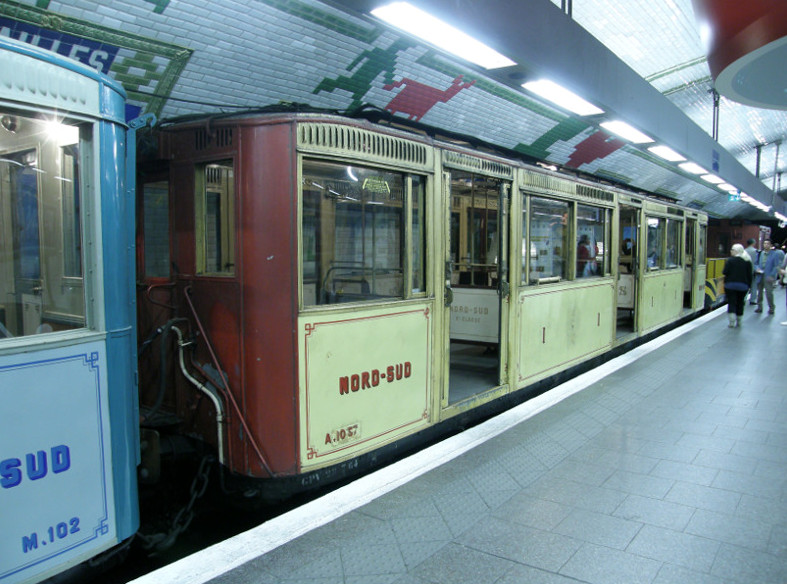
Former Nord-Sud Sprague-Thomson first class carriages at the station

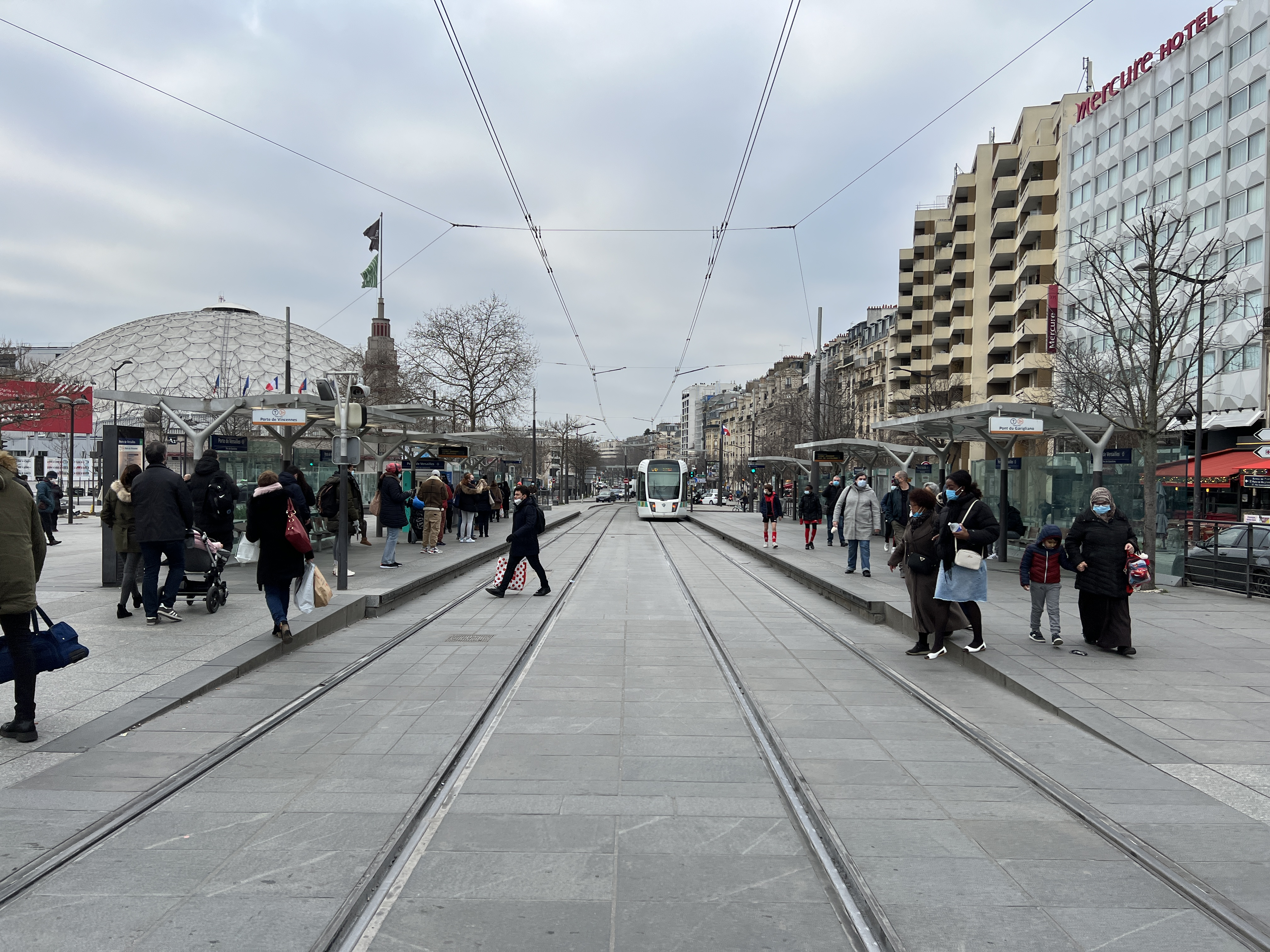
Tramway T3a stop

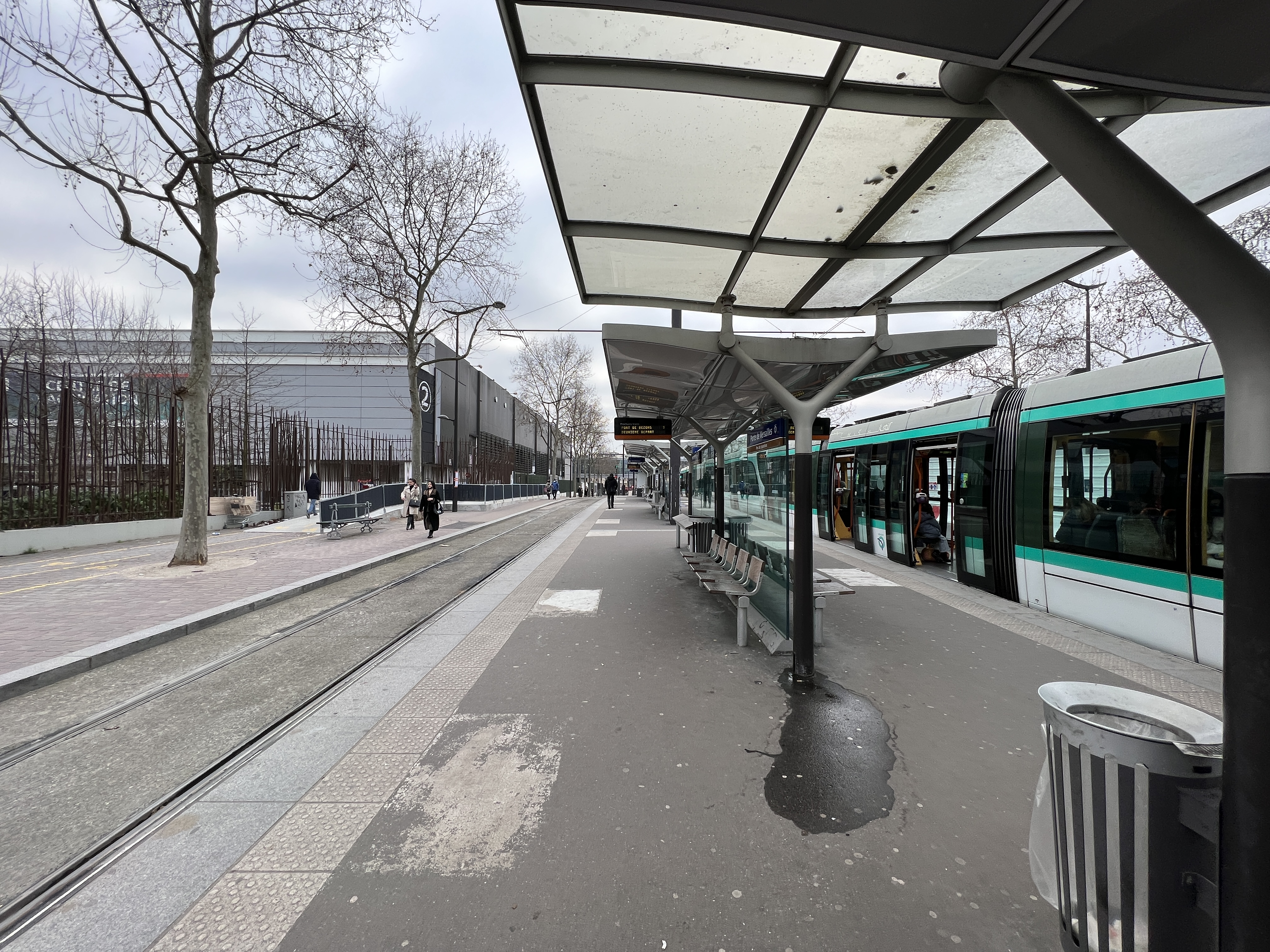
Tramway T2 terminus

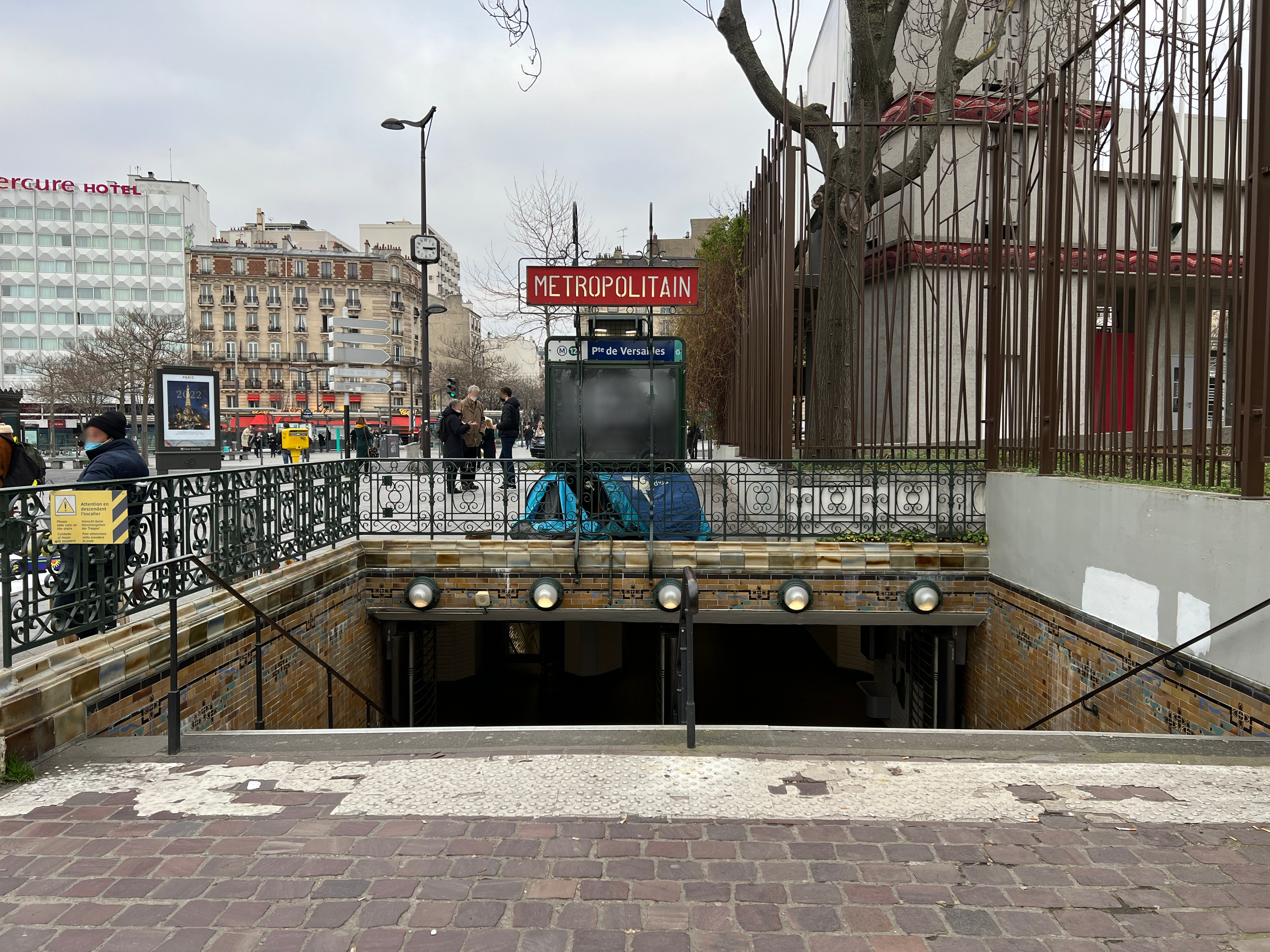
Access 1

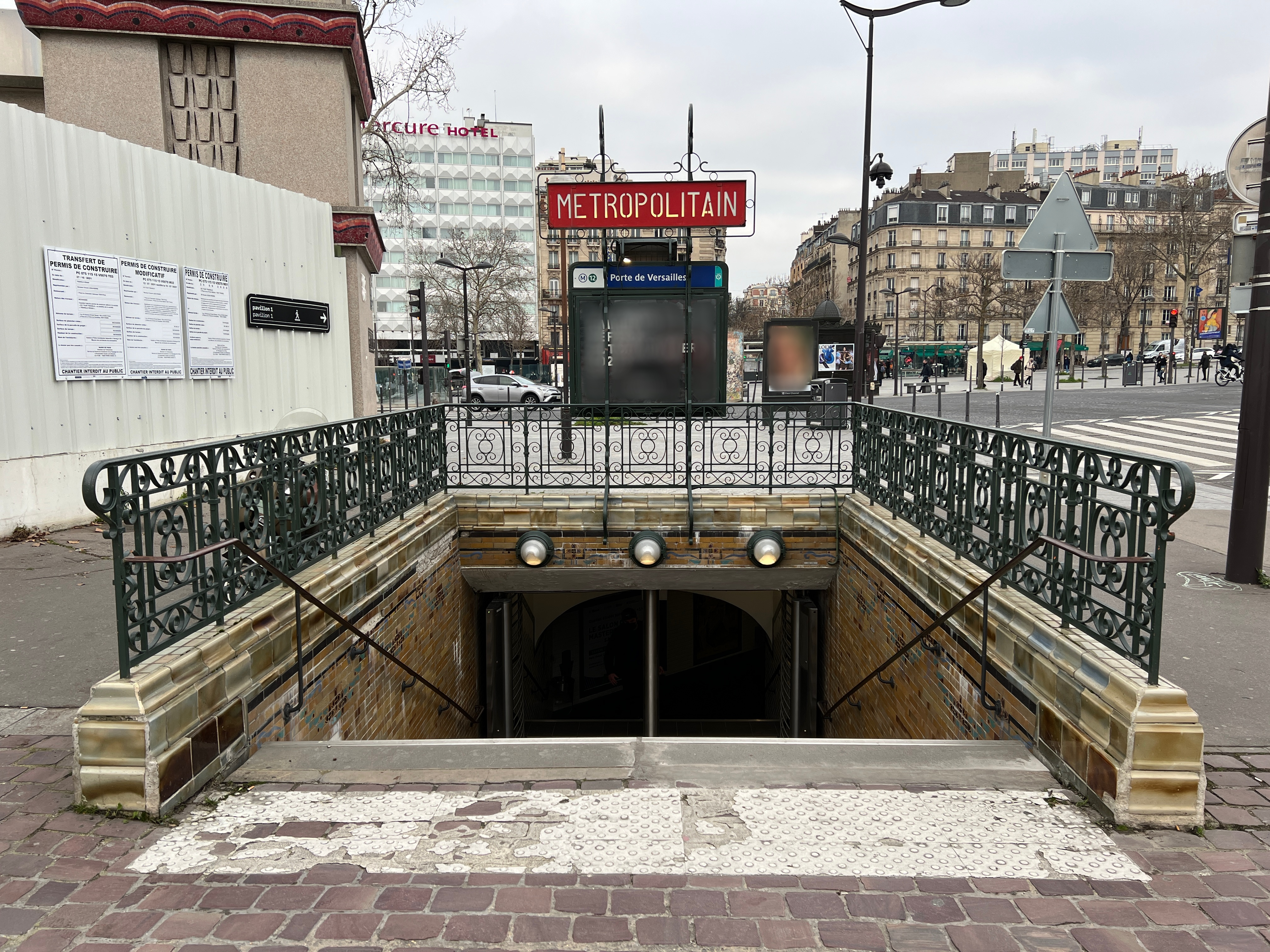
Access 2

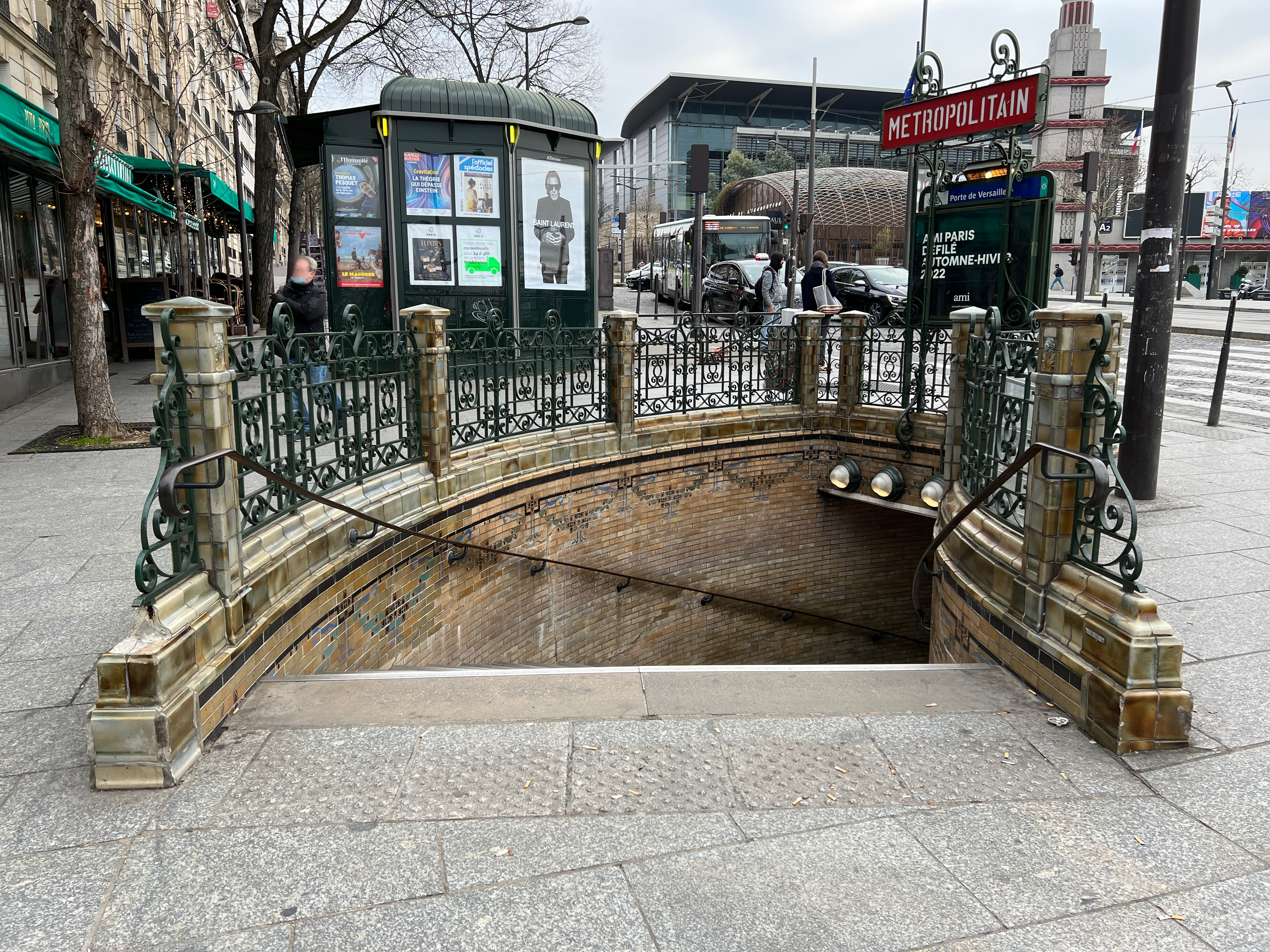
Access 3

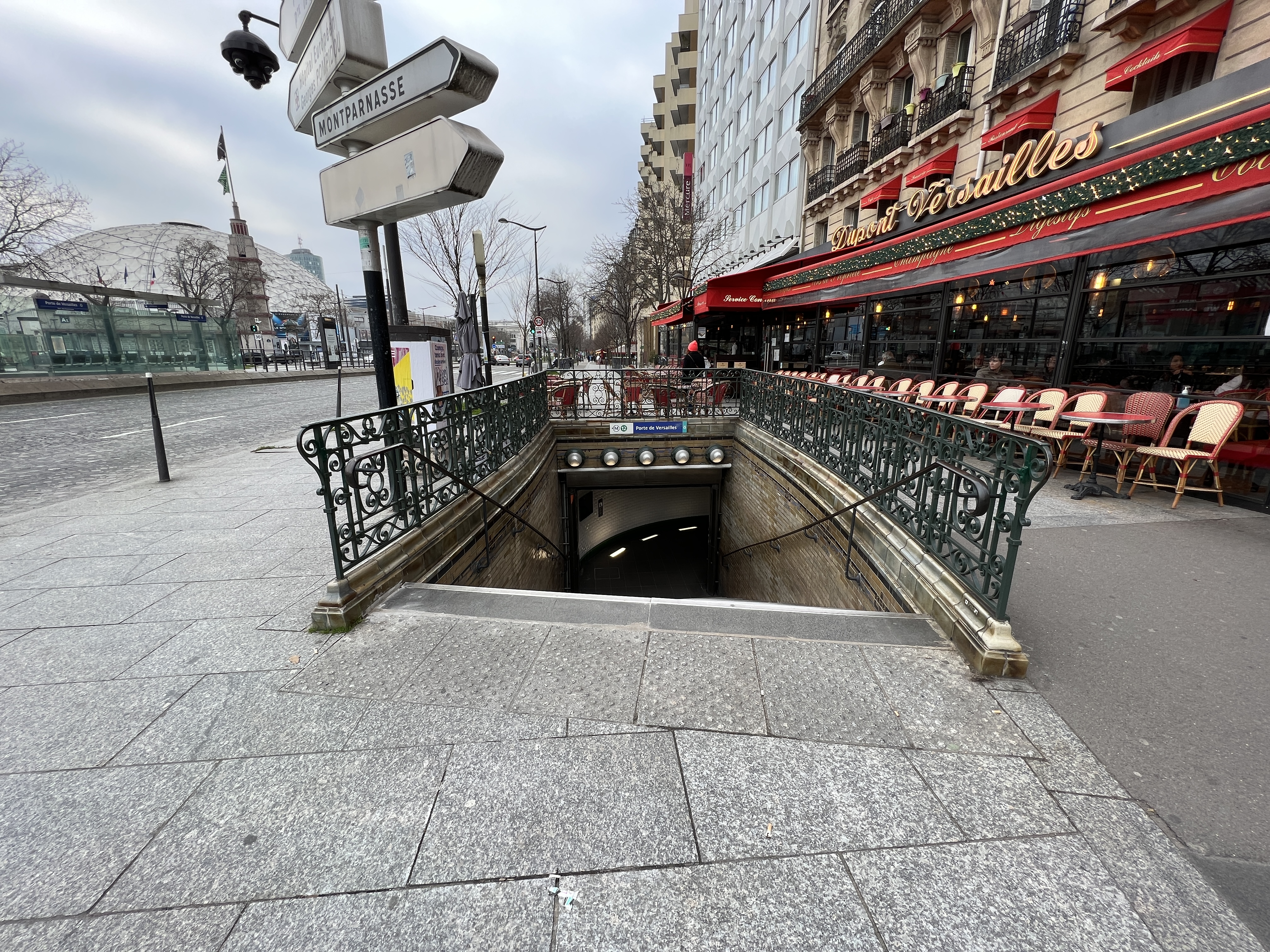
Access 4

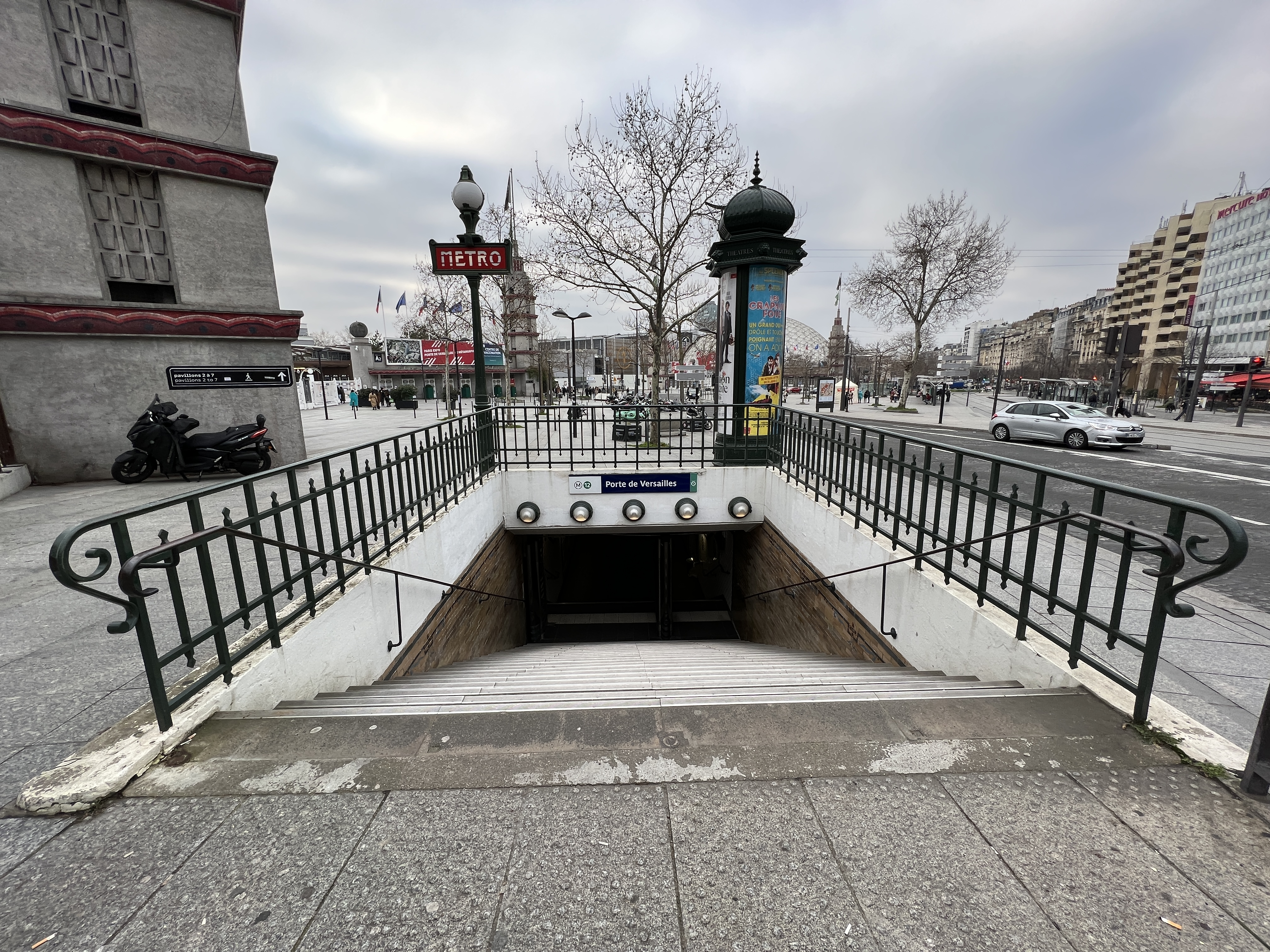
Access 5
