= Val de Seine =

Business district southwest of Paris

Coordinates: 48°49′54″N 2°15′53″E

The Val de Seine (French pronunciation: [val də sɛn]; lit. 'Vale of Seine') is one of the most important business districts of the Paris agglomeration. Located southwest of the city, it spreads along a bend of the Seine, mainly in the municipalities of Boulogne-Billancourt and Issy-les-Moulineaux and in the 15th arrondissement of Paris.

The district, dominated by industry during most of the 20th century, has specialized since the 1980s in communication activities and today it is the most important business district of the Paris agglomeration in that field. The Val de Seine contains the headquarters of most major French TV networks, including TF1, France Télévisions, Arte, Canal+, TPS, Eurosport and France 24.

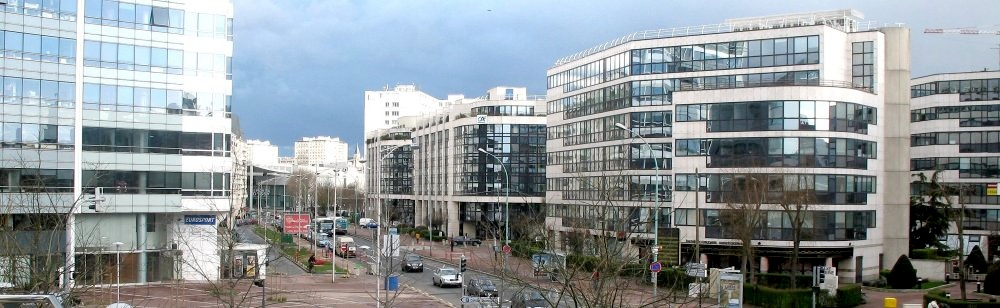
View from Issy–Val de Seine station on RER C

== Transport ==
The nearest railway stations are Pont du Garigliano and Issy–Val de Seine on RER C.

== See also ==
- La Defense
