= Île-de-France tramway Line 2 =

Tram line in Paris, Hauts-de-Seine and Val-d'Oise

Coordinates: 48.8431°N 2.2219°E

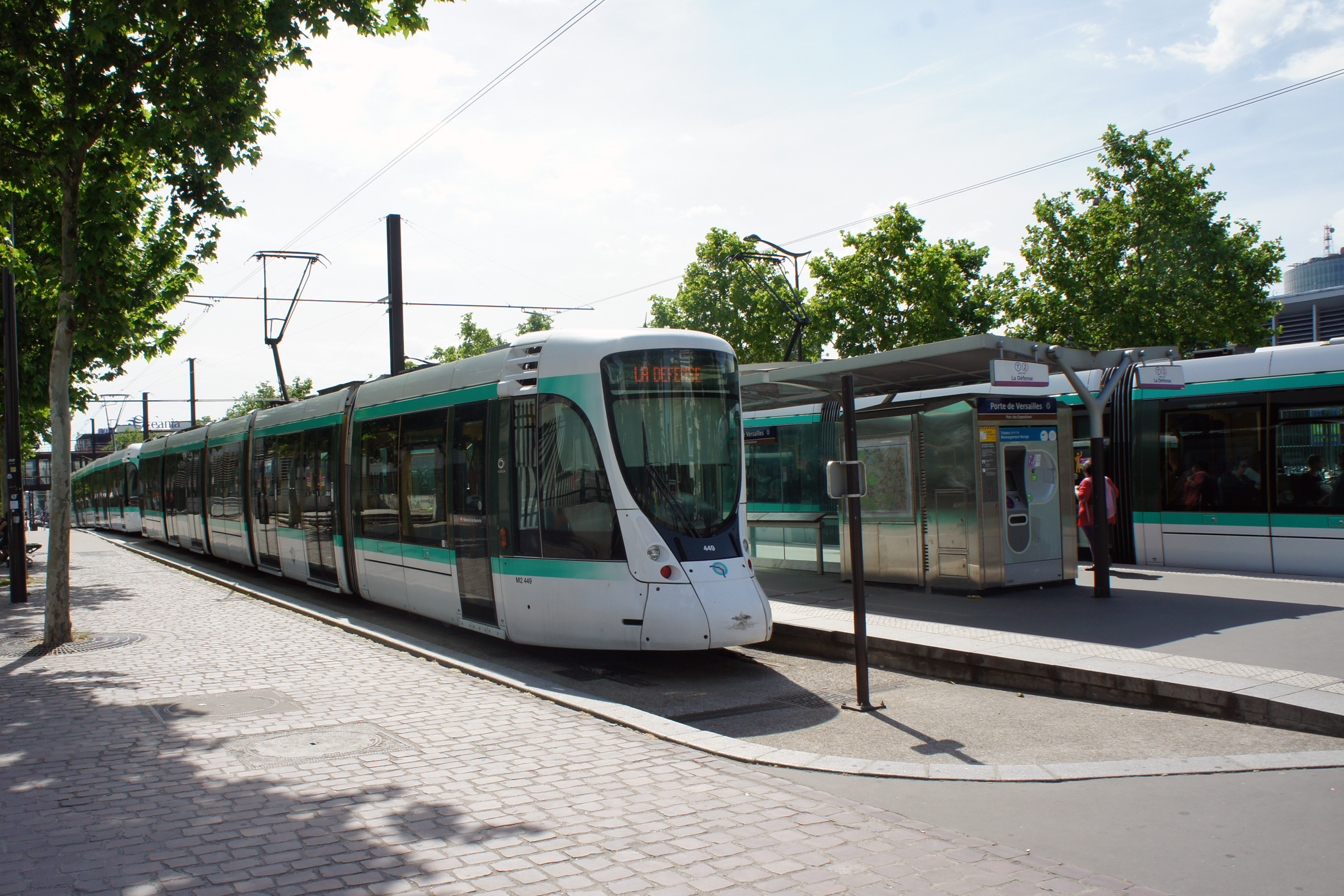
- Île-de-France tramway Line 2 at the Porte de Versailles terminus

Overview
- Owner: Île-de-France Mobilités
- Termini: Pont de Bezons; Porte de Versailles
- Stations: 24

Service
- Type: Tram
- System: Tramways in Île-de-France
- Operator: RATP Group
- Rolling stock: 66 Alstom Citadis
- Ridership: Approx. 20 million journeys per year

History
- Opened: 2 July 1997; 29 years ago
- Last extension: 19 November 2012

Technical
- Line length: 17.9 km (11.1 mi)
- Track gauge: 1,435 mm (4 ft 8 1/2 in) standard gauge
Route map

Île-de-France tramway Line 2 (T2; French: Ligne 2 du tramway d'Île-de-France) is part of the modern tram network of the Île-de-France region of France. It connects the commune of Bezons in the north to the Porte de Versailles Métro station in Paris in the south, serving Hauts-de-Seine and its La Défense business district. It is one of the busiest tram lines in France.

The line has been operated by the RATP since its opening, under the authority of Île-de-France Mobilités (IDFM). Future operation of line will become subject to a competitive bidding process in November 2029.

The line has a length of 17.9 km (11.1 mi) and 24 stations. The initial section between La Défense station and Issy–Val de Seine station opened in July 1997, uses a former heavy rail line converted into light rail (Ligne de Puteaux à Issy-Plaine), whereas the further extensions on both ends opened in November 2009 and November 2012 feature segregated on-street running. The line is particularly scenic between Parc de Saint-Cloud and Musée de Sèvres stations, as it runs along the Seine.

== History ==
=== Chronology ===
- 2 July 1997: Commissioning of first section between La Défense and Issy-Val de Seine
- 2000: Order for sixty Citadis 302 trains is announced
- 2 December 2002: Commercial commissioning of the first Citadis 302 trains
- 2003: transfer of standard French Tramway (TFS) trains to tramway line 1
- September 2003 to October 2004: Periodic circulation of a historic engine of the Vienna tramway
- 5 September 2005: Putting double-length trains into circulation
- 21 November 2009: Extension towards the south from Issy-Val de Seine to Porte de Versailles
- 19 November 2012: Extension towards the north from La Défense to Pont de Bezons

=== The Molineaux Line ===
Line 2 of the Île-de-France tramway uses the former Puteaux to Issy-Plaine line (also known as the Ligne des Moulineaux and the Ligne des Coteaux, for most of its route (10 kilometres (6.2 mi) out of 17.9 km). It was opened on 1 May 1889, just in time for the Universal Exposition of 1889, it took the form of a branch line from Paris-Saint-Lazare to Versailles-Rive-Droite, originating in Puteaux and ending at the Champ de Mars in Paris, at the foot of the flagship work of the Exhibition, the Eiffel Tower, before having its terminus moved back to Issy-Plaine.

The Moulineaux line suffered from a lack of investment, making it one of the most outdated lines in the Paris suburbs, with very poor performance, despite being located near the futuristic La Défense district. This situation persisted until its closure on 21 May 1993, in order to allow its transformation into a tram line, the present T2.

== Route ==
=== Communes served ===
Line 2 serves the communes of Bezons (one stop), Colombes (three stops), La Garenne-Colombes (two stops), Courbevoie (one stop), Puteaux (two stops), Suresnes (two stops), Saint-Cloud (three stops), Sèvres (one stop), Meudon (two stops), Issy-les-Moulineaux (three stops) and Paris (four stops).

=== Places of interest ===
The line allows visitors to access the Grande Arche in La Défense, the Parc de Saint-Cloud at the eponym stop, the Manufacture nationale de Sèvres at Musée de Sèvres and Paris expo Porte de Versailles at its southern terminus.

== Rolling stock ==
Line 2 is operated by the Régie autonome des transports parisiens (RATP) under the authority of Île-de-France Mobilités (IDFM). The line's success (115,000 people use it daily) led to its Tramway Français Standard (TFS) rolling stock to be replaced starting in 2002 by Alstom Citadis trams; the TFS rolling stock was transferred to Île-de-France tramway Line 1 to increase its capacity.

As the Citadis trams also rapidly proved insufficient in terms of size, they were doubled in length in 2005 by using a Scharfenberg coupler, raising the capacity of each tram to 440 passengers. Several stops were also therefore doubled in length. With the extension to Porte de Versailles and the line crossing several intersections, the RATP had each tram's front and rear coupler covered, so that in the event of a collision with a pedestrian, the damage sustained by the person would be less severe.

== Gallery ==
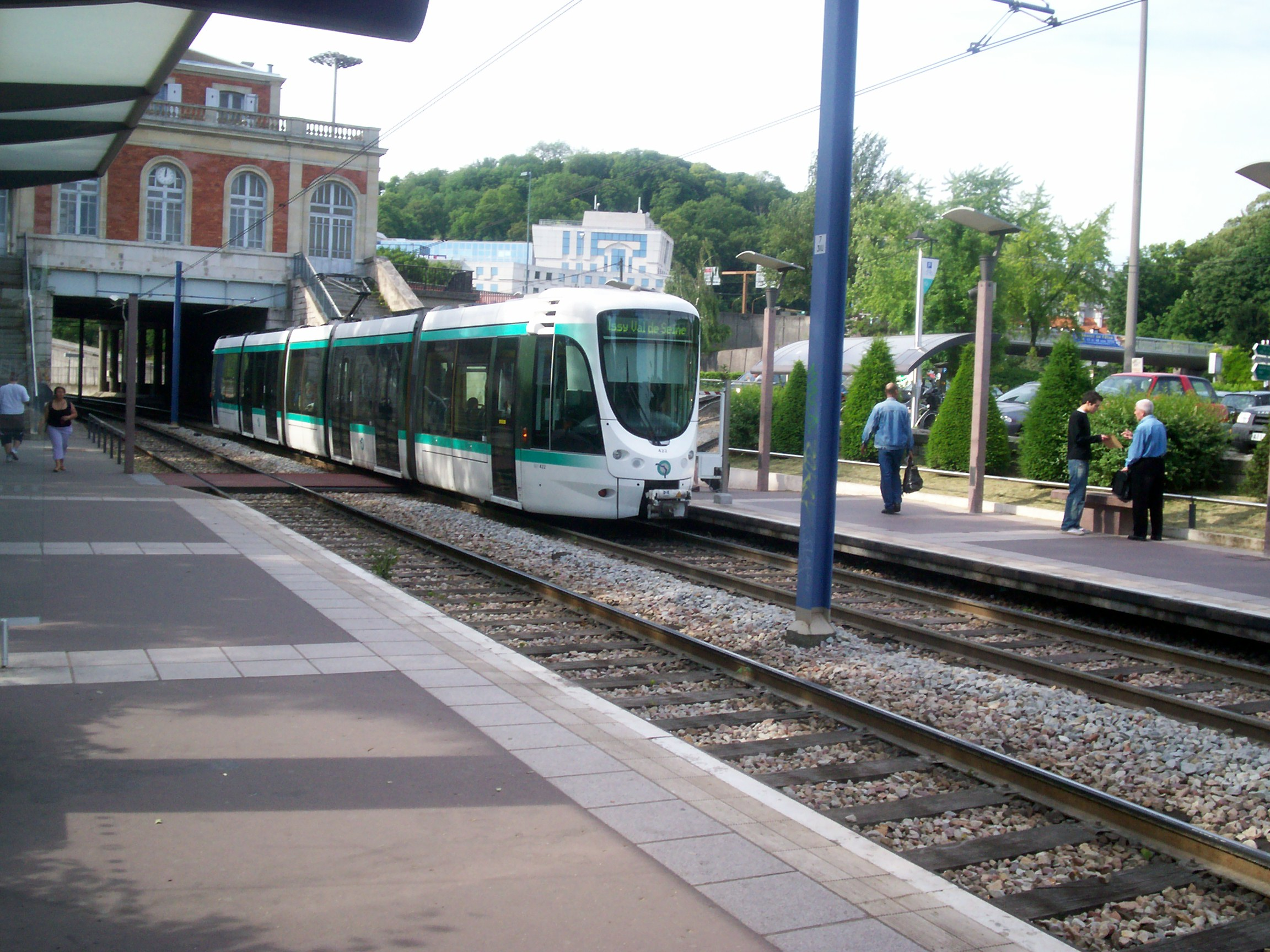
Non-covered coupler (2006)

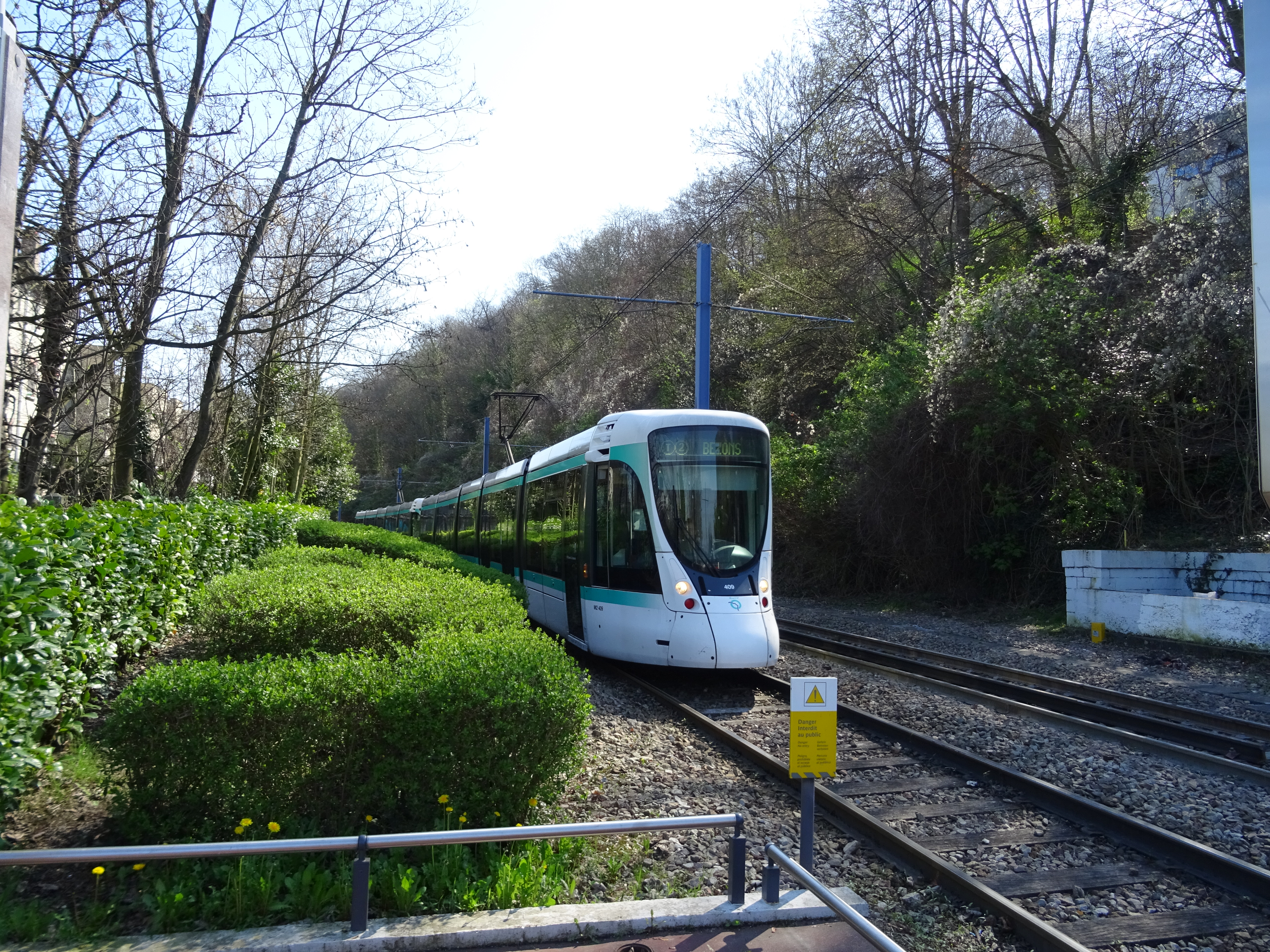
Tram arriving at Brimborion station

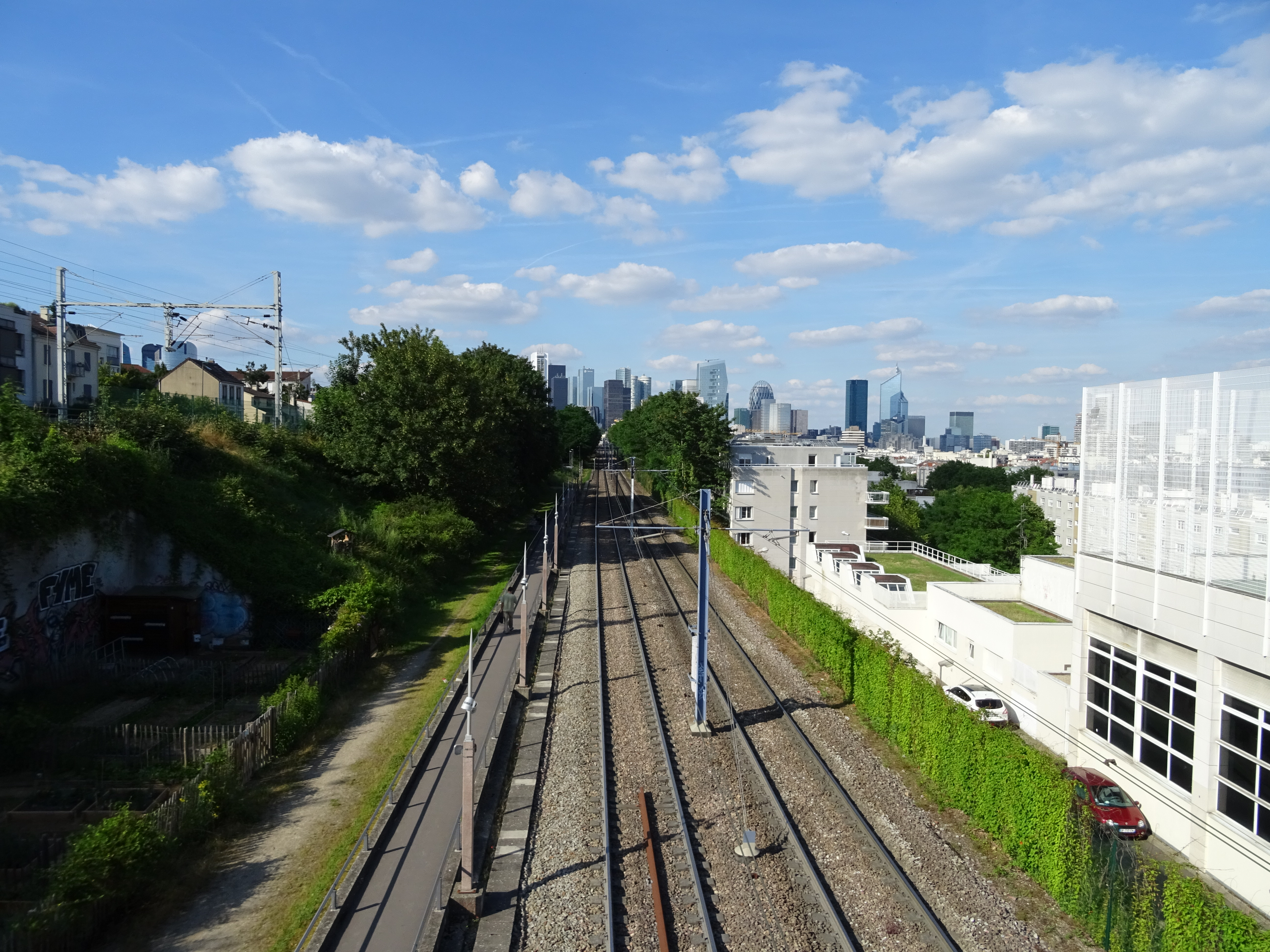
Tracks towards La Défense

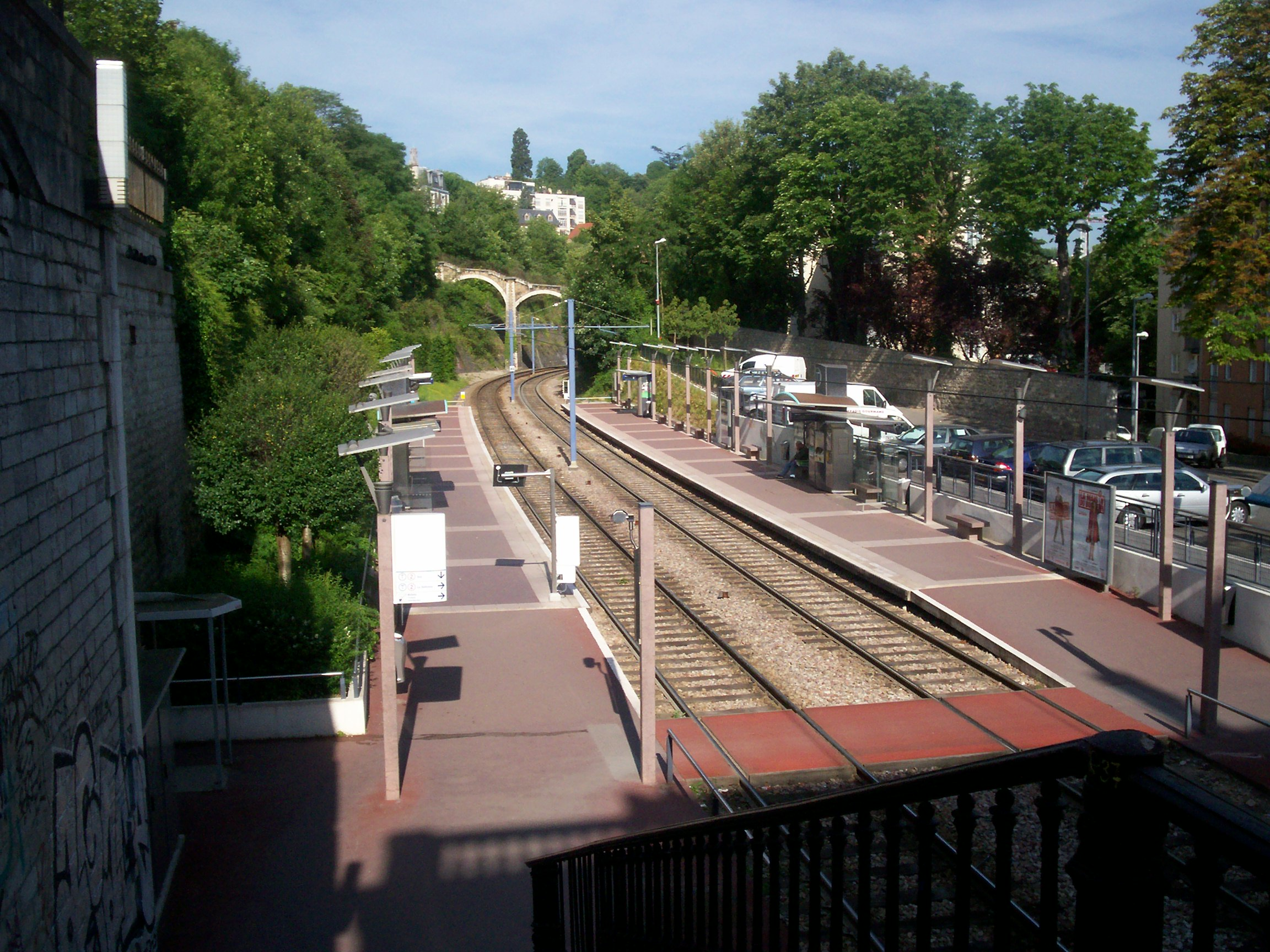
Meudon-sur-Seine station

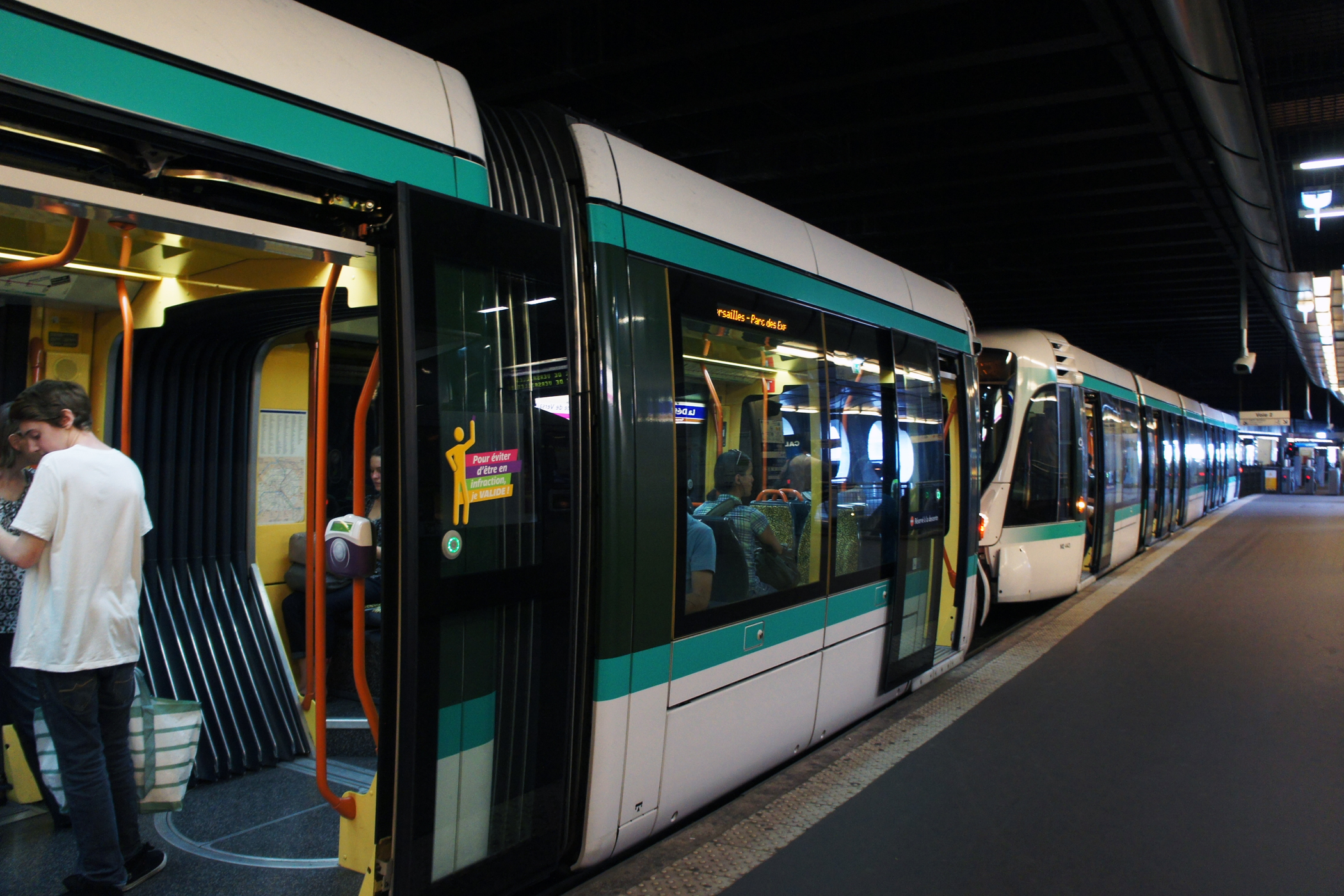
Line 2 tram at La Défense station
