= Issy–Val de Seine station =

French railway station

Issy–Val de Seine
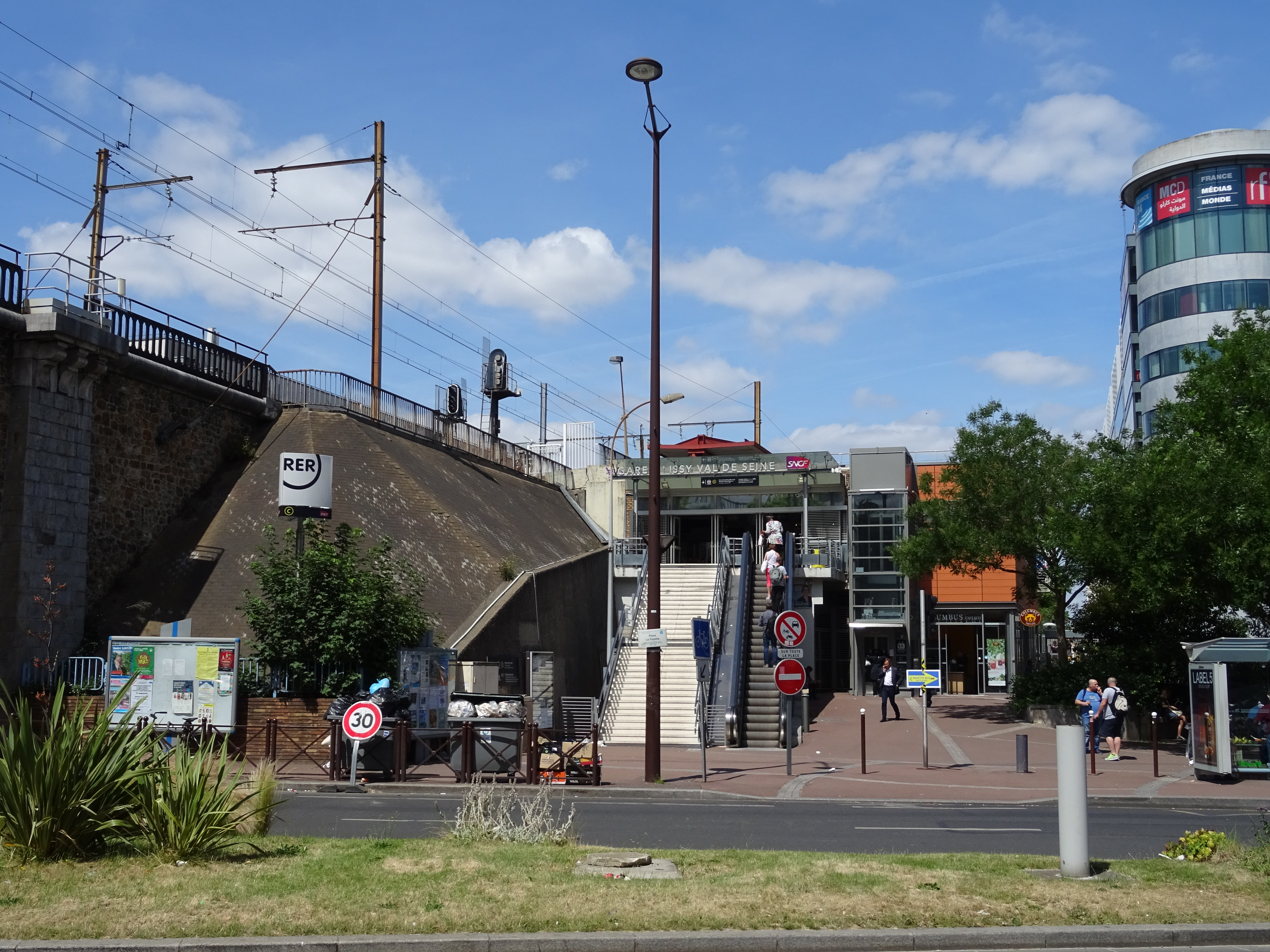
- Station entrance

General information
- Location: Issy-les-Moulineaux, Hauts-de-Seine, Île-de-France, France
- Coordinates: 48°49′47″N 2°15′47″E
- Line: RER C

Other information
- Station code: 87393306

Passengers
- 2024: 5,637,600

Services
Preceding station	RER	Following station
Issy towards Versailles Château Rive Gauche or Saint-Quentin-en-Yvelines	RER C	Pont du Garigliano towards Massy-Palaiseau, Dourdan-la-Forêt or Saint-Martin-d'Étampes
Preceding station	Tram	Following station
Jacques-Henri Lartigue towards Pont de Bezons	T2	Henri Farman towards Porte de Versailles
Location

Issy–Val de Seine (French pronunciation: [isi val də sɛn]; lit. 'Issy–Vale of Seine') is one of two railway stations in Issy-les-Moulineaux (along with Issy) just southwest of Paris, in the Hauts-de-Seine department. It is on the Invalides–Versailles-Rive-Gauche line, served by RER C (branches C5 and C7). The station serves the Val de Seine business district.

It provides an interchange with Île-de-France tramway Line 2 (on the former Puteaux–Issy-Plaine line). It was the southern terminus of the tram line between 1997 and 2009, when it was extended eastwards to Porte de Versailles in Paris.

== Service ==
In rush hours, the station is served by 12 trains per hour; in off-peak hours, it is served by 6 trains per hour.

== Gallery ==
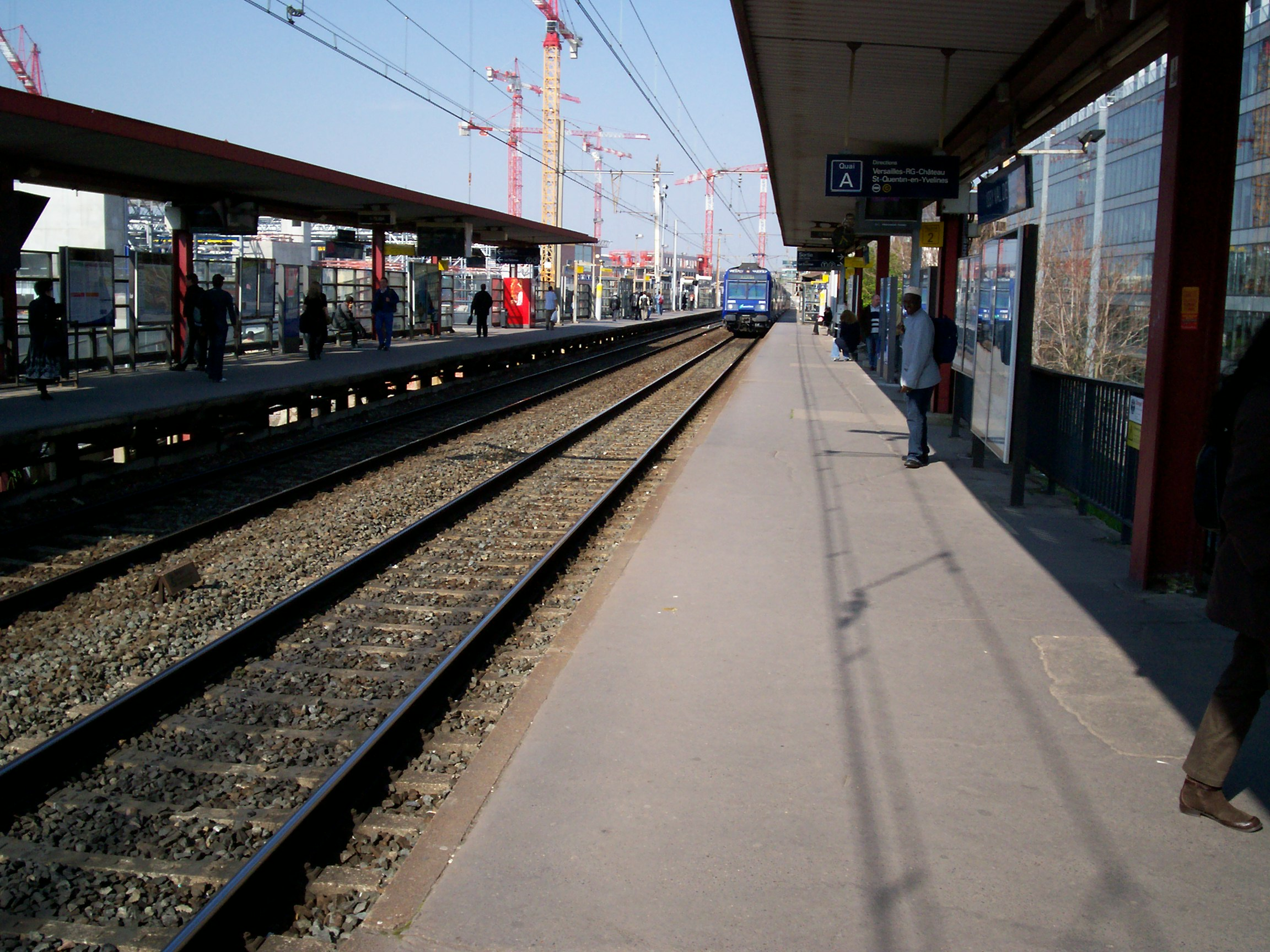
Platforms.

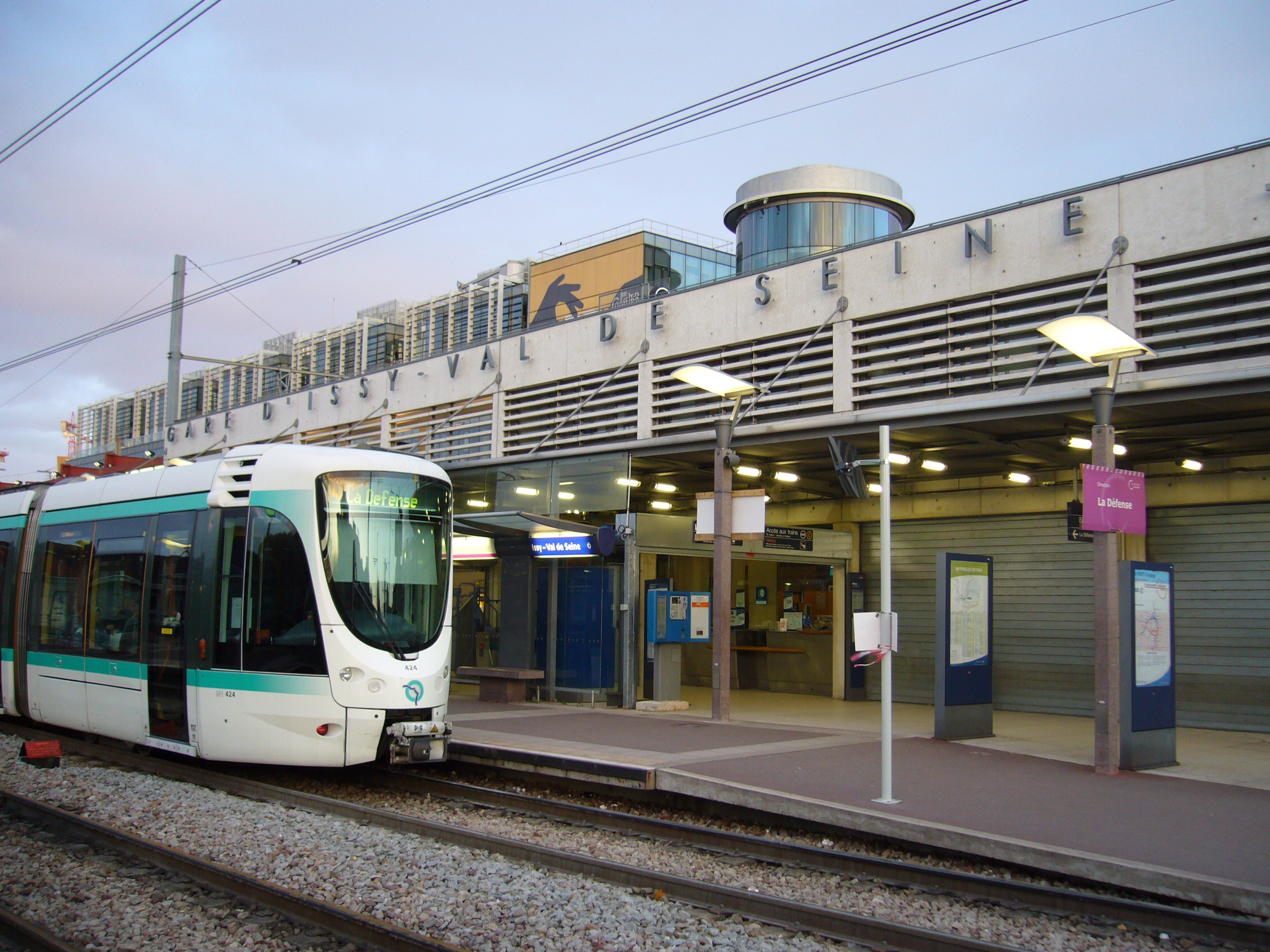
Tram stop with entrance the RER station behind

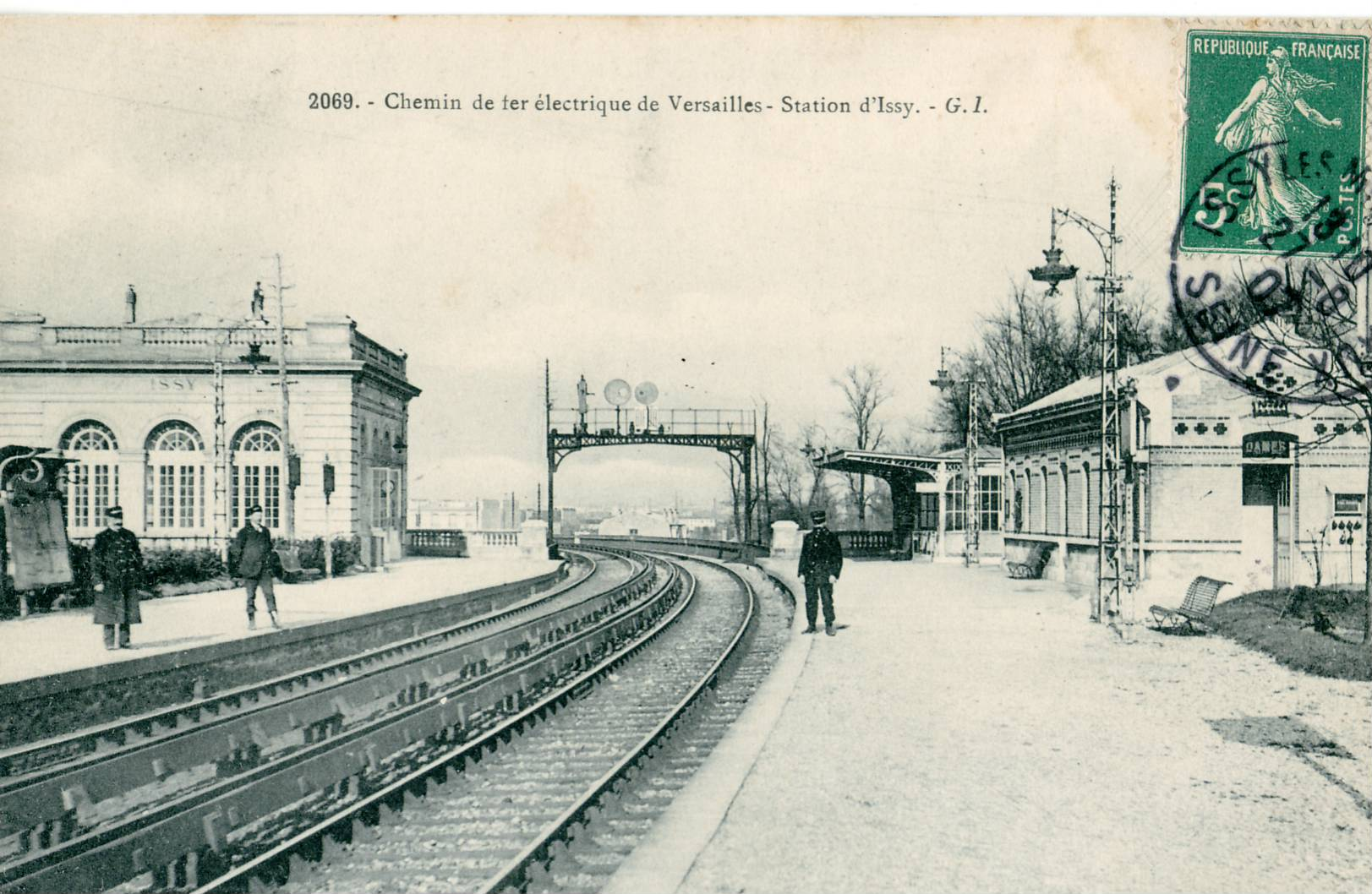
The station in 1907

== See also ==
- List of stations of the Paris RER
