= Pumpido =

Pumpido is a surname. Notable people with the surname include:

- Cándido Conde-Pumpido (born 1949), Spanish judge
- Facundo Pumpido (born 1988), Argentine footballer, nephew of Nery
- Nery Pumpido (born 1957), Argentine footballer and coach

== See also ==
- Pompidou (disambiguation)
