= Pompadour =

Pompadour may refer to:

- Madame de Pompadour (1721–1764), Jeanne-Antoinette Poisson, Marquise de Pompadour, mistress of King Louis XV
- Pompadour (hairstyle), a combed hairstyle that takes its name from Madame de Pompadour
- Pompadour fish (or discus), a genus of fish native to the Amazon river basin
- Arnac-Pompadour (or simply Pompadour), a commune of the Corrèze department of France
  - Pompadour station, a railway station on the Nexon–Brive line
- The Pompadours, a nickname for the 56th (West Essex) Regiment of Foot
- A shade of pink
- A type of fabric produced by warp printing

== See also ==
- Madame Pompadour (disambiguation)
