= Boris Fraenkel =

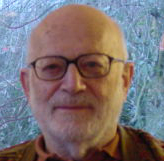
Boris Fraenkel

Boris Fraenkel (1921, Free City of Danzig - 23 April 2006, Pont du Garigliano, Paris) was a Communist politician active in French and international politics.

== Biography ==
=== To 1950 ===
Fraenkel was born to Jewish parents in 1921 in Danzig (then an independent territory, thus allowing him a stateless status) now in northern Poland. He began by fighting for extreme-left Zionism under Hashomer Hatzair, where Marxist ideology mixed with Jewish nationalism. Arriving in France in 1938, to study agriculture at Nancy, he moved to study chemistry and in 1940 joined his mother at Grenoble, where he just missed being raided by the Gestapo. He then fled to Switzerland and was interned in the Gierenbad camp in Zürich, where he met the novelist and philosopher Manès Sperber, the future Racine specialist, Lucien Goldmann, and Aby Wieviorka, a major translator from Yiddish in Paris. Despite the very difficult conditions, he managed to take a course in political economy in the camp and there for the first time in a clandestine cell of a Trotskyist party, joining with Jost von Steiger (nephew of conseiller fédéral Eduard von Steiger, then chef du département de Justice et Police). Expelled from Switzerland in 1949 for participating to a conference on Marxism and Judaism, he was assigned to the French police at Grenoble. He then took several jobs, such as secretary to the painter Sonia Delaunay and as an organiser for CEMEA, where he met his wife Denise Salomon.

=== 1950–79 ===
An "intellectual without a work", Fraenkel passed his life reading, translating and popularising theses by authors such as Reich, Marcuse ("Eros et Civilisation"), Lukács, and Trotsky. He met the philosopher Herbert Marcuse, with whom he had an intellectual conversation marked by mutual respect. Organiser of the Partisans review, edited by François Maspero, he was one of the founders of the Internationalist Communist Organisation in 1958 at the time of the Trotskyite secession. He was expelled from it in 1966 by Pierre Boussel alias Lambert, for having published texts by Wilhelm Reich without having gained the copyright for them.

In 1966, he translated the La Lutte sexuelle des jeunes (Young people's sexual struggle) with Jean-Marie Brohm, announcing one of the themes highlighted in May 1968. On 22 March 1967, at Nanterre, he set up a conference entitled Jeunesse et sexualité (Youth and Sexuality) within the university, marked by its successes in May 1968. On 9 June 1968 the police tried to expel him to West Germany, which refused to take him and denied him German nationality since his birthplace of Danzig no longer existed as a state. He found himself put under house arrest at Sarlat in Dordogne (he was freed thanks to a protest campaign launched by François Maspero). To accelerate his release, Denise married him on 25 December 1969. In the course of the 1970s he began to retire.

During the 1960s and '70s Fraenkel crossed the path of many persons who became public personalities - politicians such as Alain Krivine and Lionel Jospin, university lecturers such as Jean-Marie Brohm and Georges Vigarello, as well as many journalists.

=== 2001–06 ===
Fraenkel re-appeared in public life in 2001, when he affected the French presidential campaign by revealing (as he had already done in 1997) Lionel Jospin's Trotskyite past. Jospin had been introduced to him by Robert Lacondemine, one of his comrades in Dugny's cell (other members were Fraenkel, Denise and the historian Pierre Broué, who located him at a wedding in Burgundy and referred to Fraenkel as "a young intellectual with a happy air who joined the ENA").

Fraenkel told the Nouvel Observateur:

It was slightly my speciality: to locate young people of the left and have them fall into my nets, as my comrades put it. Jospin was then a student at ENA. I moulded him secretly. We did not then have a graduate of the École nationale d'administration in the movement. It was an extraordinary chance to infiltrate high public office. When I recruited Jospin, only Lambert and I knew he was in the organisation. I even thought that Lambert did not know I had been in the circuit.

In 2002 he decided to join the Ligue communiste révolutionnaire "to break his isolation", but was disappointed by it and did not long remain a member.

Boris Fraenkel committed suicide on 23 April 2006 by jumping into the Seine from a bridge near Gare de Lyon. His body was found two days later at the level of the 8e arrondissement de Paris.

== Bibliography ==
- (in French) Thomas Munzer, Pour Wilhelm Reich par Boris Fraenkel. Sexualité et travail, Éditions Maspero (1968).
- (in French) Boris Fraenkel, Sonia Combe, Antoine Spire, Profession: Révolutionnaire, Collection Clair & Net. Éditions Le Bord de L'eau, 29 March 2004, ISBN 2-911803-90-6
