= Île-de-France tramway lines 3a and 3b =

Tram lines in Paris

Map of tramway Lines 3a (shown in orange) and 3b (shown in green)

Île-de-France tramway lines 3a and 3b (French: Lignes 3a et 3b du tramway d'Île-de-France) are the first modern tramway in Paris proper since the 1937 closure of the previous comparable system. They are operated by RATP and divided into two sections called T3a and T3b. The line is also known as the Tramway des Maréchaux because it follows the Boulevards of the Marshals, a series of boulevards that encircle Paris along the route of the former Thiers Wall (built from 1841 to 1844). The boulevards are, with three exceptions, named for Napoleon's First Empire marshals (maréchaux); they were transformed by redevelopment works carried out during the two-and-a-half-year construction of the line, which opened on 16 December 2006 under the designation T3.

The line initially ran in its own section of these boulevards' roadway between the 15th and 13th arrondissements, allowing it to connect the Pont du Garigliano and Porte d'Ivry in an average of 26 minutes. It carried 25 million passengers in its first year of operation, averaging 100,000 on weekdays and 70,000 on weekends; numbers have steadily increased ever since. In 2009, further work began to extend the line to the northeast, with the extension fully opening on 15 December 2012. Two separate lines were constructed to ensure the service's reliability: the existing line was extended to Porte de Vincennes and renamed T3a; a second line (T3b) initially connected Porte de Vincennes to Porte de la Chapelle. An extension of the latter to Porte d'Asnières near the border with Levallois-Perret opened on 24 November 2018.

The lines have been operated by the RATP since opening, under the authority of Île-de-France Mobilités. Future operation of lines will become subject to a competitive bidding process in November 2029.

== T3a ==
Île-de-France tramway Line T3a

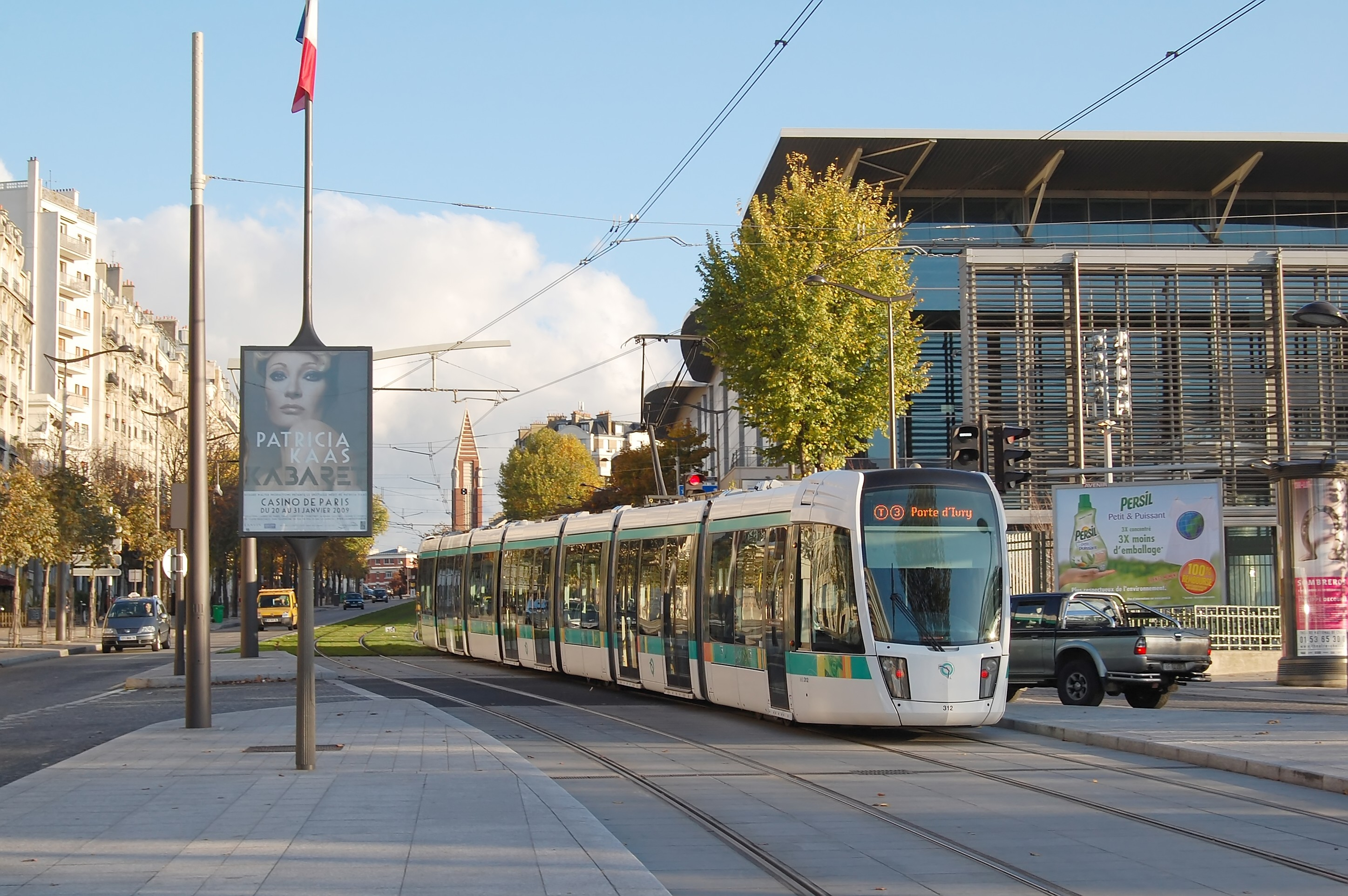
- Île-de-France tramway Line T3a near Porte de Versailles station

Overview
- Owner: Île-de-France Mobilités
- Termini: Porte de Vincennes; Pont du Garigliano
- Stations: 25

Service
- Type: Tram
- System: Tramways in Île-de-France
- Operator: RATP Group
- Rolling stock: 63 Alstom Citadis 402 (shared with T3b)

History
- Opened: 16 December 2006; 19 years ago
- Last extension: 15 December 2012

Technical
- Line length: 12.4 km (7.7 mi)
- Track gauge: 1,435 mm (4 ft 8 1/2 in) standard gauge
Route map

T3a connects Pont du Garigliano–Hôpital européen Georges-Pompidou station in the western part of the 15th arrondissement with Porte de Vincennes station in the 12th arrondissement. The line carries 112,000 people per day.

The first section, between Pont du Garigliano and Porte d'Ivry, opened as T3 on 16 December 2006. Work began in early 2009 on a 14.5 kilometres (9.0 mi) extension from Porte d'Ivry to Porte de la Chapelle, via Porte de Charenton. The extension project was then split into a smaller extension to Porte de Vincennes and a separate tramway line for the remainder of the route, which became T3a. The opening of the extension and renaming to T3a occurred on 15 December 2012.

== T3b ==
Île-de-France tramway Line T3b

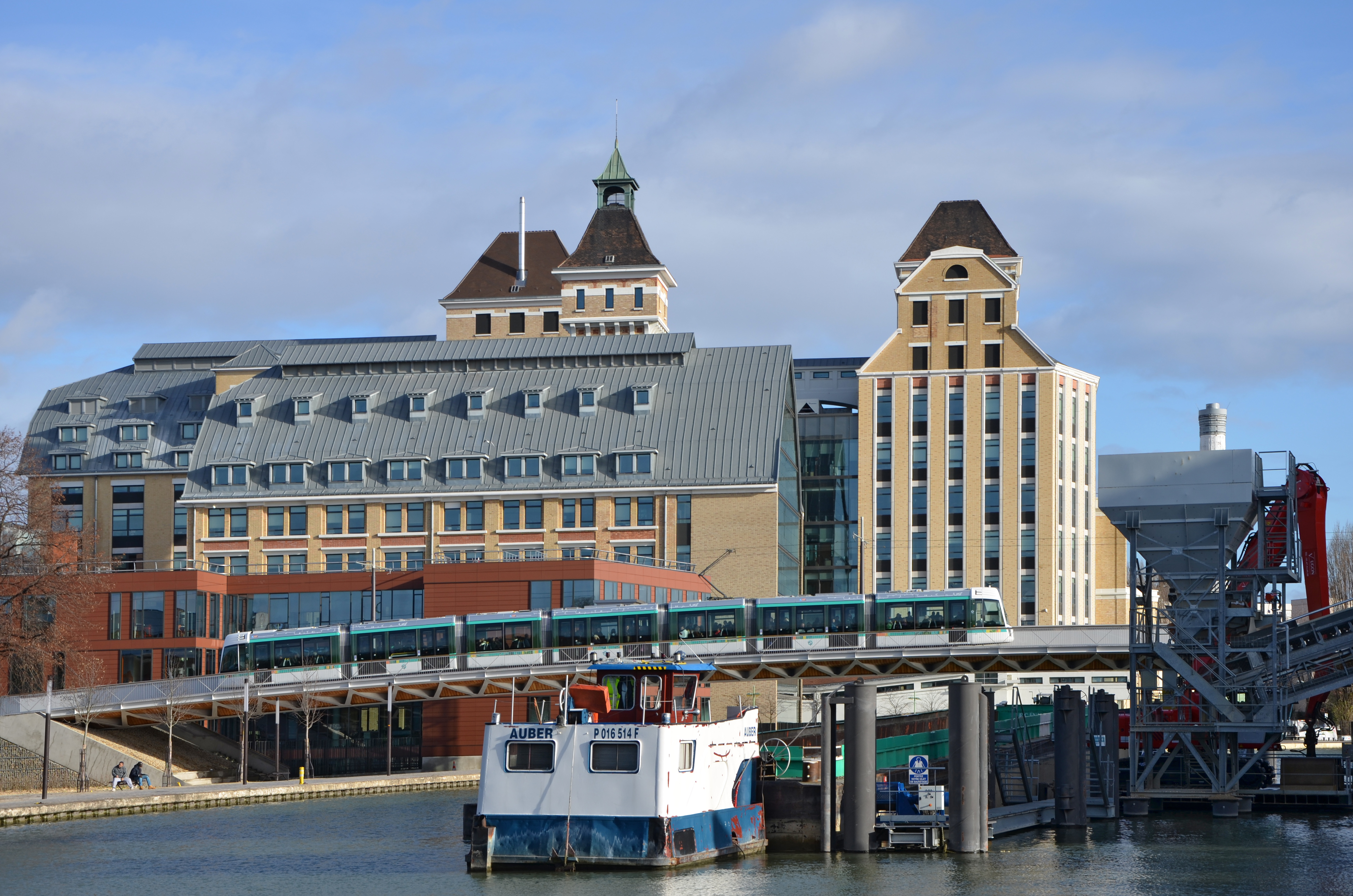
- Île-de-France tramway Line T3b crosses the Ourcq Canal

Overview
- Owner: Île-de-France Mobilités
- Termini: Porte Dauphine; Porte de Vincennes
- Stations: 33

Service
- Type: Tram
- System: Tramways in Île-de-France
- Operator: RATP Group
- Rolling stock: 63 Alstom Citadis 402 (shared with T3a)

History
- Opened: 15 December 2012; 13 years ago
- Last extension: 5 April 2024

Technical
- Line length: 17.5 km (10.9 mi)
- Track gauge: 1,435 mm (4 ft 8 1/2 in) standard gauge
Route map

T3b initially connected Porte de Vincennes with Porte de la Chapelle in the 18th arrondissement. It opened concurrently with the extension of T3a to Porte de Vincennes on 15 December 2012. The line was extended to Porte d'Asnières—Marguerite Long in the 17th arrondissement on 24 November 2018.

A further extension with seven stops towards Porte Dauphine in the 16th arrondissement just east of the Bois de Boulogne started service on 5 April 2024. It connects with Métro Line 3 at Porte de Champerret, Métro Line 1, RER A and RER E at Porte Maillot, and Métro Line 2 at its new terminus.

== History ==
=== Timeline ===
- 16 December 2006: opens between Pont du Garigliano and Porte d'Ivry under the designation T3
- 18 June 2008: speed increased from 16 to 18 km/h (9.9–11.2 mph)
- 15 December 2012: extension from Porte d'Ivry to Porte de Vincennes opens as Line 3a
- 15 December 2012: Line 3b starts operation on the extension from Porte de Vincennes to Porte de la Chapelle
- 24 November 2018: extension of Line 3b from Porte de la Chapelle to Marguerite Long opens
- 5 April 2024: extension of Line 3b from Marguerite Long to Porte Dauphine opens

=== Little Ring Line ===
The Little Ring Line (Ligne de la Petite Ceinture) was constructed in order to link the major rail supply routes within the Thiers Fortifications that surrounded Paris. The line was opened in sections between 1852 and 1869, reaching a total length of 32 km (20 mi) and encircling Paris within the boulevards des Maréchaux.

Initially, the line was for the exclusive use of freight traffic, before subsequently opening to passenger traffic. The Ligne d'Auteuil, in contrast, opened to passengers only immediately in 1854, and only opened to freight in 1867. The railway saw a rapid growth in passenger numbers towards the end of the 19th century, especially during the Exposition Universelle (1878). However, the inappropriateness of the equipment, consisting of steam locomotives that made the cars hot and uncomfortable, made the line less and less attractive, and it was unable to resist competition from the Métro.

After 1900, passenger numbers saw a constant and relentless fall until, in April 1934, despite several failed attempts to improve the situation, the line permanently closed to passengers, except the Ligne d'Auteuil, which remained open until January 1985. Some months later, in July 1934, the PC Bus Line was created, and was an immediate success.

Freight traffic also disappeared at the start of the 1990s, and most of the line has since been abandoned and split by modern development. The section of the Ligne d'Auteuil between Pereire-Levallois and Avenue Henri-Martin, however, was integrated with RER C of the commuter rail network (Réseau Express Régional).

== Rolling stock ==
The line is operated by a fleet of Alstom Citadis 402 trams.

The trams were ordered in December 2003 and manufactured in factories at Le Creusot (bogies), Tarbes (electrical and electronic traction), Villeurbanne (electronics), Ornans (motors), with final assembly performed at Aytré, near La Rochelle.

Their design aesthetic was the subject of extensive research by several designers: Régine Charvet-Pello (and designers of his company RCP Design Global) for the general concept, the colorist for Vonnik Hertig upholstery and indoor environment, Emmanuel Fedon and Luc Maillet for the exterior. The livery of the trams is personalised, combining the RATP's traditional jade green with various visual symbols of the city.

== Gallery ==
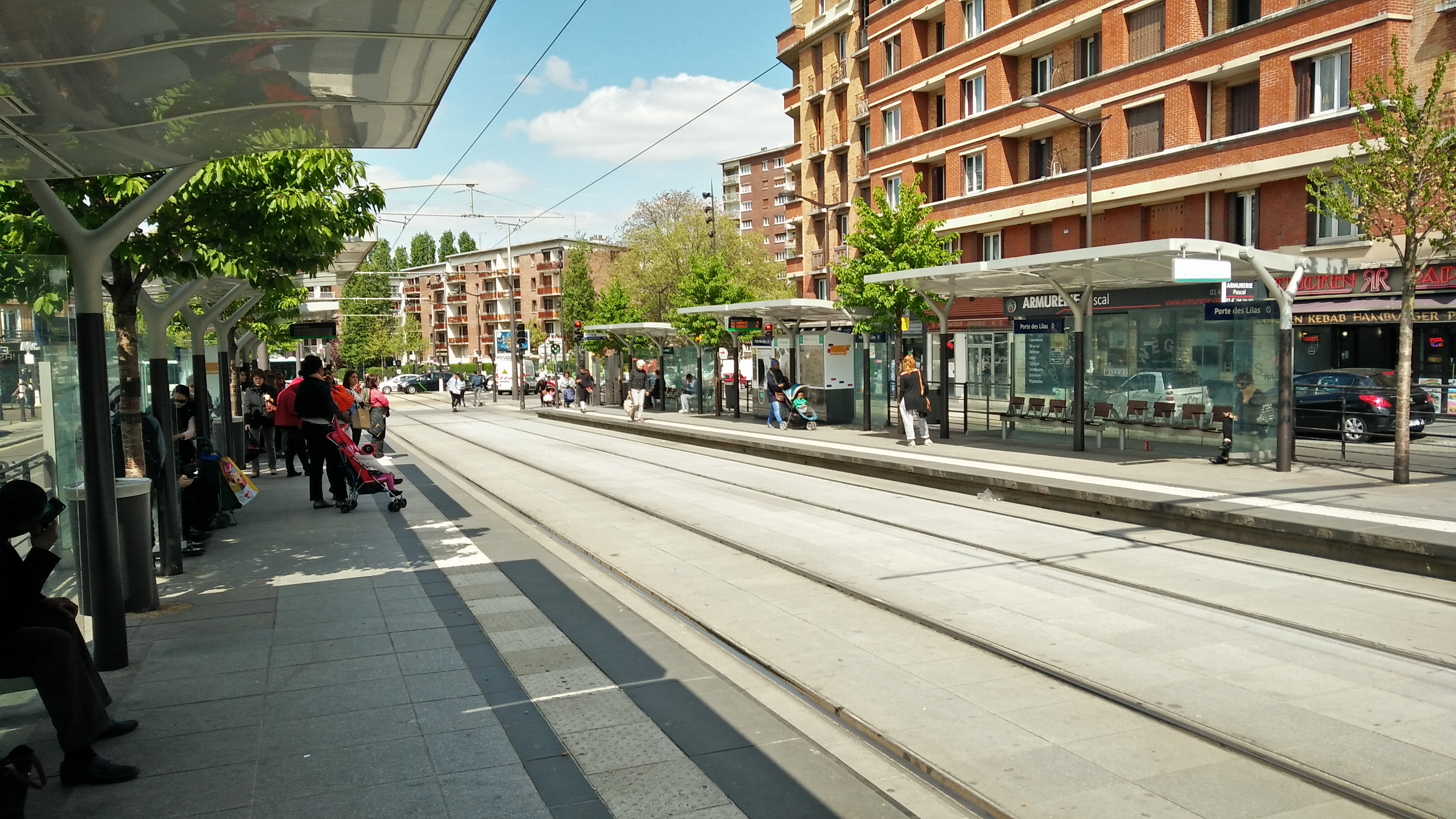
Porte des Lilas on Line 3b

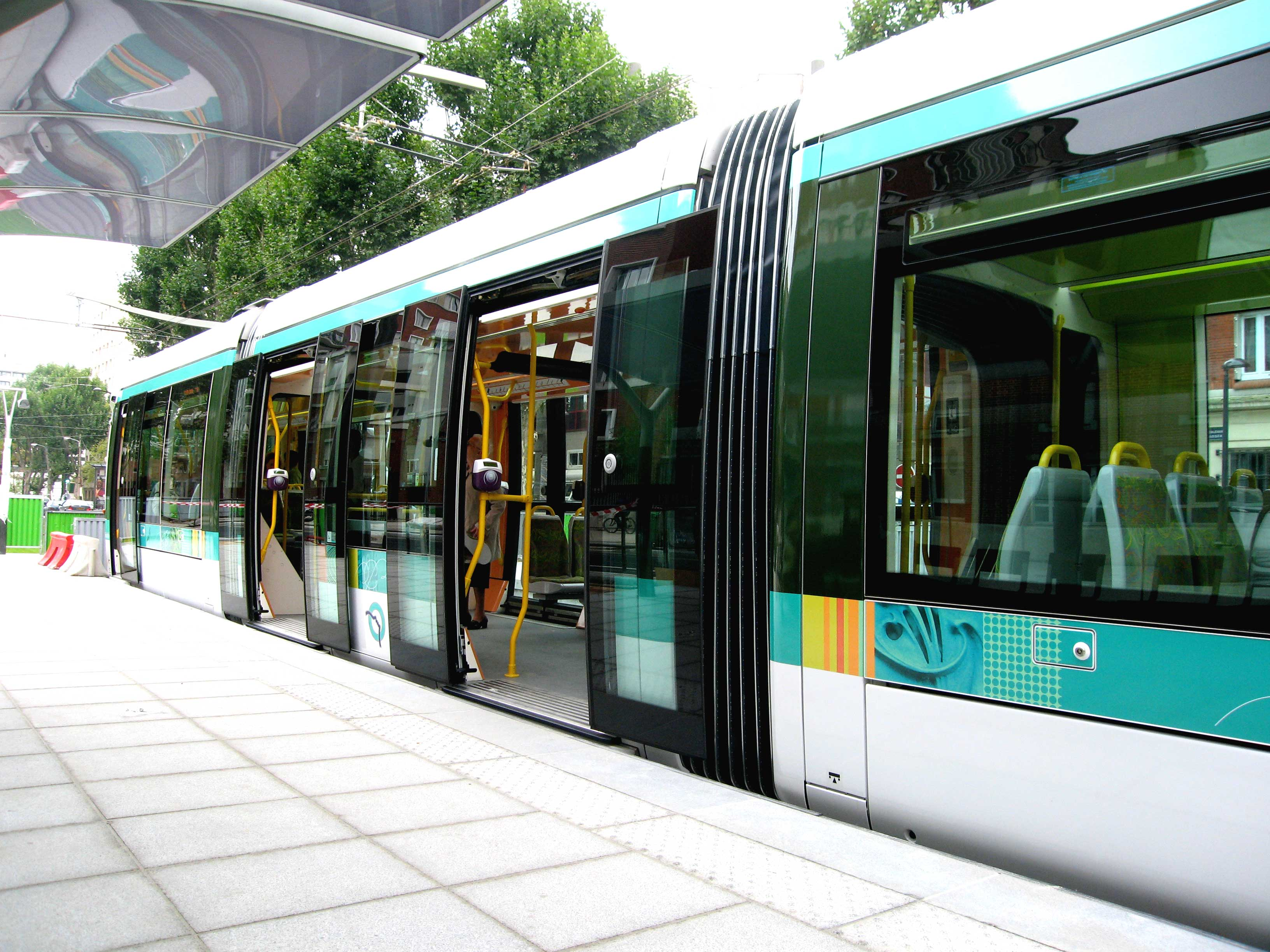
T3 rolling stock at a stop

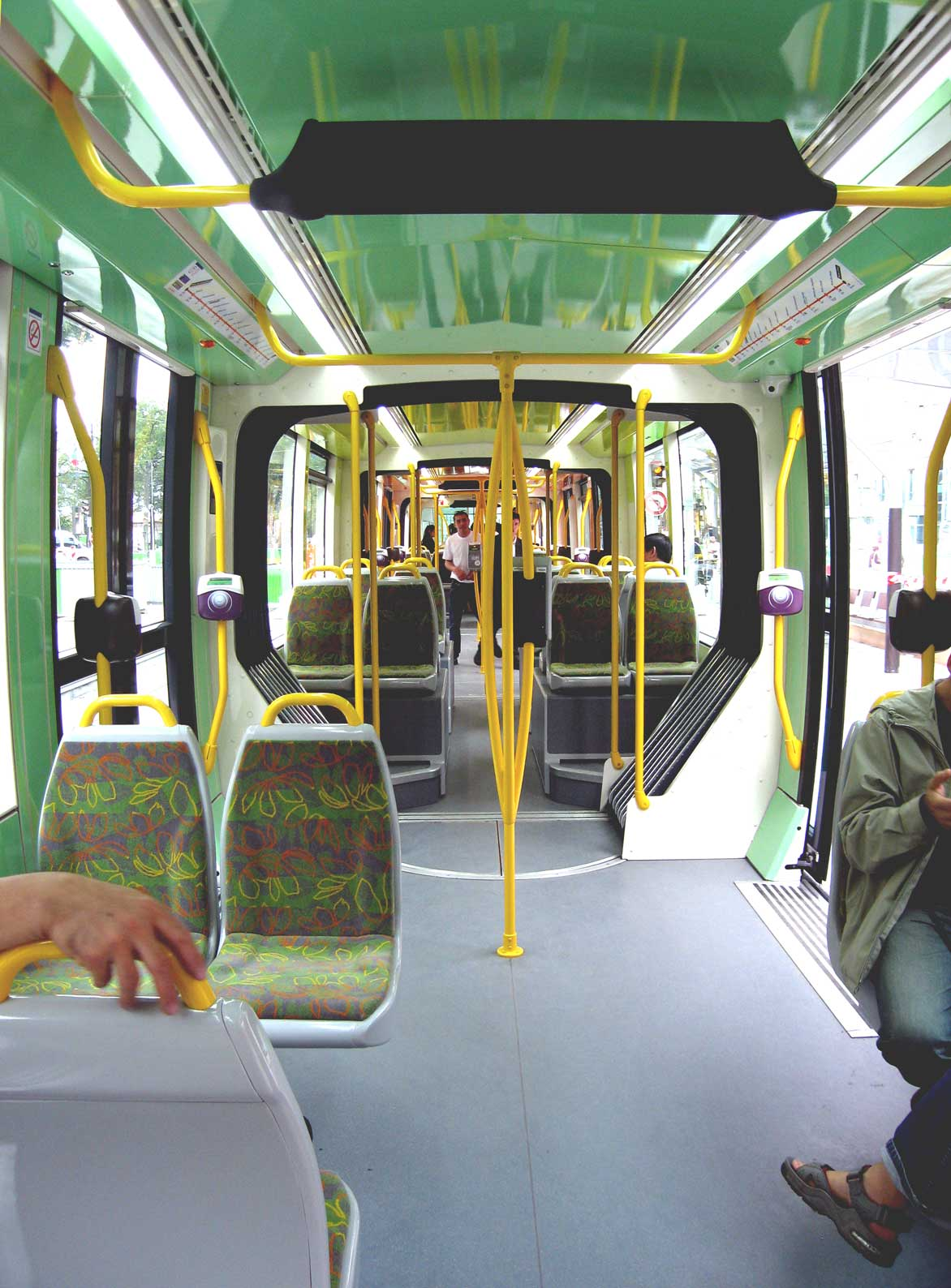
Inside the T3 Citadis

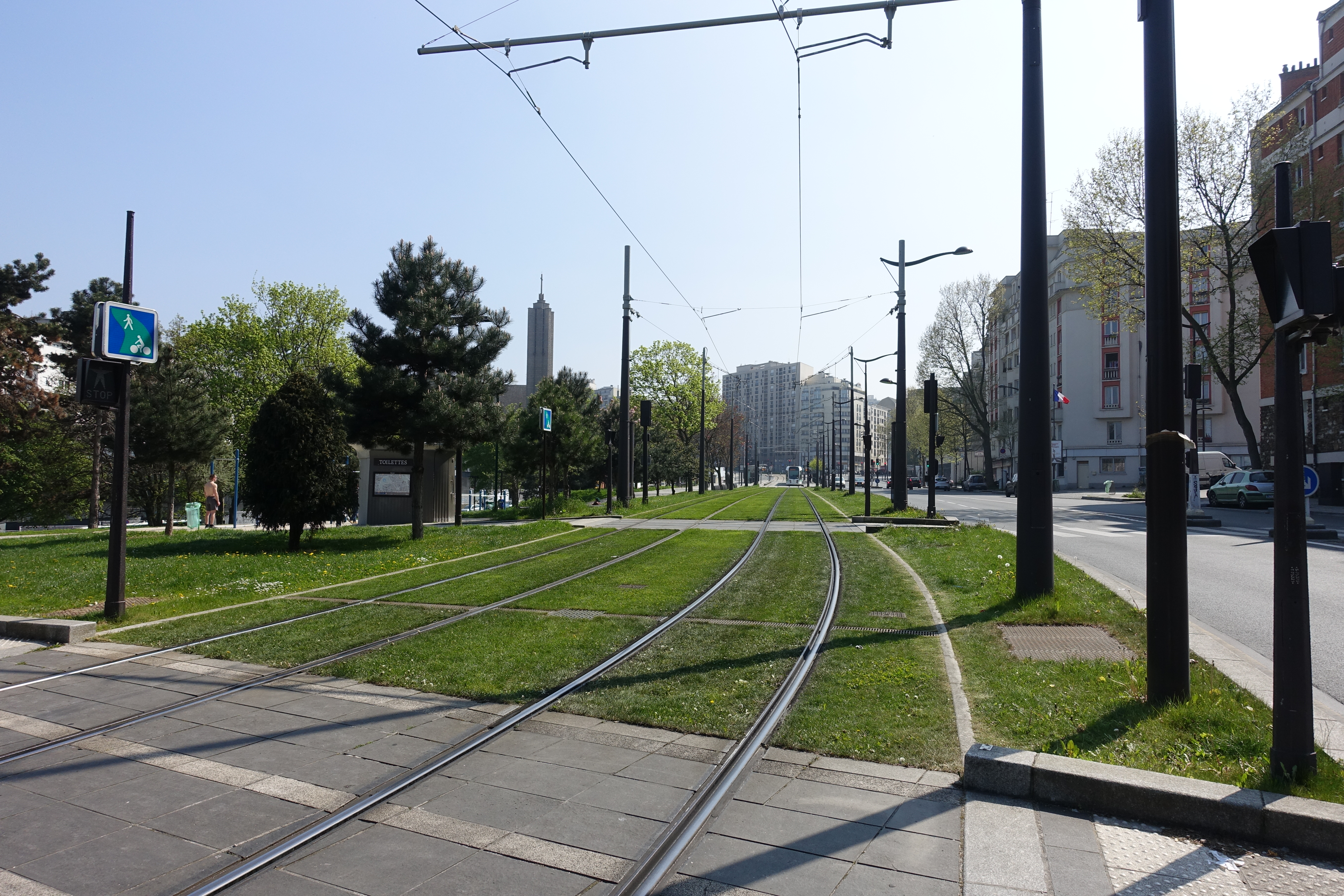
T3b tracks

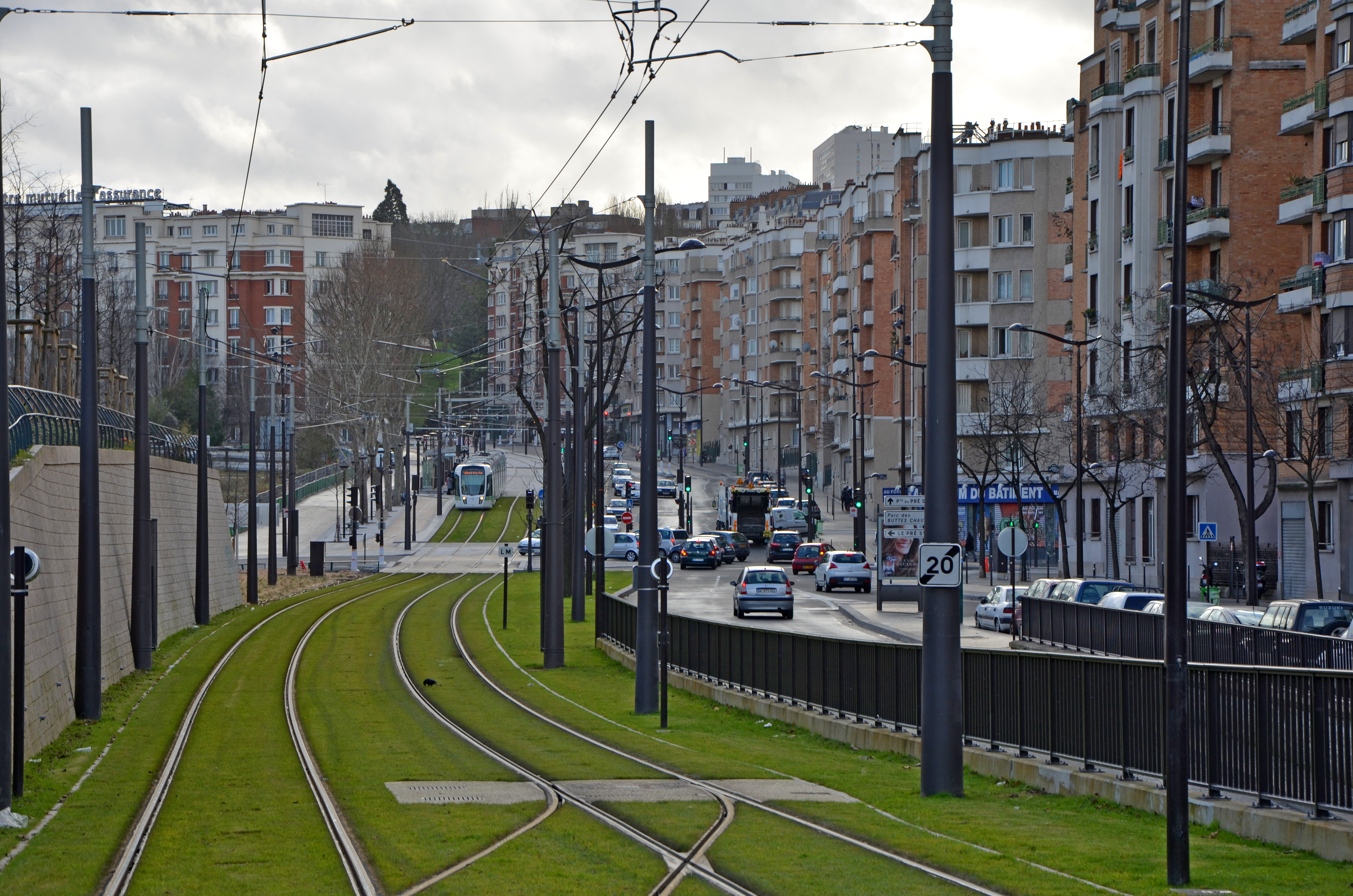
Green track at Porte de Chaumont
