= Centre Pompidou Hanwha =

South Korean museum

Coordinates: 37.52006°N 126.93919°E

The Centre Pompidou Hanwha (Korean: 퐁피두센터 한화) is a museum in Yeouido, Seoul, South Korea. It is scheduled for opening on June 4, 2026.

== History ==
The museum is a collaboration between the Centre Pompidou in Paris and the Hanwha Foundation of Culture. It is scheduled to open on June 4, 2026, which is the 140th anniversary of diplomatic ties between France and South Korea, with the exhibition The Cubists: Inventing Modern Vision.

Negotiated starting in 2023, the inaugural licensing contract between the two organizations will last for four years, until 2029, with a commitment to show two major exhibitions sourced from the former's collection each year. Additionally, it will show special exhibitions for contemporary Korean artists, as well as provide educational and cultural programming.

The building is a renovation of a part of Tower 63 previously used as an aquarium and was designed by Jean-Michel Wilmotte. Visuals of the museum were revealed in April 2026, two months ahead of its opening. With four stories, two 1,500-square-feet main gallery spaces, and a total of 108,000 square feet of space, the building has a glass facade in the shape of an envelope "which filters daylight during the day and transforms the structure into a glowing urban landmark at night."
