= Hôpital Européen Georges-Pompidou =

- Assistance publique - Hôpitaux de Paris

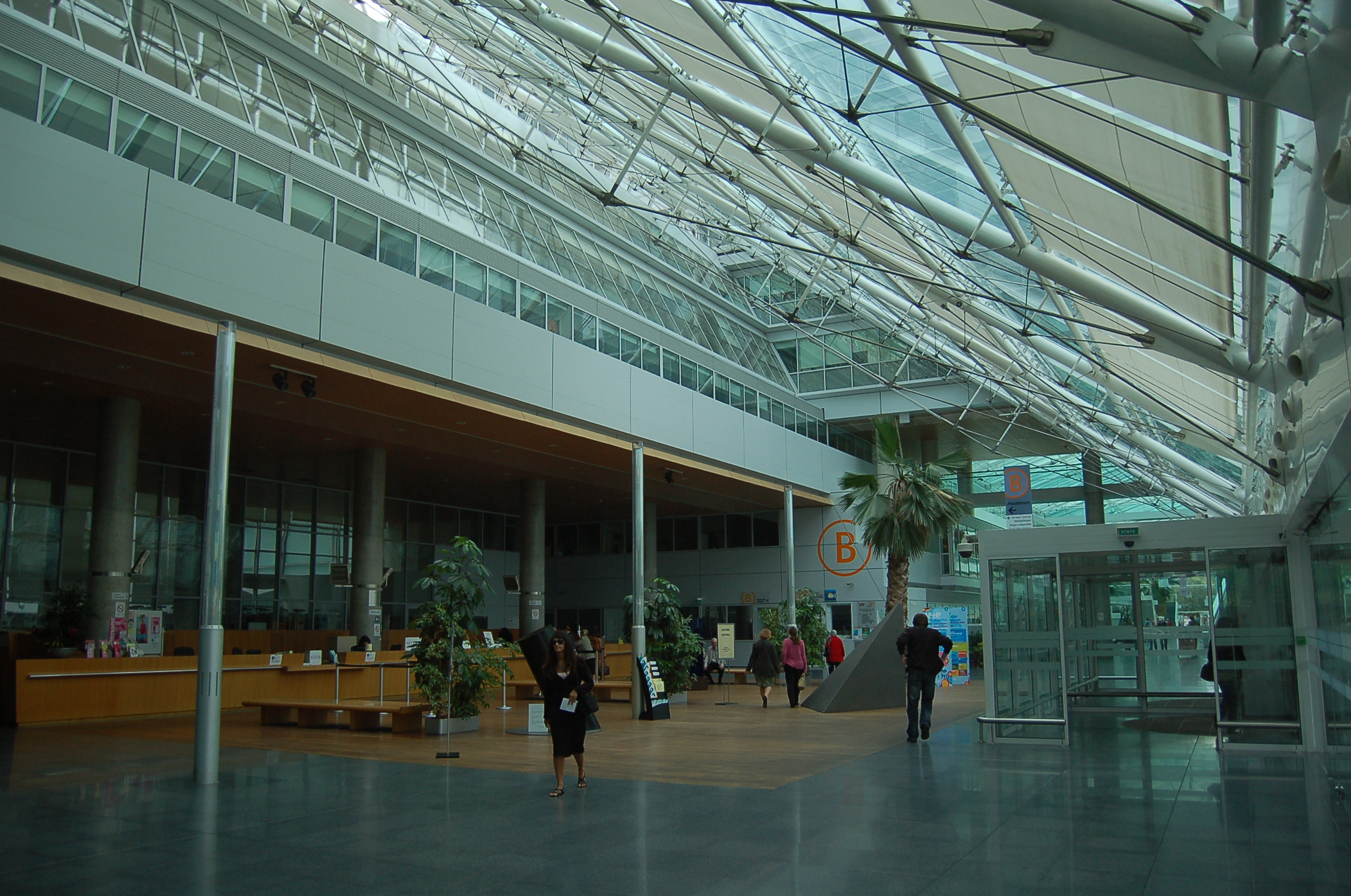
- Entrance of the Hall B

Geography
- Location: 15th arrondissement, Paris, France
- Coordinates: 48°50′20″N 2°16′25″E

History
- Opened: 2001

Links
- Website: hopital-georgespompidou.aphp.fr
- Lists: Hospitals in France

The Hôpital Européen Georges-Pompidou (French pronunciation: [opital øʁɔpeɛ̃ ʒɔʁʒ pɔ̃pidu], Georges Pompidou European Hospital, abbr. HEGP) is a French hospital located in Paris.

The HEGP is under the aegis of the Assistance publique - Hôpitaux de Paris (AP-HP).

Opened in 2001, the HEGP is the last-born Parisian hospital resulting from the merger of three older hospitals of the 15th district (Boucicaut Hospital, Broussais Hospital and Laënnec Hospital). The hospital architect was Aymeric Zublena.

The HEGP is located near the city gate called the Porte de Sèvres, in the southwestern part of the 15th arrondissement. (There is also a Museum of Modern Art in the Centre Georges Pompidou in the 4th arrondissement of Paris.)

The HEGP can be reached by the Métro station Balard on Line 8, the station Pont du Garigliano on both RER C and Tramway T3 and the Buses 42, 88 and 169.

It is known as one of the leading hospitals at European and World level in the cardiac domain. In 2013, French Professor Alain Carpentier developed the first 100% artificial heart, using biomaterials and electronic sensors. The device was successfully implanted by a team at the hospital on 18 December 2013.
