= Pont du Garigliano station =

Railway station in Paris, France

Pont du Garigliano Hôpital Européen Georges Pompidou
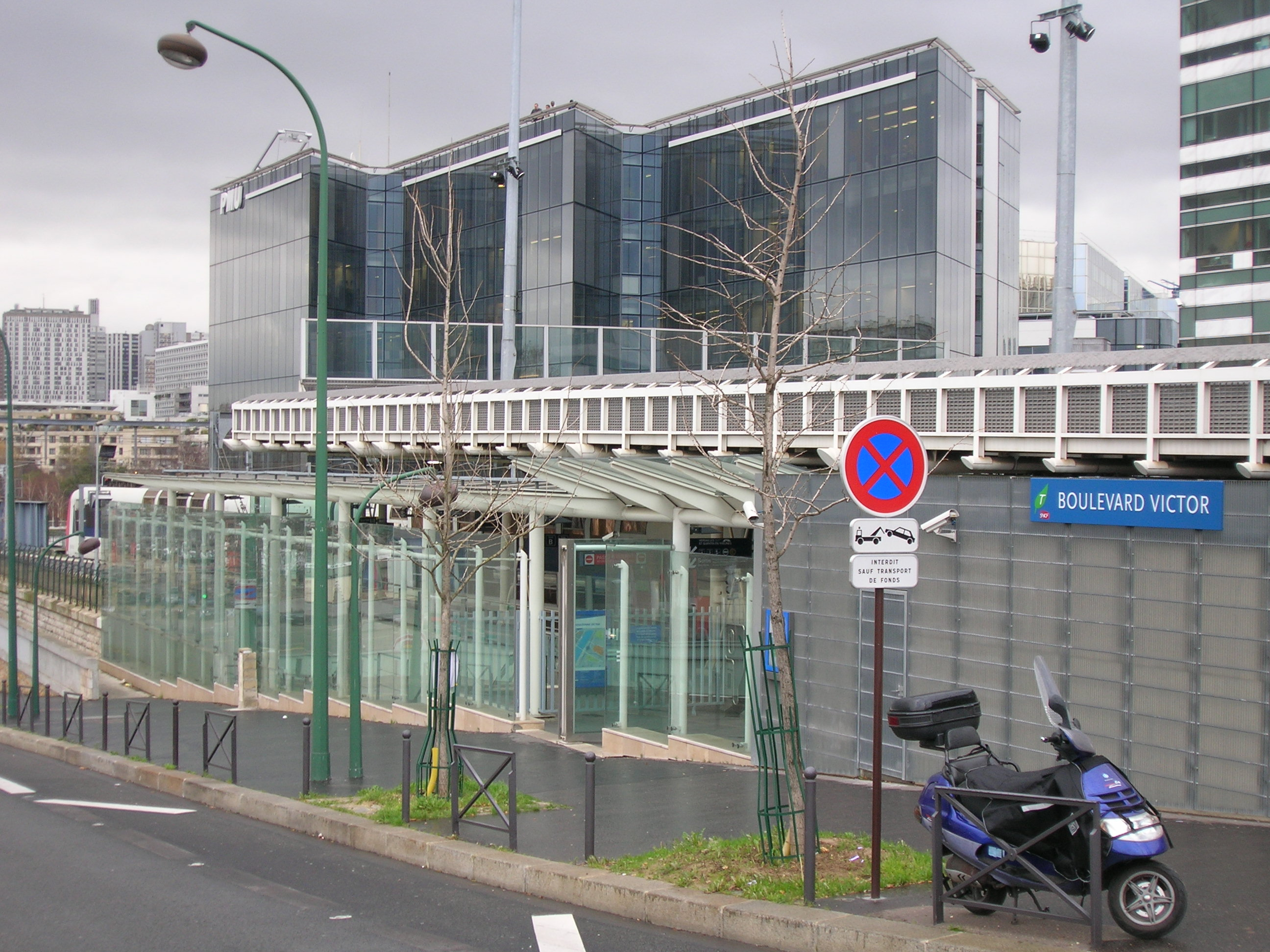
- View of the station from adjacent road.

General information
- Location: Esplanade Henri de France; Paris; France
- Coordinates: 48°50′19″N 2°16′12″E
- Operator: RER: SNCF; Tramway: RATP Group
- Platforms: RER: 2 side platforms; Tramway: 2 side platform
- Tracks: RER: 2; Tramway: 2

Construction
- Structure type: At-grade
- Accessible: Yes, by prior reservation

Other information
- Station code: 87393322
- Fare zone: 2

History
- Opened: 1889
- Former names: Boulevard Victor; Boulevard Victor–Pont du Garigliano

Passengers
- 2024: 2,581,658

Services
Preceding station	RER	Following station
Issy–Val de Seine towards Versailles Château Rive Gauche or Saint-Quentin-en-Yvelines	RER C	Javel towards Massy-Palaiseau, Dourdan-la-Forêt or Saint-Martin-d'Étampes
Preceding station	Tram	Following station
Terminus	T3a	Balard towards Porte de Vincennes
Location

Pont du Garigliano station (English: Garigliano Bridge) is a station on the RER C line of the Paris Region's express suburban rail system, the Réseau Express Régional (RER) and Line 3a of the Île-de-France tramway network. The station is named for the nearby Pont du Garigliano and Hôpital Européen Georges-Pompidou

It is located in the 15th arrondissement of Paris, near the Seine. The station was originally named Boulevard Victor when it first opened, but it was renamed Boulevard Victor–Pont du Garigliano in 2006 for the opening of tramway Line 3, then renamed again in early 2010.

== See also ==
- List of stations of the Paris RER
- List of stations of the Paris Métro
