= Madame Pompadour (disambiguation) =

Madame de Pompadour (1721–1764) was a member of the French court and was the official chief mistress of Louis XV.

Madame Pompadour may also refer to:

- Madame Pompadour (1927 film), a 1927 British silent historical drama film by Herbert Wilcox
- Madame Pompadour (operetta), a 1922 operetta composed by Leo Fall with a libretto by Rudolph Schanzer and Ernst Welisch
- Madame Pompadour (1931 film), a 1931 German historical musical film
- "The Girl in the Fireplace", a 2006 episode of Doctor Who featuring Madame Pompadour
