= Pont du Garigliano =

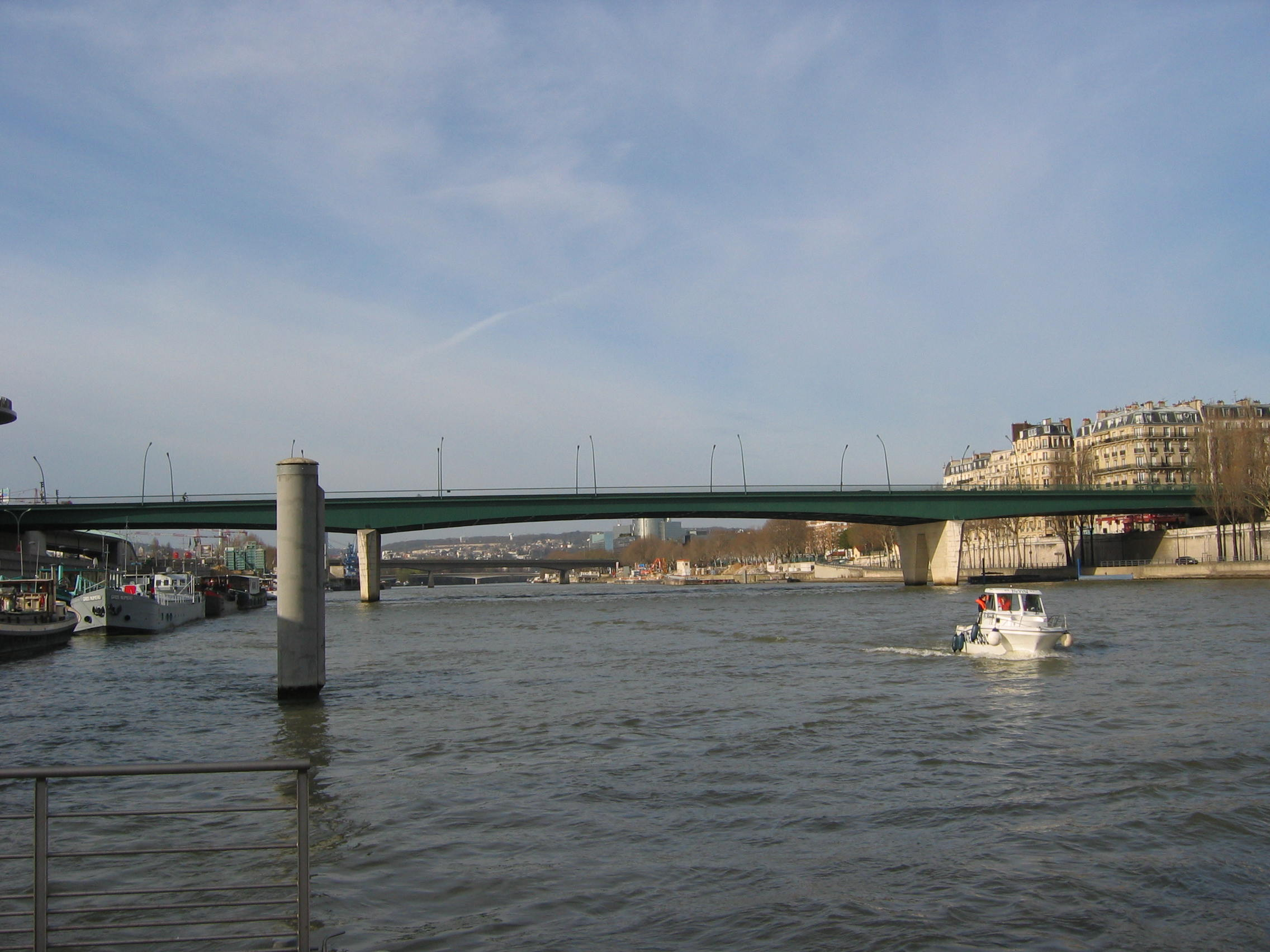
- The bridge from upstream
- Coordinates: 48°50′21.7″N 2°16′6″E
- Crosses: Seine
- Locale: Paris, France
- Next upstream: Pont Mirabeau
- Next downstream: Pont aval

Characteristics
- Design: Arch bridge
- Total length: 209 m
- Width: 26 m
- Height: 11 m

History
- Construction start: 1963
- Construction end: 1966

The Pont du Garigliano (French pronunciation: [pɔ̃ dy ɡaʁiɡlijano] (Note: "Garigliano" comes from Italian, and the "g" in "gli" is not pronounced as [ɡ]; instead, the whole "gli" is pronounced as [ʎ]. Due to this difference from French orthography, French speakers may pronounce the "g" in "gli" as [ɡ]. See also Broglie.)) is a bridge across the Seine in Paris.

== Location and construction ==
The Pont du Garigliano links Boulevard Martial-Valin in the quartier de Javel (15th arrondissement), to Boulevard Exelmans in the Auteuil quartier (16th arrondissement). It is a metal bridge made of three spans (of 58m, 93m and 58m) soldered to six beams and carried on only two piles, close to the river banks. It spans roadways on both banks before reaching the ground. It is the highest bridge in Paris, at 11 metres above the level of the Seine (making it a popular place for suicides, such as that of Boris Fraenkel). It is very close to the studios of France Télévision, and to the Hôpital Européen Georges-Pompidou.

== Transport links ==
Location on the Seine

- Tramway stations : Pont du Garigliano (Line 3)
- Métro stations: Exelmans (line 9) and Balard (line 8)
- RER stations: Boulevard Victor - Pont du Garigliano (line C)
- Bus stops: PC1, 22, 42, 72, 88 and 169 routes.

== History ==
From 1863 to 1962, the two-level stone viaduc d'Auteuil (or viaduc du Point-du-Jour) ran across the river at this point, carrying Petite Ceinture trains on its upper level and car traffic on its lower level. When car transport increased on the Boulevards of the Marshals, and since the arches of the existing structure were too low to be passed under by river traffic, it was decided to replace it. Construction began in 1963 under the architect Davy and the engineer Thenault, and the new structure was inaugurated on 1 September 1966. The present structure is named after General Juin's victory at the Battle of Garigliano in Italy in 1944.

Since the end of 2006, the art-work Le Téléphone has been installed on its downstream side, implanted in the exterior face of the pavement. It consists of a telephone cabin sculpted in the form of a flower by the architect Frank Gehry, with no function other than to receive calls from Sophie Calle, the artist who created the idea, in order to accompany the inauguration of the service on Tramway des Maréchaux, whose terminus is very close.
