= Lycée Paul Valéry (Paris) =

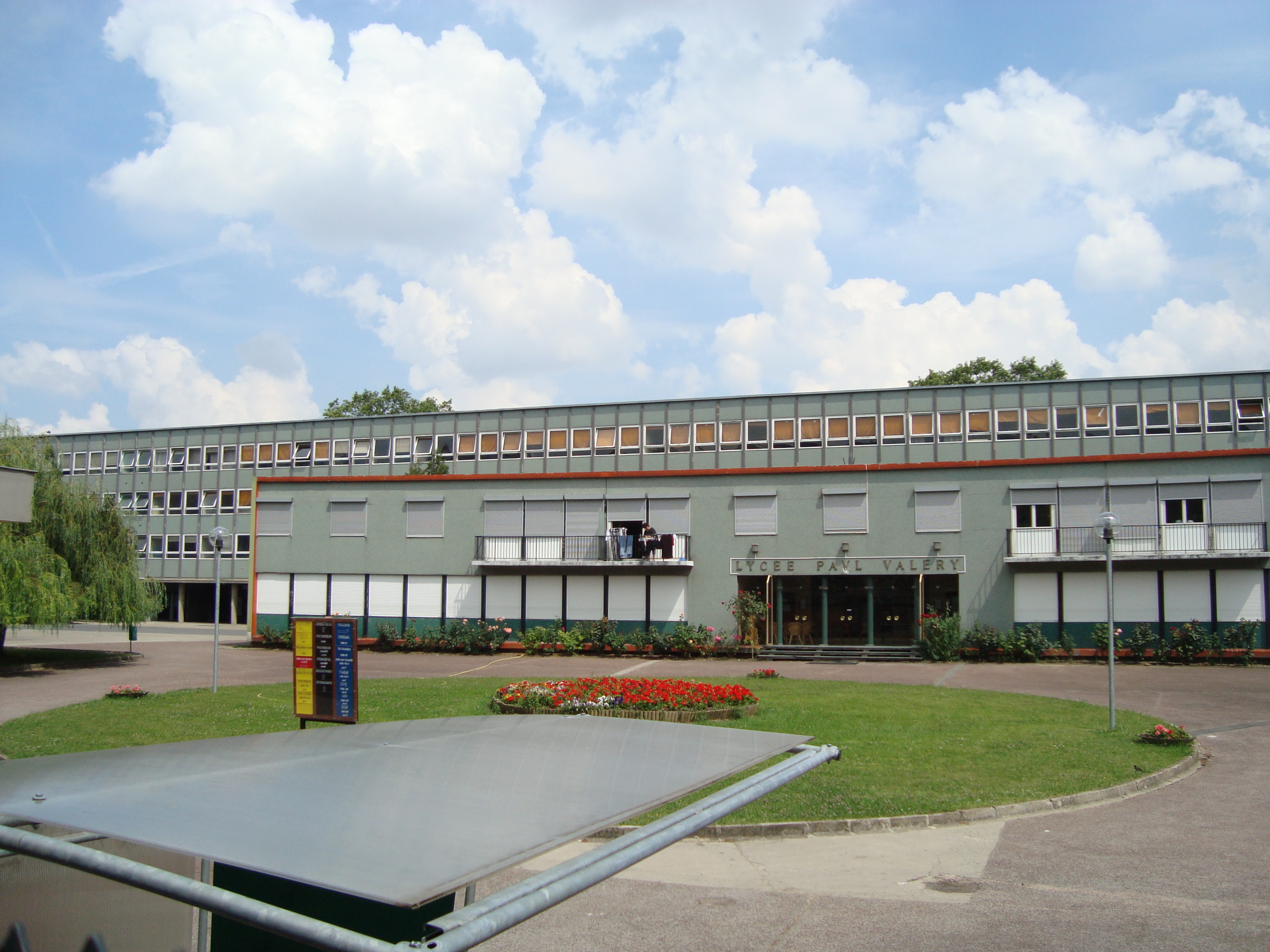
- Entrance to the lycée Paul-Valéry.

Location
- 38, boulevard Soult, Paris; France
- Coordinates: 48.839067°N 2.4101686°E

Information
- Type: Établissement public local d'enseignement (EPLE)
- Opened: start of the 1960s
- Principal: Claudine Vuong
- Enrollment: ~1,400 students
- Website: lyc-paulvalery.ac-paris.fr

The lycée Paul-Valéry, commonly known as PV, is a public general and technological school in the 12th arrondissement of Paris located at 38, boulevard Soult. It is a lycée specialising in science, economics, literature and arts, particularly known for its courses in cinema and audiovisual, which were the first created in France, in 1983.

The lycée Paul-Valéry is also known for a sociological documentary following a group of a students, filmed annually for ten years between 1984 and 1993, entitled Que deviendront-ils ?.

The Association of former students, teachers and administrative staff of the lycée Paul-Valéry (APV) was founded by a group of former students in 2010. Its headquarters are at 38 boulevard Soult, 75012 Paris, its website is at www.apvparis.fr, and it has a Facebook group called "Alumni Paul Valéry Paris".

== History ==
The lycée was built in two tranches at the beginning of the 1960s, on the site of the former fortifications of the Thiers wall, under the name of annexe du lycée Jean-Baptiste-Say (opened in September 1957), then lycée mixte du boulevard Soult, before getting its current name in 1962 after the writer and poet Paul Valéry following a survey of students and suggested by Hellenist Pierre Fortassier. It is the largest school in the 12th arrondissement of Paris both in area (200 metres (660 ft) long on four floors), and number of students. It is one of the lycées built following the post-war baby boom. At the time it was built, the lycée Paul-Valéry had the widest catchment area in Paris, from the East of Paris to the current département of Val-de-Marne.

== Architecture ==
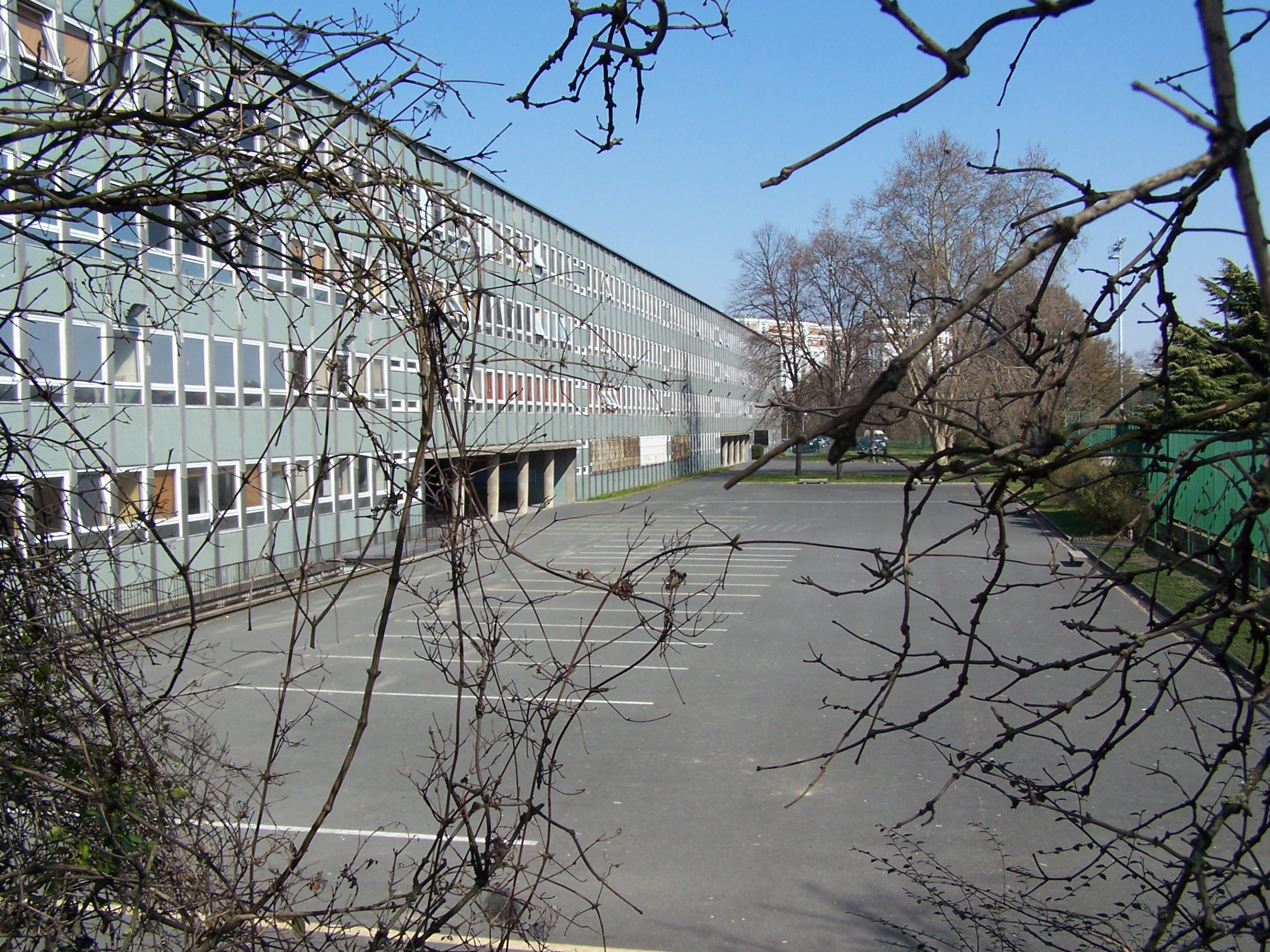
The rear of lycée Paul-Valéry from rue du Général-Archinard.

The lycée Paul-Valéry, designed by architects J.C. Dondel and R. Dhuit resembles a number of other lycées built at the start of the 1960s: a single lycée building with repeating windows along its length, multicoloured windows over the yard, and green and orange mosaics on the building's walls.

A giant bronze sculpture, designed by sculptor Robert Couturier (1905-2008), showing a couple holding a baby in their arms was located on the circular grass area at the entrance to the school. This sculpture was controversial amongst a group of students' parents (the man was naked, the woman was not). The administration did not comment on the statues, but after the summer break, the circular bowling green was clear.

== Courses ==
The lycée has around 1,750 students in its college (450 students), lycée and preparatory classes (1,300 students) and 150 teachers. For around twenty years, the lycée has run numerous artistic courses, particularly based around audiovisual arts, with the creation in 1983 of the first audiovisual cinema section in France. For the past few years, the lycée Paul-Valéry has been the only lycée in Paris offering a cinema option for the classes préparatoires aux grandes écoles, particularly working in collaboration with the École normale supérieure (Paris). This option is only available for the hypokhâgne (the khâgne is offered by the lycée Hélène-Boucher) and since 2010 the khâgne offer has been extended with the opening of a Khâgne Ulm, with cinema-audiovisual options, modern literature, and history/geography. The lycée has sporting infrastructure in place, and a field covering four hectares.

Furthermore, according to the headteacher, with the changes to catchment areas which took place in 2007, the lycée benefits from "a small rebalancing between schools" due to the arrival of students from areas which are statistically more privileged and receive higher grades but want to continue their studies, but who have difficulty finding a place. From 2011, the lycée is one of three schools in Paris (Louis-le-Grand, Chaptal, Janson-de-Sailly) to offer the first and last years of a science and technology for industry and development course (Stidd). The lycée offers Classe préparatoire aux grandes écoles in literature (Khâgnes A/L and LSH), economic and commercial (ECS), and science (MP and PSI).

=== Lycée ranking ===
In 2015, the lycée was ranked 106th out of 109 at départemental level in terms of teaching quality and 2220th out of 2301 at national level. The ranking is based on three criteria: the bac results, the proportion of students who obtain their baccalauréat after spending their last two years at the establishment, and "added value", (calculated based on the social origin of students, their age, and their national diploma results).

=== CPGE rankings ===
The national rankings for preparatory classes to the grandes écoles (CPGE) is shown as the rate of admission for students to the grandes écoles.

In 2015, L'Étudiant gave the following rates for 2014 :

Stream	Students admitted to a grande école^{*}	Admission rate^{*}	Average rate over 5 years	National ranking	Comparison to previous year
ECS	0 / 36 students	0%	0%	95thex-æquo out of 95	=
Khâgne A/L	0 / 42 students	0%	0%	41stex-æquo out of 41	=
MP / MP*	0 / 22 students	0%	0%	114thex-æquo out of 114	=
PSI / PSI*	1 / 44 students	2%	6%	77thex-æquo out of 120	29
Source : Classement 2015 des prépas - L'Étudiant (Concours de 2014). * the rate of admission to the grandes écoles depends upon the schools included in the study. For ECE and ECS, these are HEC, ESSEC, and the ESCP. For the khâgnes, these are the ENSAE, the ENC, the three ENS, and five schools of commerce (HEC, ESSEC, ESCP, EM Lyon and EDHEC). In the science streams, these are a group of 11 of the 17 engineering schools which take from this stream (MP, PC, PSI, PT or BCPST).

== Documentary: Que deviendront-ils ? ==
Que deviendront-ils ? is the title of a documentary directed by Michel Fresnel, which consisted of 12 episodes between 1984 and 1996, shown on Antenne 2, then France 2, and finally on France 5. The students from a sixth-form college at lycée Paul-Valéry were followed on camera by Michel Fresnel who directed a sociological documentary on the youth who grew up in the 1980s. It followed their day-to-day life, their difficulties, and their hopes. After a three-year break, Que deviendront-ils ? returned for a final two episodes.

== Alumni ==
=== Notable former students ===
- Alexandre Adler, journalist and historian.
- Martine Aubry Minister and Deputy, Mayor of Lille.
- Franck Balandier, writer
- Catherine Belkhodja, actress, journalist, author/director
- Jean Bonnefoy, translator, writer, musician.
- Jean-Claude Dauphin, actor.
- Sophie Duez, actress.
- France Gall, musician and singer.
- Zeev Gourarier (1953-), museum director.
- Maurice Gourdault-Montagne, ambassador and diplomat
- Eva Ionesco, actress and director.
- Philippe du Janerand, actor and writer.
- Christian Louboutin, shoe designer.
- Maïwenn, actress, director, producer
- Sandrine Mazetier politician, Deputy.
- Jean Mulatier, cartoonist, caricaturist.
- Charlotte Valandrey, actress.
- Rama Yade, Secretary of State.
- Smaïn, French actress and comedian.

=== Former notable teachers ===
- Michèle Blumenthal, Mayor of the 12th arrondissement of Paris (2001-2014)
- David Assouline
- Jean-Marie Zemb
- Arthur Giovoni, Professor of literature, resistant, and politician e

== Access ==
The lycée is accessible on the lines :

- 8 Porte-Dorée and Michel Bizot
- 6 Bel-Air
- Bus (RATP) RATP bus routes from 20 to 99#Ligne 29
- Tram: 3a Montempoivre.
