= Boulevard Poniatowski =

Street in Paris, France

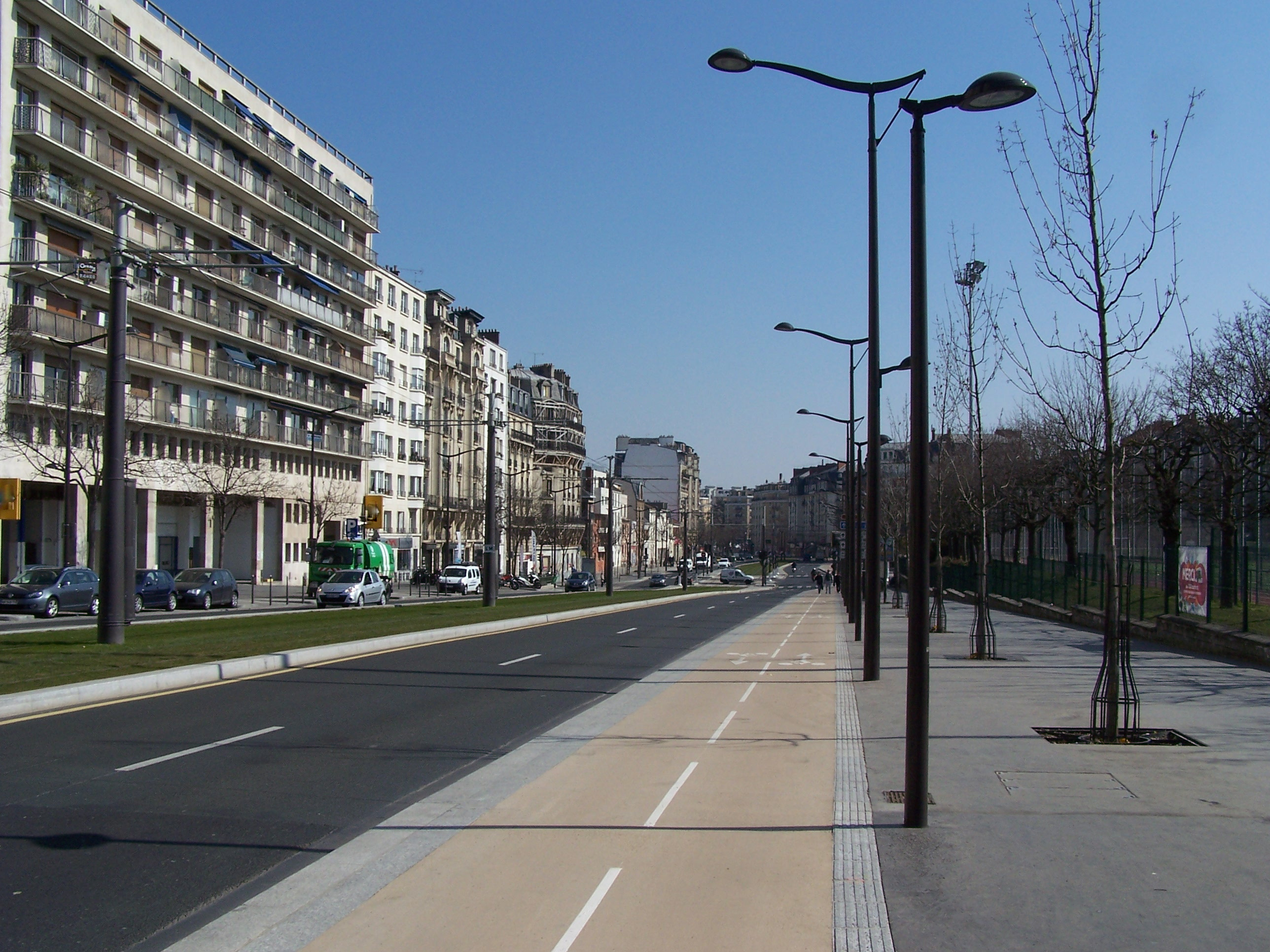
- Looking north, between the Porte de Charenton and the Porte Dorée

- Location within Paris
- Namesake: Józef Poniatowski
- Length: 1,450 m (4,760 ft)
- Width: 28.80 m (94.5 ft) to 40 m (130 ft)
- Arrondissement: 12th
- Quarter: Bel-Air, Picpus, Paris and Bercy
- Coordinates: 48°49′54″N 2°23′52″E
- From: Quai de Bercy
- To: 282, avenue Daumesnil and 2, place Édouard-Renard

Construction
- Denomination: March 2, 1864

The Boulevard Poniatowski is a boulevard in the Bel-Air, Picpus and Bercy neighborhoods in the 12th arrondissement of Paris, France. It is one of the Boulevards of the Marshals that run in the outer parts of the city.

== Location ==
The Boulevard Poniatowski starts at the Quai de Bercy and goes through the Porte de Charenton, before ending at the Porte Dorée and the Avenue Dumesnil, where it is continued by the Boulevard Soult.

The Boulevard Poniatowski was accessible through the Petite Ceinture bus line. It can now be reached through the tramway Line 3, the Métro Line 8 (Porte Dorée and Porte de Charenton stations), as well as RATP bus lines 29, 46, 87, 109 and 111.

== History ==
The French war department had completed the Thiers wall – including fortifications, a dry moat, a Rue Militaire and a large berm – around 1840. In 1859, the military engineering service gave conditional control to the Paris city council. The expansion of the land area of Paris in 1860, by annexing bordering communities, created a situation where everything within the Thiers wall was Paris and everything without was not. The Thiers wall, with its accompanying berm and moat, led to a profound disruption and complication of the synergistic relationship between Paris and its suburbs.

Paris city council started upgrading and conversion of some sections of the Rue Militaire into boulevards in 1861, with the (yet unnamed) Boulevard Poniatowski one of the first stretches to open. In 1864, the boulevard was named after Polish-born Józef Poniatowski (1763–1813), 1st Duke of Dalmatia and Marshal of France. Each section of the upgraded Rue Militaire was then named for a marshal of the First French Empire (1804–1814) who served under Napoleon, leading to the entire ring being collectively called the Boulevards of the Marshals. The Boulevards of the Marshals concept was almost fully realized by 1932, though the final three sections, closing the ring, would not be completed until 2005. Of the 22 boulevards, 19 have been named for Poniatowski or one of his fellow First Empire marshals.

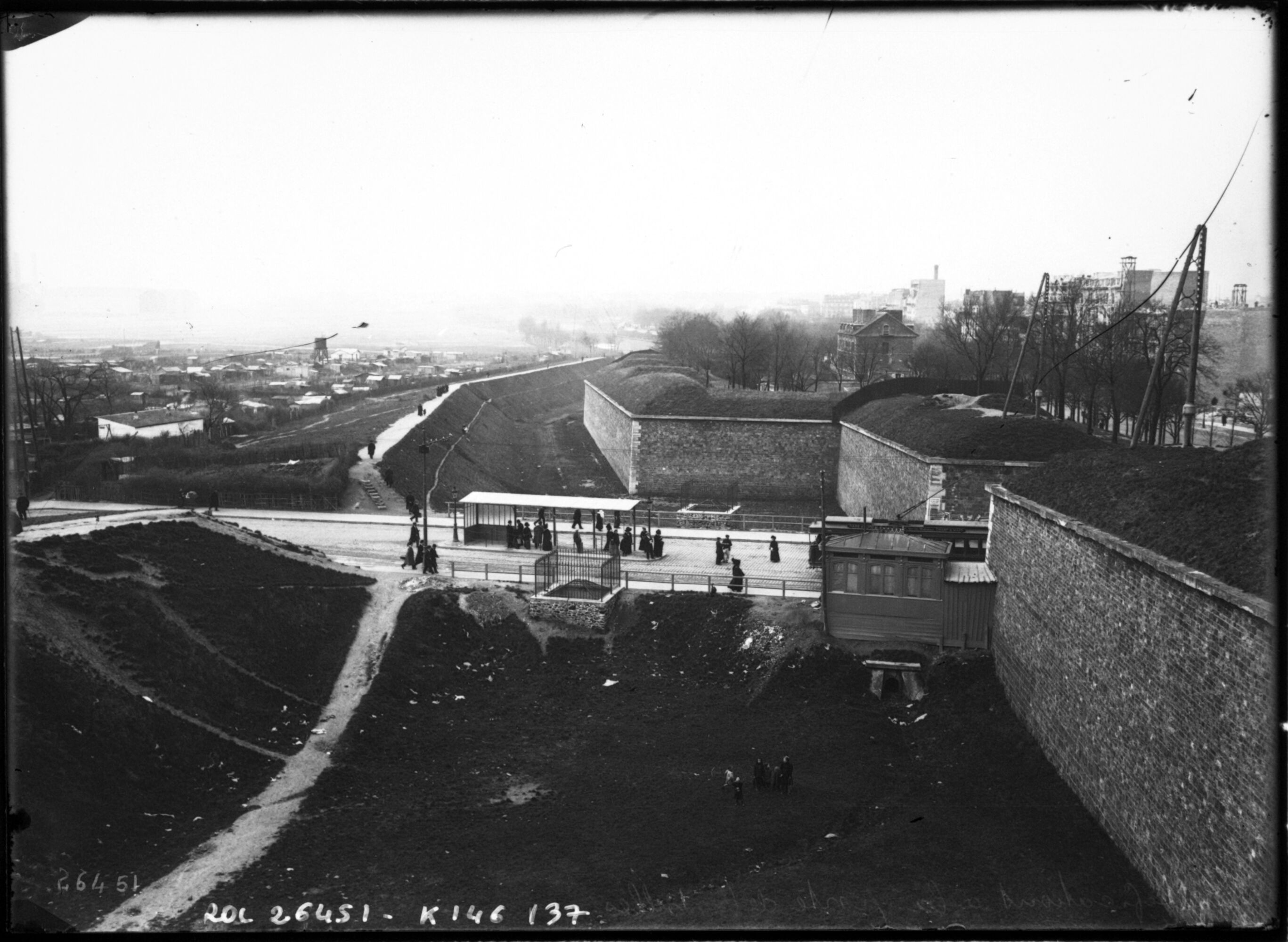
A portion of the Thiers wall, showing the berm and dry moat, near the Porte de Versailles

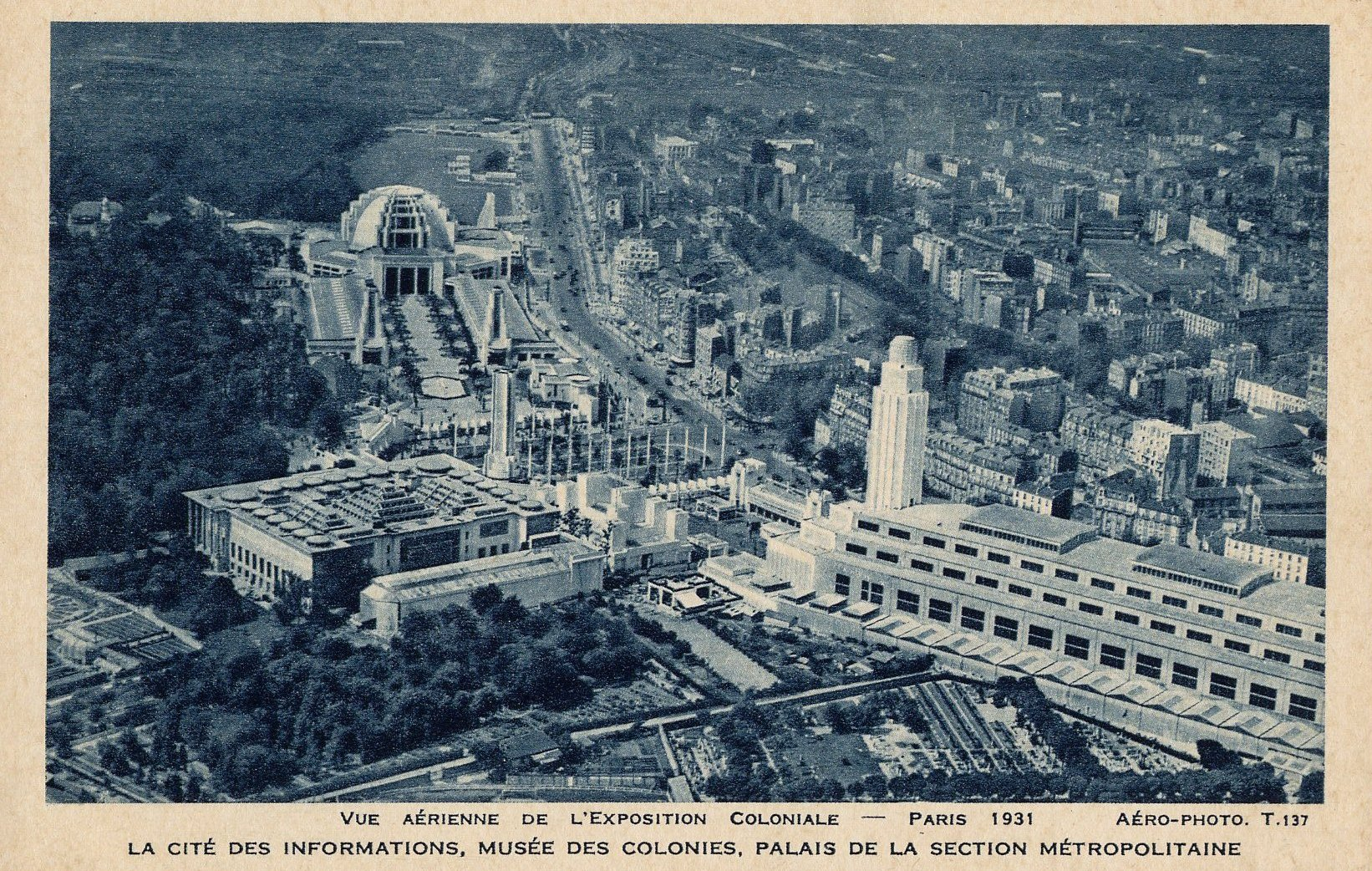
Boulevard Poniatowski during the 1931 Paris Colonial Exposition

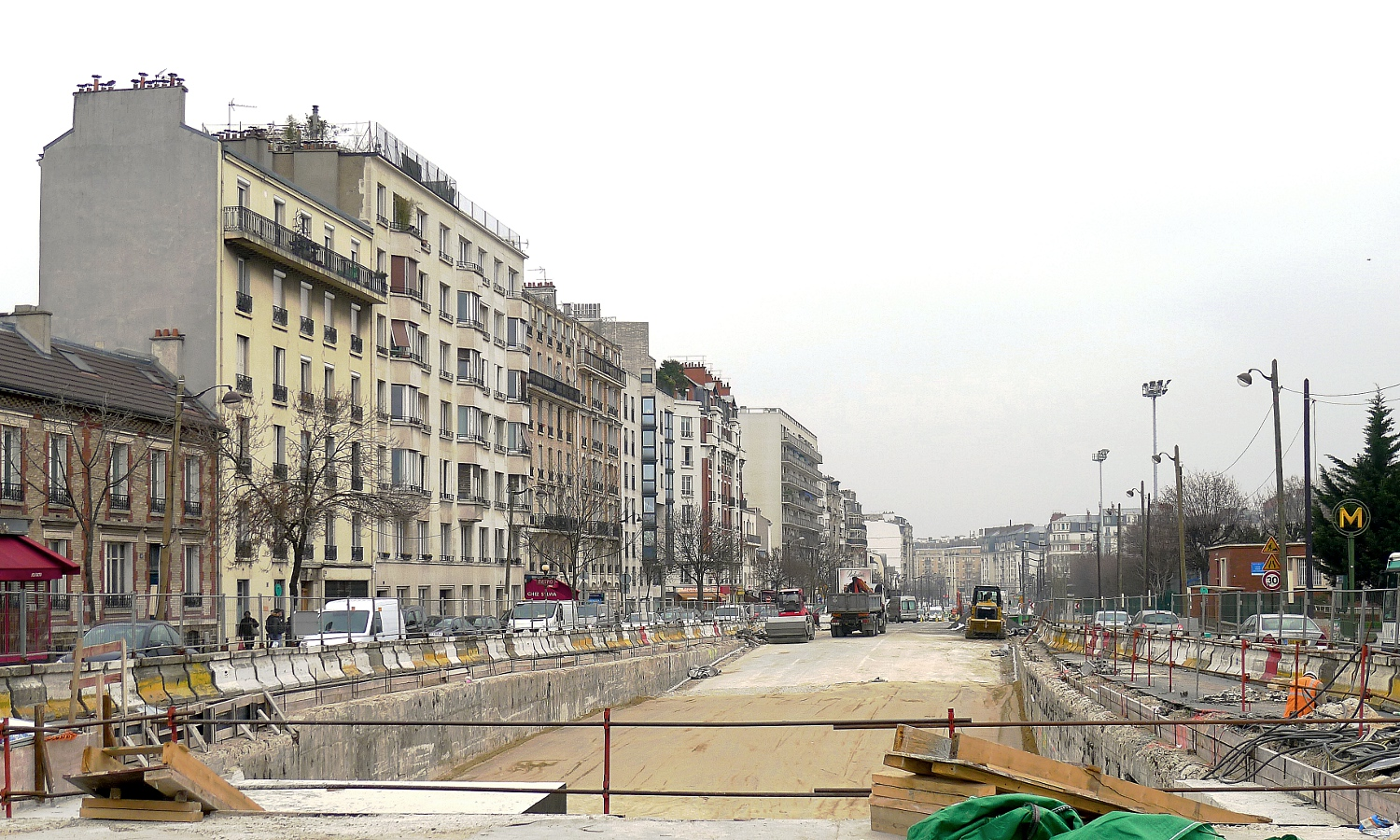
Roadworks in 2011

== Important buildings and historical places ==
- No. 5: La Rapée-Bercy station on the former Petite Ceinture railway line
- No. 117: vestige of the Bastion no. 1 of the Thiers wall
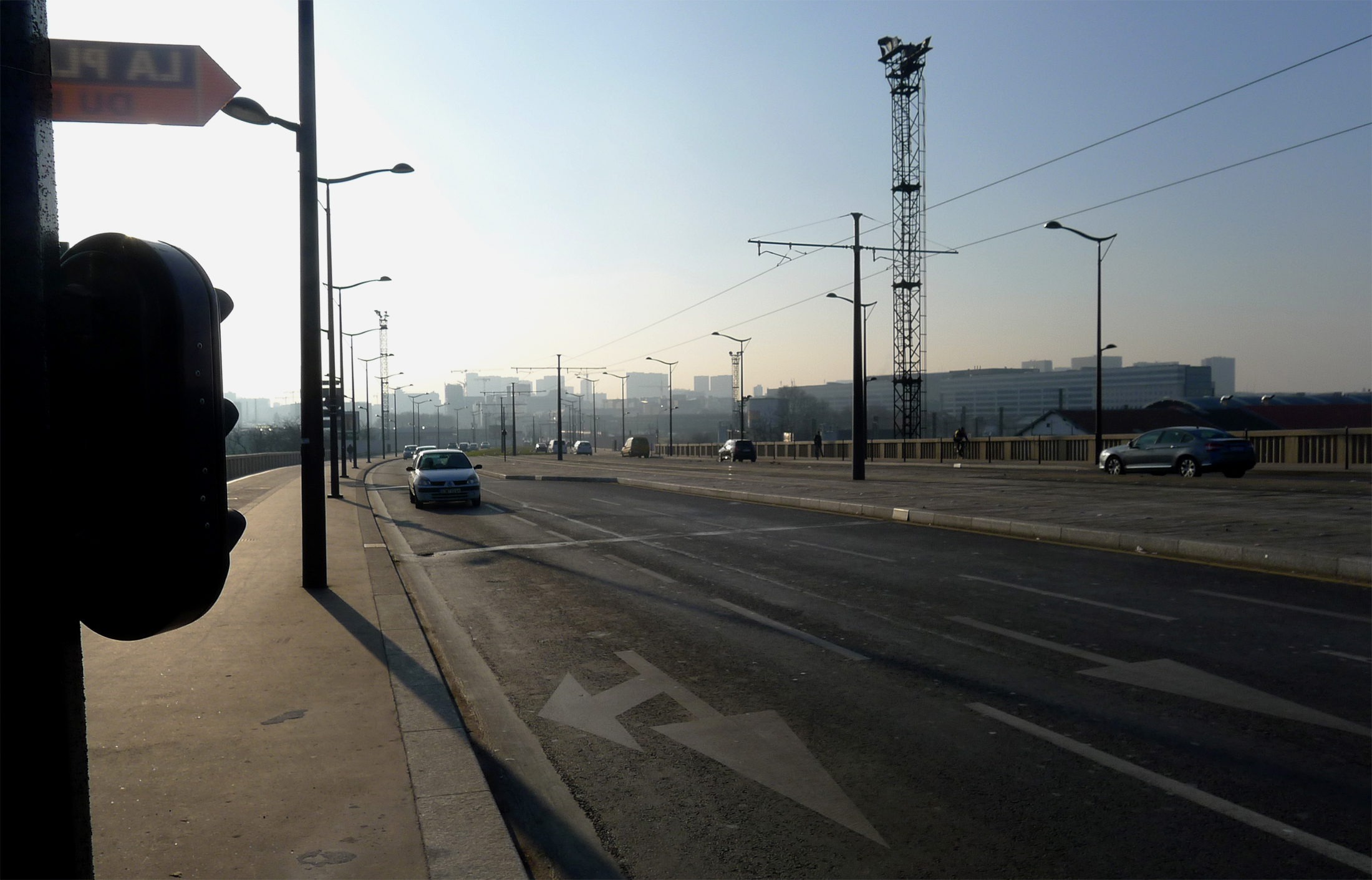
Between the Porte de Charenton and the Porte de Bercy in 2015

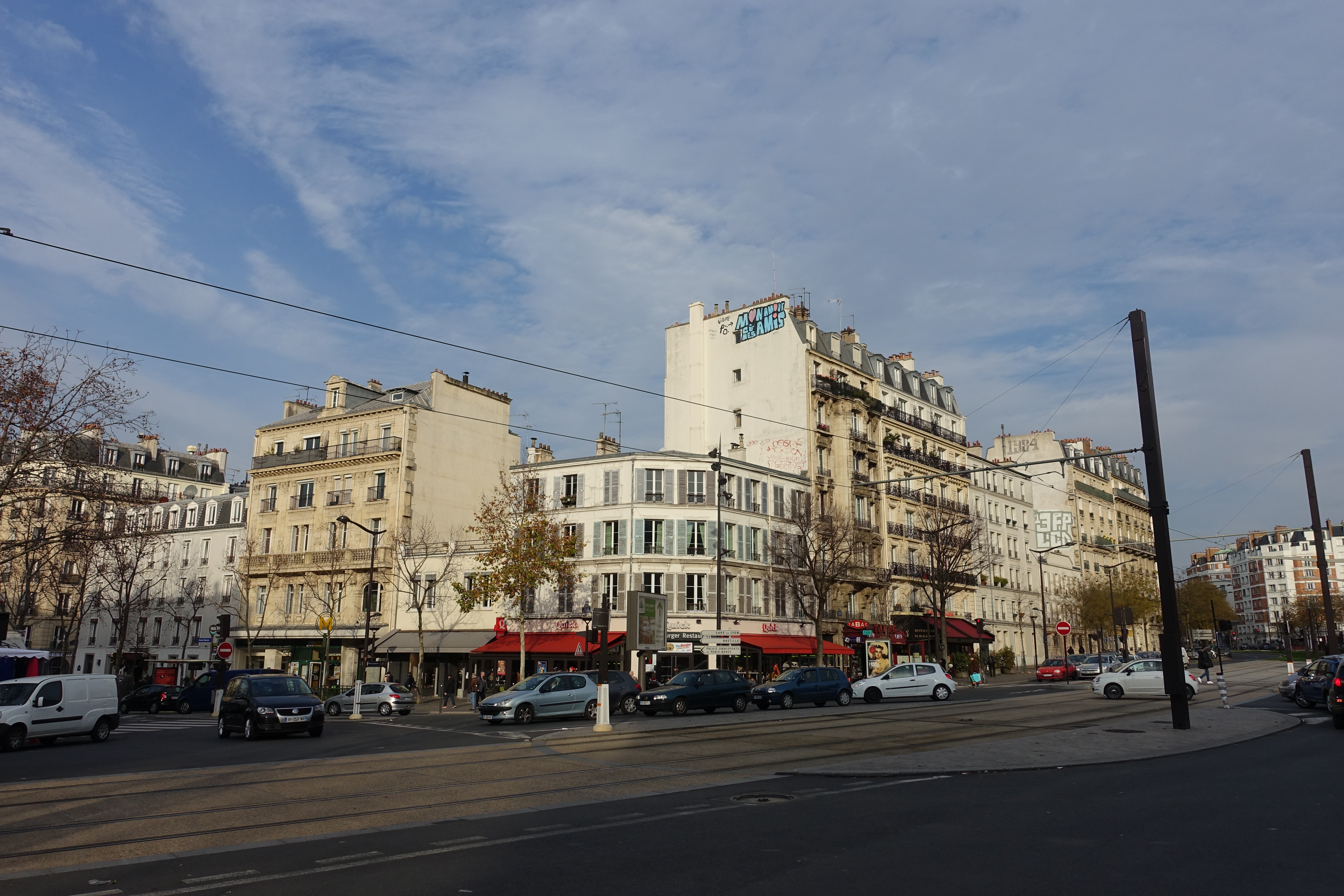

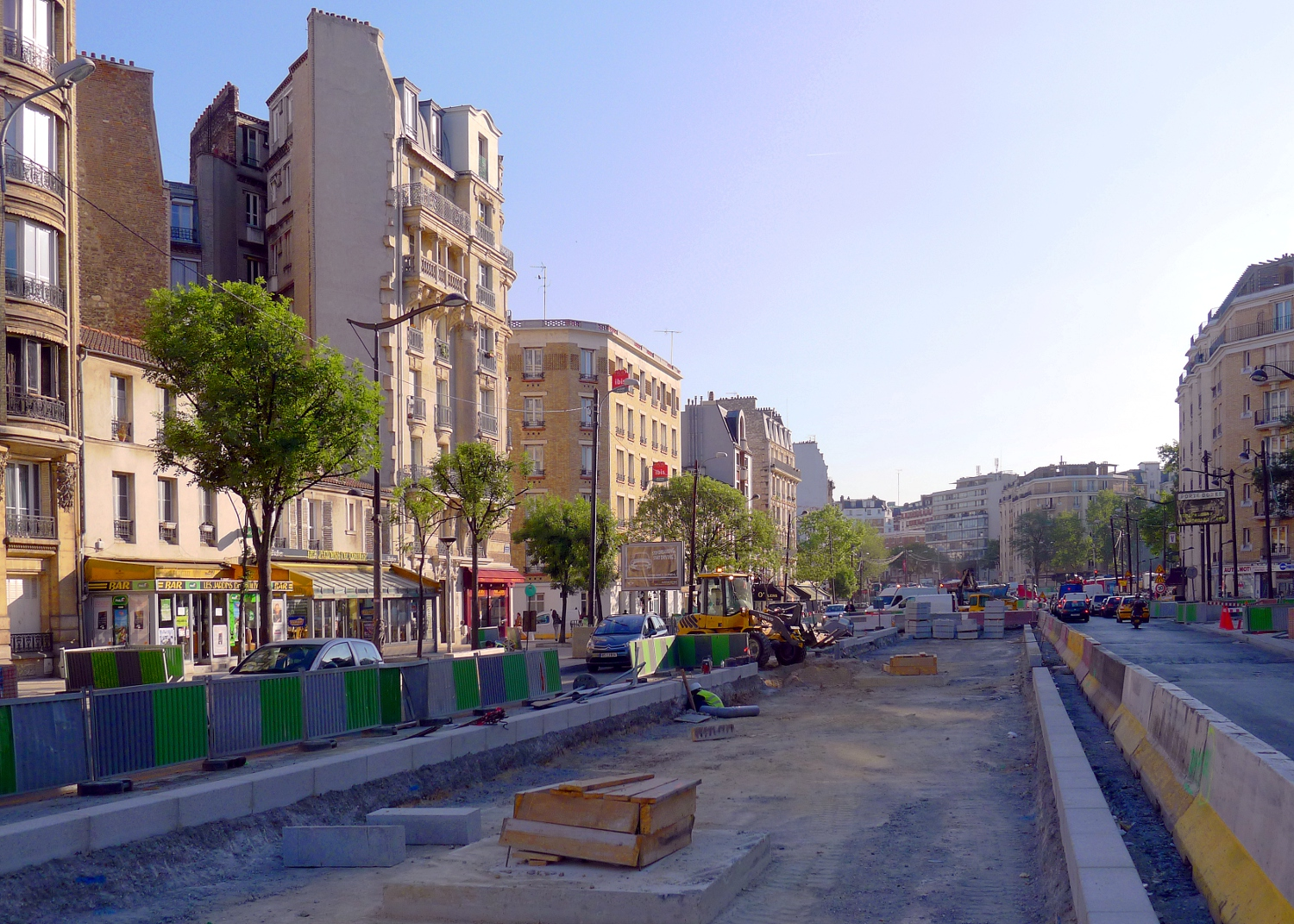
Roadworks for the tramway system

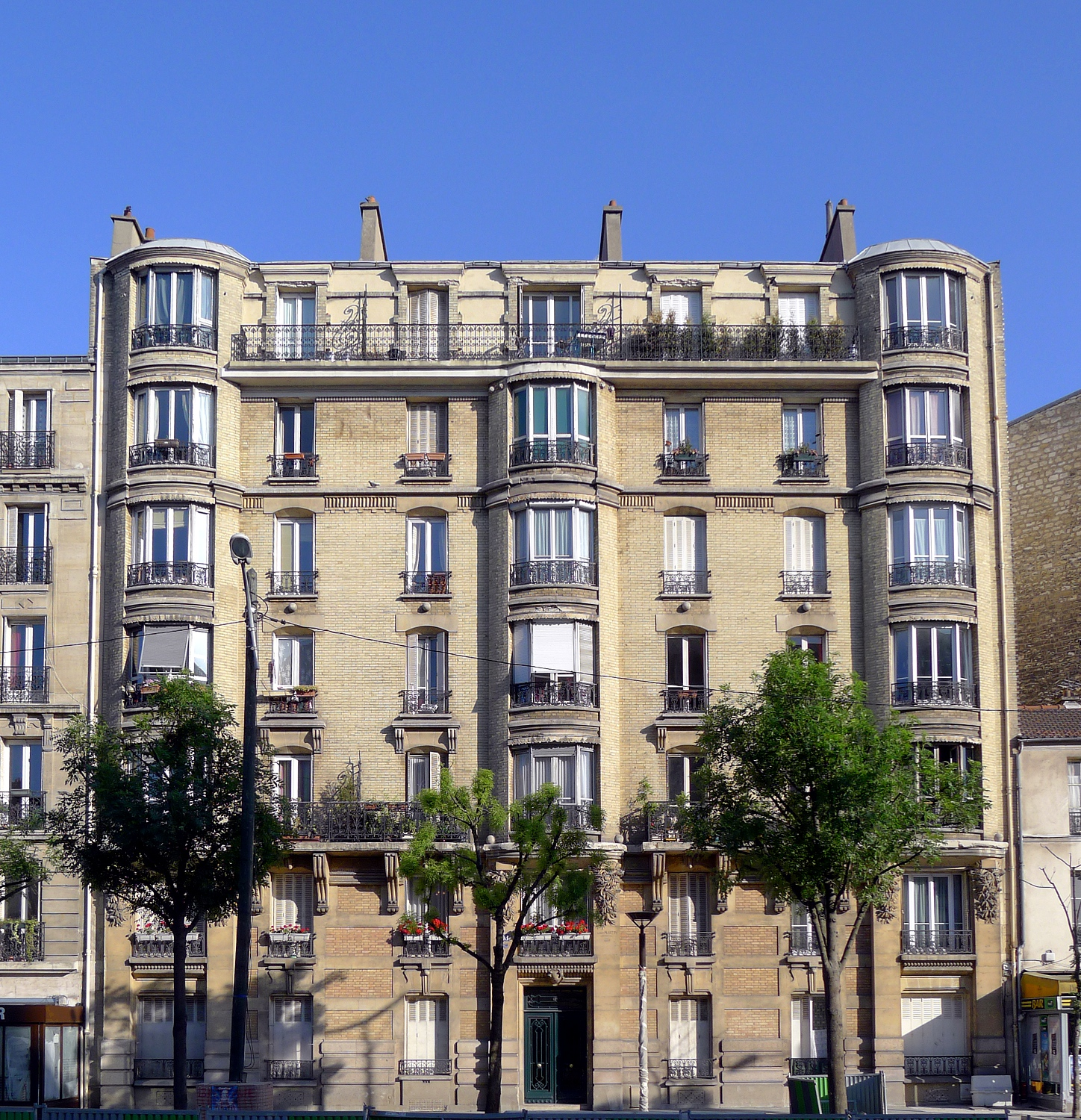
Building

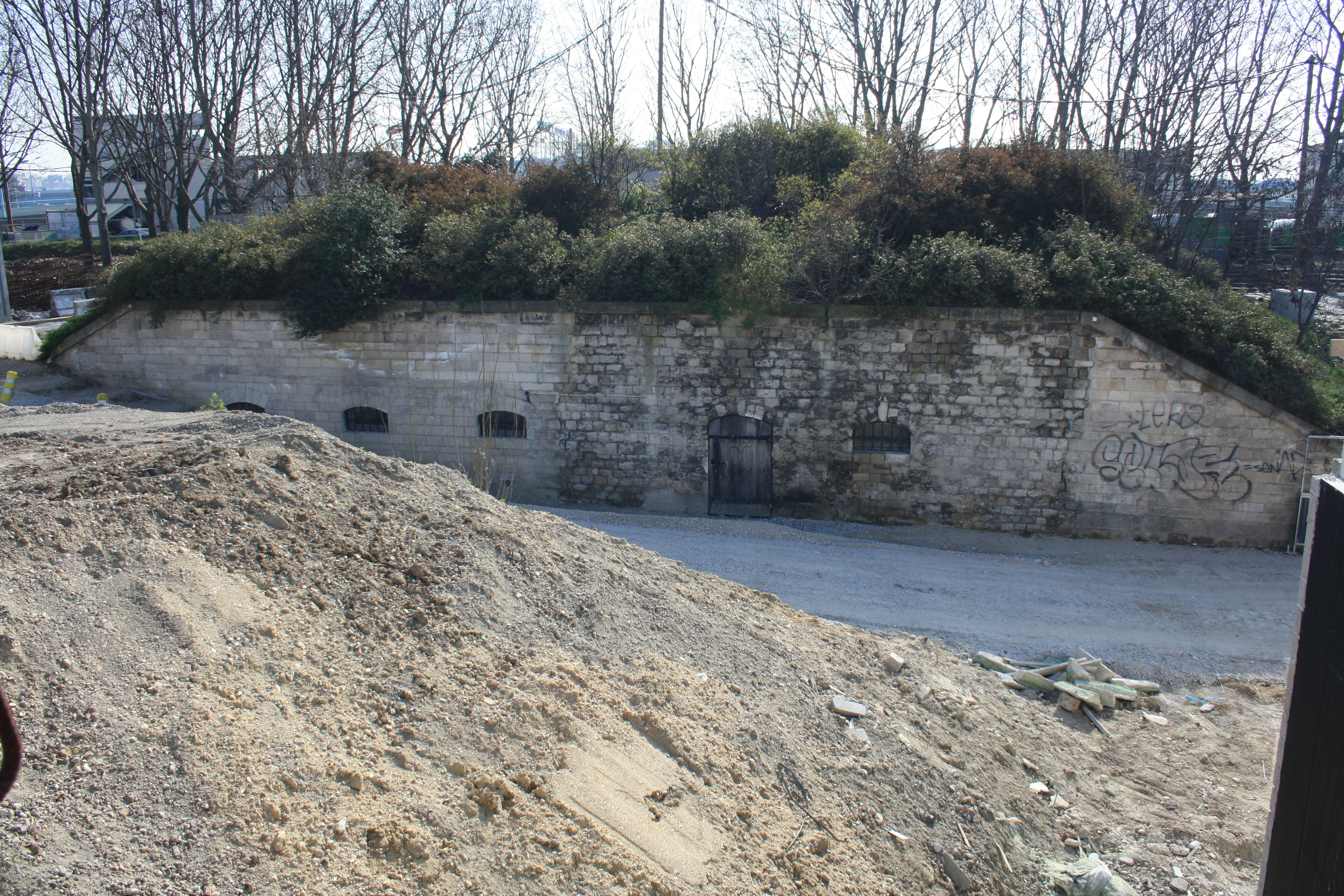
Vestige of the Bastion no. 1 of the Thiers wall.
