= Boulevards of the Marshals =

Thoroughfare in Paris, France

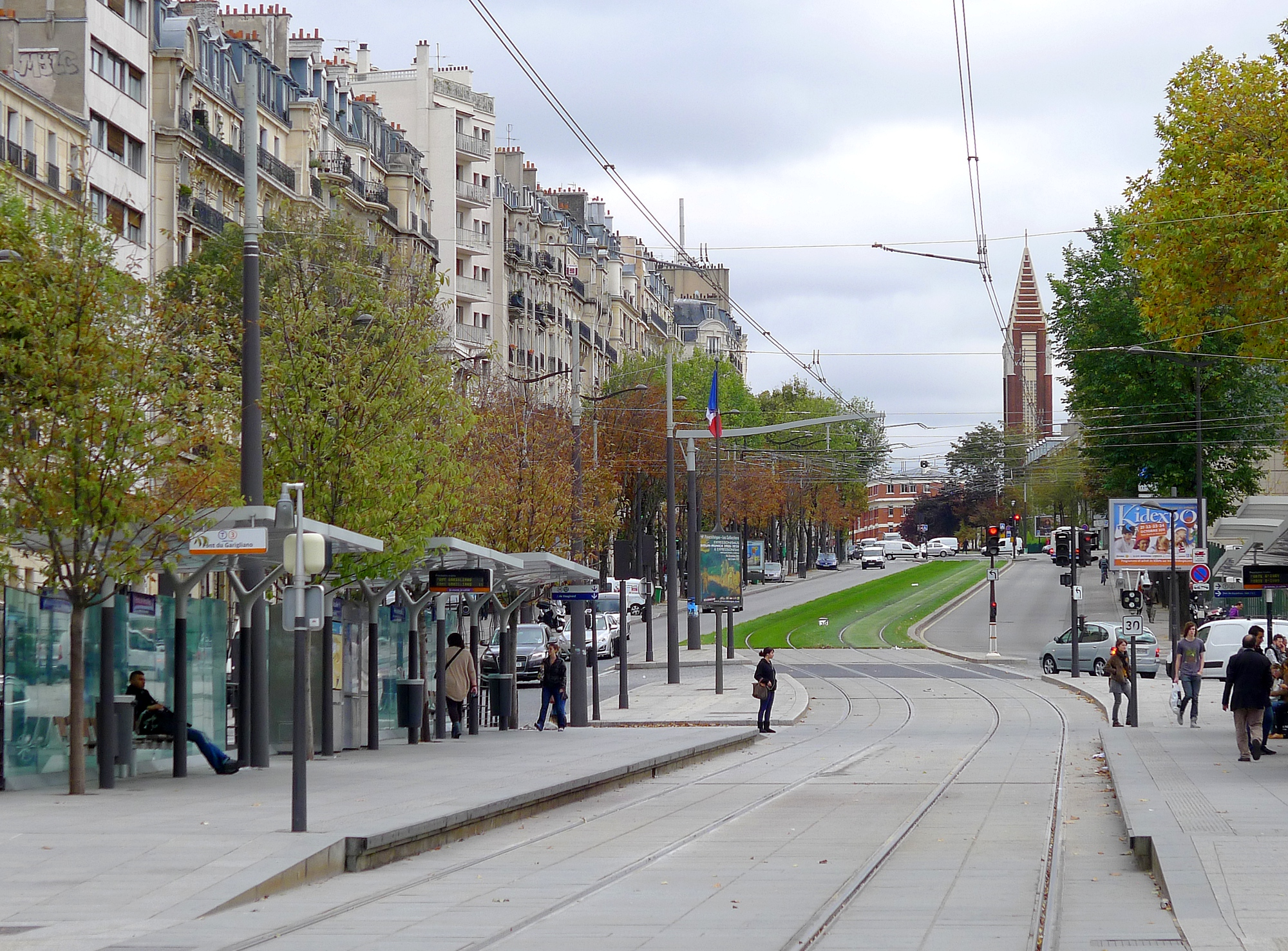
Boulevard Lefebvre

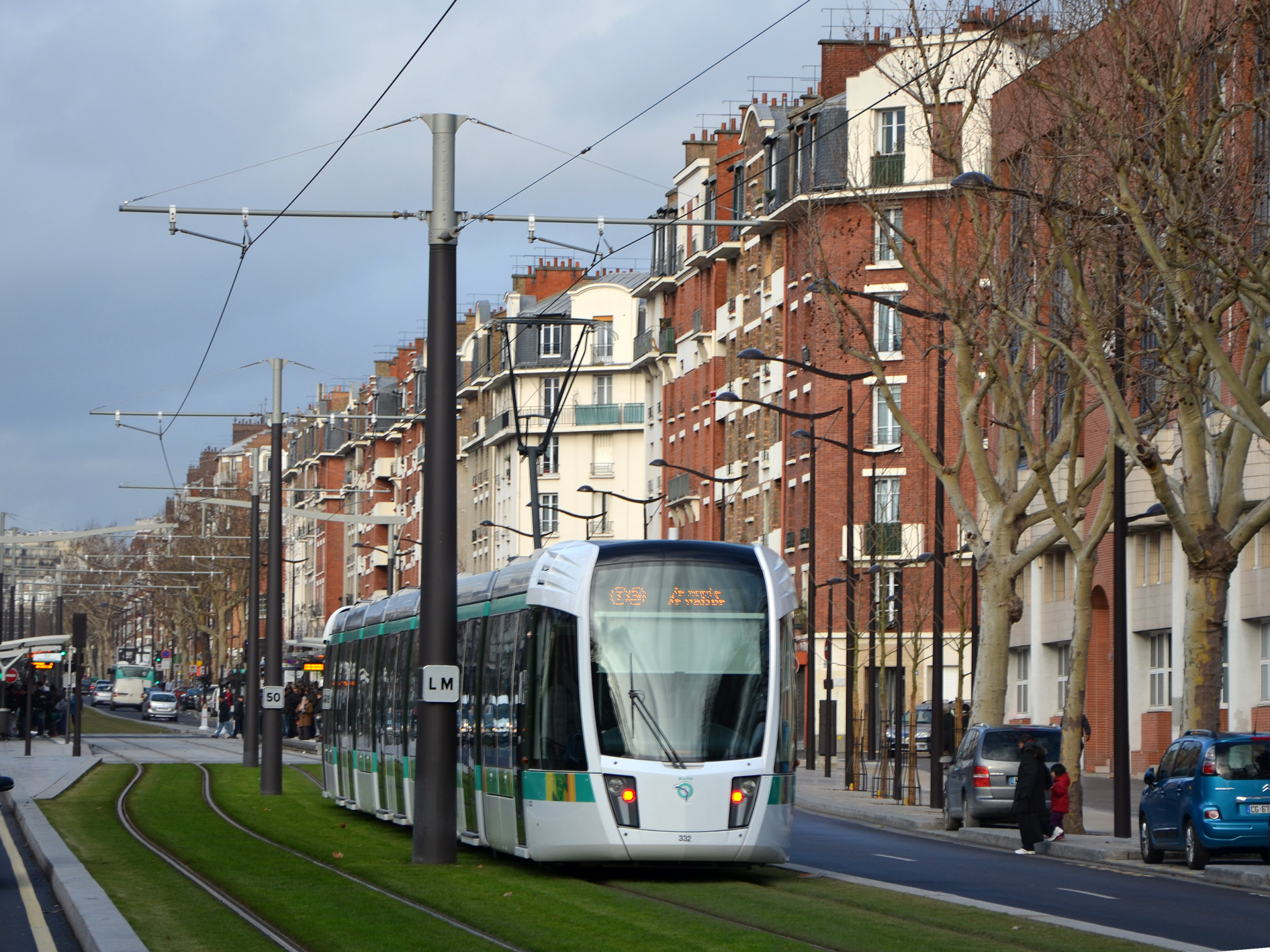
Boulevard Davout

Map of the tramway Lines 3a (orange) and 3b (green), which follow all but a portion of the Boulevards of the Marshals

The Boulevards of the Marshals (French: Boulevards des Maréchaux, pronounced [bulvaʁ de maʁeʃo]) are a series of traffic arteries that together encircle the city of Paris, France, just inside its city limits. Development of the Boulevards began in the 1860s under Napoleon III who named nineteen of them after a Marshal who served under his uncle, Napoleon I. Never officially designated as a thoroughfare, the name came into gradual use during the 20th century as the work was completed and the various segments came to be perceived as a whole.

From 1951 to the early 2000s, the circuit was served by the PC (Petite Ceinture: small beltway) buses. They have since been replaced by the Tramway des Maréchaux (Île-de-France tramway Lines 3a and 3b) except in the 16th arrondissement.

== History ==
The Boulevards of the Marshals occupy the route of the former Rue Militaire (Military Road), built in the 1840s as part of the new Thiers Fortifications which circled Paris. Adjacent to the inner perimeter of the walls and bastions, the Rue was a service road used to transfer soldiers and deliver supplies. During the 1850s, work began on a modern replacement, the Chemin de fer de Petite Ceinture ("Smaller Belt Railway"), its path typically 100 meters further inside, and which in peacetime would transport merchandise and passengers between the capital's six mainline railway stations.

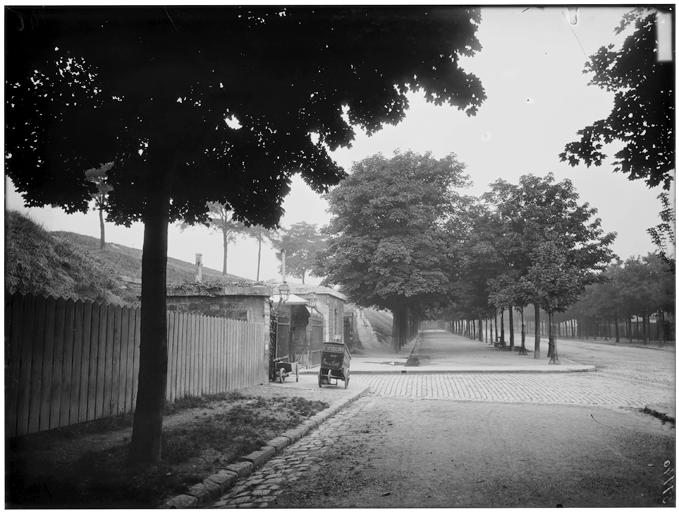
Boulevard Kellerman, adjacent to the fortifications at the Porte de Gentilly, 1910.

Relegated to a secondary role in the city's defense, the Rue Militaire became part of Haussmann's effort to improve Paris’ arterial streets. In 1859 the city obtained from the Army the right to improve and maintain it, with the intention to widen it to six meters, pave it, and build sidewalks. In 1861, after the annexation of the outer districts that expanded the city limits to the fortifications, the city secured authorization to widen the Rue to the standard boulevard forty meters, expropriating civilian property inside the loop if necessary. In 1864, amidst the deluges of new street designations for the city, the Rue Militaire was divided into 19 sections, each a Boulevard named after a Marshal of Napoleon I. Such reflected Napoleon III's practice of anchoring the legitimacy of his regime on the Bonaparte family, particularly his famous uncle. They were to be a “ring road boulevard” (boulevard de ceinture), but no collective name was ever officially given.

Whatever the initial ambitions, only a few short stretches of the military service road were rebuilt as actual boulevards during the Second Empire. However, much work was done on the circuit over the next thirty years with the goal of encouraging development in the less populated outer districts. In 1919 the fortifications were ceded to the city and demolished over the following decade, prompting further improvements of the Boulevards to accommodate anticipated development of the newly available real estate as well as the advent of the automobile. By 1939, all the boulevards had the 20-meter central carriageways envisaged 80 years before. From the 1930s, the Boulevards were served by the PC bus. The range of the automobile and the bus fostered the notion that the segments had become a single, circular thoroughfare comparable to the Grands Boulevards in central Paris, or the Exterior Boulevards whose path was followed by Metro Lines 2 and 6.

After World War II, faced with the sharp growth of automobile usage and growing traffic volume, Paris embraced the motorway. The Boulevards of the Marshals, now heavily used, were quickly judged to be inadequate. Between 1956 and 1973 a new ring-road, the Boulevard Périphérique, was built on the 250 meter-wide field-of-fire belt outside the now-demolished fortifications. A pedestrian-free, limited access motorway designed for high-speed driving, few referred to Le Périph as a boulevard, and it had little in common with its 19th century predecessor. Moreover, as congestion proved unrelenting, the Boulevards of the Marshals were reengineered in an effort to permit their traffic to approach motorway speeds and volume: widening the carriageway, reducing the number of traffic lights and pedestrian crossings, and building underpasses under major intersections.

In the closing years of the 20th century, Paris began changing its automobile policies, including restricting parking, promoting mass transit and cycling, and redesigning its traffic arteries. In the early 2000s, much of the Boulevards of the Marshals were rebuilt to create a more pedestrian-friendly environment, focused on new tramways along 85% of its circuit. The stated objectives of the tramway and the latest remake of the Boulevards were to provide more public transport capacity than the PC buses, reduce the presence of cars and related services, reclaim public space, stimulate commercial and community life, and narrow the livability gap as compared with Paris’ poorer suburbs.

== The Boulevards and the Marshals ==
The Boulevards of the Marshals concept was adulterated just as it was coming to fruition. In 1932, during a period of renewed attention to the French Navy, a section of Boulevard Lannes was renamed Boulevard de l’Amiral Bruix. Étienne Eustache Bruix was a high-ranking naval officer and administrator under the Directory and Consulate, but not a marshal or its naval equivalent. In 1987, a section of Boulevard Victor was renamed Boulevard du Général-Martial-Valin. Valin was commander of the Free French air force, a hero of the liberation of Paris, and served in other high military posts until the 1960s. In 2005, a section of Boulevard Masséna was renamed the Boulevard du General-Jean-Simon. Simon had a distinguished military career with the Free French and the postwar army, and in the late 20th century was a prominent figure in various civic and military associations honoring the Liberation. Neither Valin nor Simon was granted the distinction of Marshal.

The Boulevards never included all 26 of Napoleon's marshals. Seven were omitted from the new names that his nephew bestowed on the Rue Militaire in 1864. Four were straightforward. Napoleon himself had removed Pierre Augereau, Auguste de Marmont, and Catherine-Dominique de Pérignon from the list of marshals during the Hundred Days. Charles-Jean-Baptiste Bernadotte presumably ceased to be a French marshal when he became Crown Prince of Sweden in 1810 (and he later joined the Sixth Coalition that defeated Napoleon).

As for the others, Emmanuel de Grouchy, to whom Napoleon granted the title in 1815 for helping him return to power and was afterwards proscribed by the Bourbons, was vilified by the Bonapartists for his fateful decisions at the Battle of Waterloo. Bon-Adrien Jeannot de Moncey and Nicolas Charles Marie Oudinot already had Paris streets named for them -- rue Moncey in the 9th arr (1844) and rue Oudinot in the 7th arr (1851) -- but these were minor streets whose names could easily have been changed again had they been given a boulevard segment. Neither man had rejoined Napoleon during the Hundred Days, but neither had MacDonald, Massena, Suchet and Victor.

One of the omitted marshals, Pierre Augereau, who burned his political bridges with both the Bourbons and the Bonapartists during the regime changes of 1814-15, nonetheless today has his name on a Paris street: rue Augereau in the 7th arr, in 1894 a private street renamed by its proprietors.

== List of boulevards ==
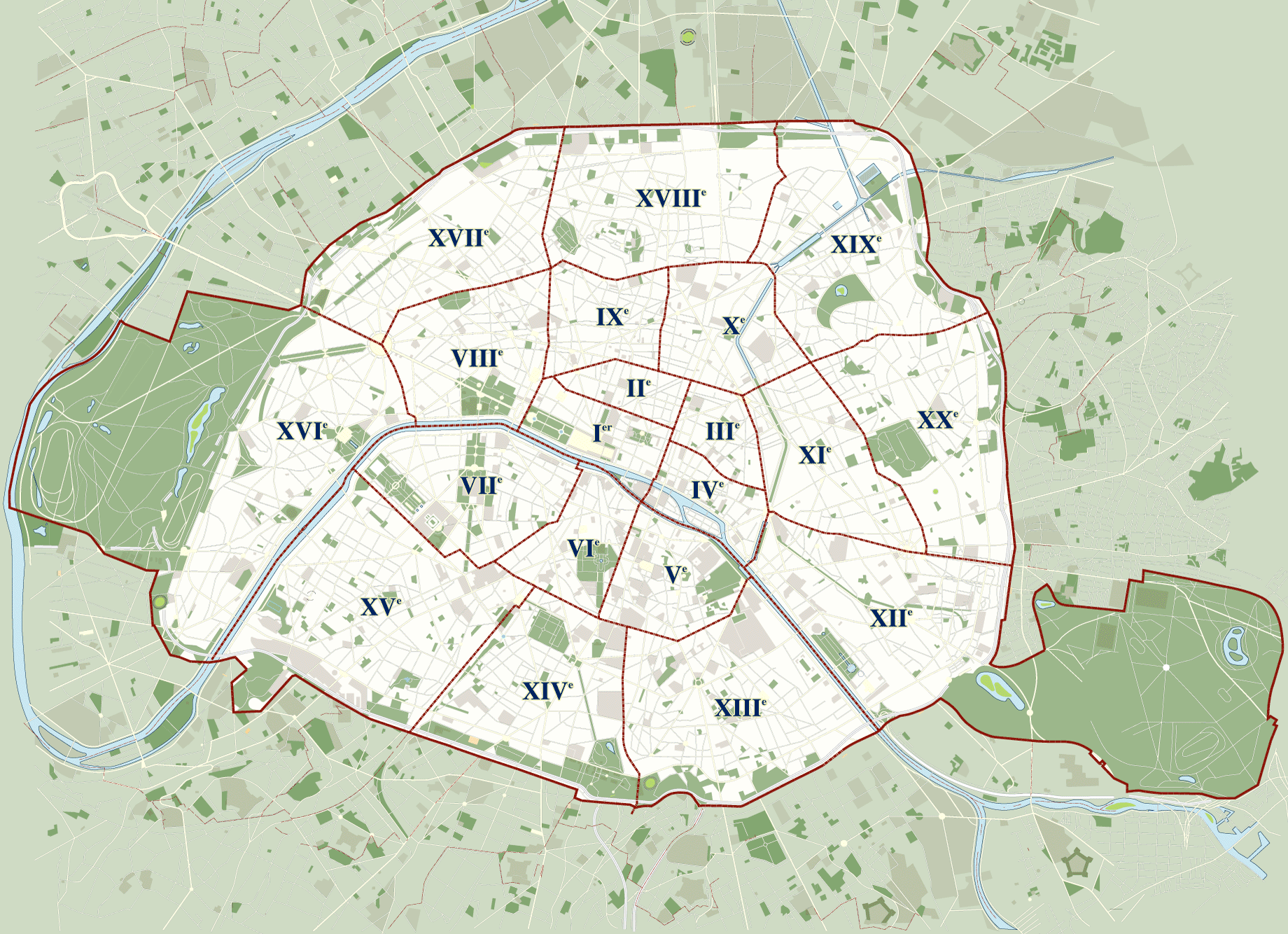
Map of Paris showing its arrondissements

The list below starts at the Porte de Vincennes and continues in ascending numerical order of arrondissements, from the 12th to the 20th; in effect, around Paris in clockwise fashion, beginning from the 3:00 position. Also noted are the connections of each to the Paris Métro, the Réseau Express Régional (RER), the Paris Tramway Line 3, the city gates of Paris, and the main roads leaving the capital for adjacent communes.

Legend:

Paris Metro Paris Metro Line 1	: métro station, line 1.
RER RER B	: RER station, line B.
Tramways in Île-de-France Île-de-France tramway Line 3a Île-de-France tramway Line 3b	: tramway stop, line 3.

Arrondissement	Boulevard	Porte	Trunk roads	Border communes
12th	Boulevard Soult	Porte de Vincennes – –	route nationale 34	Saint-Mandé
12th	Boulevard Soult	Porte de Saint-Mandé –	route nationale 34	Saint-Mandé
12th	Boulevard Soult	Porte de Montempoivre –	route nationale 34	Saint-Mandé
12th	Boulevard Soult	Porte Dorée – –	route nationale 34	Saint-Mandé
12th	Boulevard Poniatowski	Porte Dorée – –	route nationale 34	Bois de Vincennes
12th	Boulevard Poniatowski	Porte de Reuilly –	route nationale 34	Bois de Vincennes
12th	Boulevard Poniatowski	Porte de Charenton – –	route nationale 6	Bois de Vincennes
12th	Boulevard Poniatowski	Porte de Charenton – –	route nationale 6	Charenton-le-Pont
12th	Boulevard Poniatowski	Porte de Bercy –	A4 autoroute	Charenton-le-Pont
Seine	Pont National			
13th	Boulevard du Général-Jean-Simon	Porte de la Gare –		Ivry-sur-Seine
13th	Boulevard du Général-Jean-Simon	Porte de Vitry –		Ivry-sur-Seine
13th	Boulevard Masséna	Porte de Vitry –		Ivry-sur-Seine
13th	Boulevard Masséna	Porte d'Ivry – –		Ivry-sur-Seine
13th	Boulevard Masséna	Porte de Choisy – –	route nationale 305	Ivry-sur-Seine
13th	Boulevard Masséna	Porte d'Italie – –	route nationale 7	Le Kremlin-Bicêtre
13th	Boulevard Kellermann	Porte d'Italie – –	A6b	Le Kremlin-Bicêtre
13th		Poterne des Peupliers –	A6b	Gentilly
13th		Porte de Gentilly – –		Gentilly
14th	Boulevard Jourdan	Porte de Gentilly – –		Gentilly
14th	Boulevard Jourdan	Porte de Gentilly – –	A6a	Gentilly
14th	Boulevard Jourdan	Porte d'Arcueil –	A6a	Gentilly
14th	Boulevard Jourdan	Porte d'Arcueil –		Montrouge
14th	Boulevard Jourdan	Porte d'Orléans – –	route nationale 20	Montrouge
14th	Boulevard Brune	Porte d'Orléans – –	route nationale 20	Montrouge
14th	Boulevard Brune	Porte de Montrouge	route nationale 20	Montrouge
14th	Boulevard Brune	Porte de Châtillon –	route nationale 20	Montrouge
14th	Boulevard Brune	Porte de Châtillon –	route nationale 20	Malakoff
14th	Boulevard Brune	Porte Didot –	route nationale 20	Malakoff
14th	Boulevard Brune	Porte de Vanves – –	route nationale 20	Malakoff
15th	Boulevard Lefebvre	Porte Brancion –	route nationale 20	Vanves
15th	Boulevard Lefebvre	Porte de Plaisance et Porte de la Plaine –	route nationale 20	Vanves
15th	Boulevard Lefebvre	Porte de Versailles – –	route nationale 20	Issy-les-Moulineaux
15th	Boulevard Victor	Porte de Versailles – –	route nationale 20	Issy-les-Moulineaux
15th	Boulevard Victor	Porte d'Issy-les-Moulineaux –	route nationale 20	Issy-les-Moulineaux
15th	Boulevard Victor	Porte de Sèvres – –	route nationale 20	Issy-les-Moulineaux
15th	Boulevard du Général-Martial-Valin	Porte de Sèvres – –	route nationale 20	Issy-les-Moulineaux
15th	Boulevard du Général-Martial-Valin	–	route nationale 20	Issy-les-Moulineaux
Seine	Pont du Garigliano			
16th	Bois de Boulogne	Porte de Boulogne		Boulogne-Billancourt
16th	Bois de Boulogne	Porte de l'Hippodrome		Boulogne-Billancourt
16th	Bois de Boulogne	Porte de la Seine		
16th	Bois de Boulogne	Porte de Madrid		
16th	Bois de Boulogne	Porte Saint-James		
16th	Bois de Boulogne	Porte de Neuilly		
16th	Bois de Boulogne	Porte des Sablons		
16th	Boulevard Murat	Porte du Point-du-Jour		Boulogne-Billancourt
16th	Boulevard Murat	Porte de Saint-Cloud –	route nationale 10	Boulogne-Billancourt
16th		Porte Molitor –		Boulogne-Billancourt
16th		Porte Molitor –		Bois de Boulogne
16th		Porte d'Auteuil –	A13 autoroute	Bois de Boulogne
16th	Boulevard Suchet	Porte d'Auteuil –	A13 autoroute	Bois de Boulogne
16th	Boulevard Suchet	Porte de Passy		Bois de Boulogne
16th	Boulevard Suchet	Porte de la Muette		Bois de Boulogne
16th	Boulevard Lannes	Porte de la Muette		Bois de Boulogne
16th	Boulevard Lannes	Porte Dauphine – –		Bois de Boulogne
16th	Boulevard de l'Amiral-Bruix	Porte Dauphine – –		Bois de Boulogne
16th	Boulevard de l'Amiral-Bruix	Porte Maillot – –	route nationale 13	Bois de Boulogne
17th	Boulevard Gouvion-Saint-Cyr	Porte Maillot – –	route nationale 13	Neuilly-sur-Seine
17th	Boulevard Gouvion-Saint-Cyr	Porte des Ternes		Neuilly-sur-Seine
17th	Boulevard Gouvion-Saint-Cyr	Porte de Villiers		Neuilly-sur-Seine
17th	Boulevard Gouvion-Saint-Cyr	Porte de Villiers		Levallois-Perret
17th	Boulevard Gouvion-Saint-Cyr	Porte de Champerret – –		Levallois-Perret
17th	Boulevard Berthier	Porte de Champerret – –		Levallois-Perret
17th	Boulevard Berthier	Porte de Courcelles		Levallois-Perret
17th	Boulevard Berthier	Porte d'Asnières –		Levallois-Perret
17th	Boulevard Berthier	Porte de Clichy – – –		Clichy
17th	Boulevard Bessières	Porte de Clichy – – –		Clichy
17th	Boulevard Bessières	Porte Pouchet –		Saint-Ouen –
17th	Boulevard Bessières	Porte de Saint-Ouen –		Saint-Ouen –
18th	Boulevard Ney	Porte de Saint-Ouen –		Saint-Ouen –
18th	Boulevard Ney	Porte Montmartre –		Saint-Ouen –
18th	Boulevard Ney	Porte de Clignancourt – –	route nationale 14	Saint-Ouen –
18th	Boulevard Ney	Porte des Poissonniers –	route nationale 14	Saint-Ouen –
18th	Boulevard Ney	Porte des Poissonniers –	route nationale 14	Saint-Denis
18th	Boulevard Ney	Porte de la Chapelle – –	Route nationale 1 et A1 autoroute	Saint-Denis
18th	Boulevard Ney	Porte d'Aubervilliers –	route nationale 301	Aubervilliers
19th	Boulevard Macdonald	Porte d'Aubervilliers –	route nationale 301	Aubervilliers
19th	Boulevard Macdonald	Canal Saint-Denis		
19th	Boulevard Macdonald	Porte de la Villette – –	Route nationale 2	
19th	Boulevard Macdonald	Porte de la Villette – –	Route nationale 2	Pantin
19th	Boulevard Macdonald	Canal de l'Ourcq		
19th	Boulevard Sérurier	Canal de l'Ourcq		
19th	Boulevard Sérurier	Porte de Pantin – –	Route nationale 3	
19th		Porte de Pantin – –	Route nationale 3	Le Pré-Saint-Gervais
19th		Porte Chaumont –	Route nationale 3	Le Pré-Saint-Gervais
19th		Porte Brunet –	Route nationale 3	Le Pré-Saint-Gervais
19th		Porte du Pré-Saint-Gervais – –	Route nationale 3	Le Pré-Saint-Gervais
19th		Porte des Lilas – –	Route nationale 3	Le Pré-Saint-Gervais
20th	Boulevard Mortier	Porte des Lilas – –	Route nationale 3	Les Lilas
20th	Boulevard Mortier	Porte de Ménilmontant –	Route nationale 3	Bagnolet
20th	Boulevard Mortier	Porte de Bagnolet – –	A3 autoroute	Bagnolet
20th	Boulevard Davout	Porte de Bagnolet – –	A3 autoroute	Bagnolet
20th	Boulevard Davout	Porte de Montreuil – –	route nationale 302	Montreuil
20th	Boulevard Davout	Porte de Vincennes – –	route nationale 302	Montreuil
20th	Boulevard Davout	Porte de Vincennes – –	route nationale 302	Saint-Mandé

== Transportation ==
The speed limit on the boulevards is generally 50 km/h. They do not constitute an expressway or limited-access motorway in the fashion of the Boulevard Périphérique.

The Paris Tramway (Ile-de-France) covers most of the Boulevards of the Marshals, with two lines sharing a terminus at Porte the Vincennes. Line 3a follows the boulevards along the southern half of the circuit, while line 3b follows the northern circuit. There is no tramway on a section of the route near the Bois de Boulogne, between the Pont du Garigliano and Porte Dauphine. That section is covered by the last surviving PC bus route. Bicycle lanes have been installed along parts of the Boulevards.

== Places of interest ==
Some specific sites near the boulevards are:

- Bois de Boulogne
- Bois de Vincennes and the Throne carnival
- Cité Internationale Universitaire de Paris
- City of Science and Industry
- Heliport de Paris - Issy-les-Moulineaux
- Hôpital Européen Georges-Pompidou
- Robert Debré Pediatric Hospital
- Marmottan Museum
- Palais des Sports de Paris
- Parc André Citroën
- Parc de la Butte du Chapeau-Rouge
- The Fairgrounds at the Versailles gate
- Parc Georges Brassens
- Parc Kellermann
- Parc Montsouris
- Parc des Princes
- Stade Charlety

== See also ==
- Ring road
- City gates of Paris
- Louis Alexandre Berthier
- Jean-Baptiste Bessières
- Guillaume Marie Anne Brune
- Louis-Nicolas Davout
- Laurent de Gouvion Saint-Cyr
- Jean-Baptiste Jourdan
- François Christophe de Kellermann
- Jean Lannes
- François Joseph Lefebvre
- Jacques MacDonald
- André Masséna
- Édouard Adolphe Casimir Joseph Mortier
- Joachim Murat
- Michel Ney
- Józef Antoni Poniatowski
- Jean-Mathieu-Philibert Sérurier
- Jean-de-Dieu Soult
- Louis Gabriel Suchet
- Claude Victor-Perrin, Duc de Belluno
