= Boulevard Mortier =

Street in Paris, France

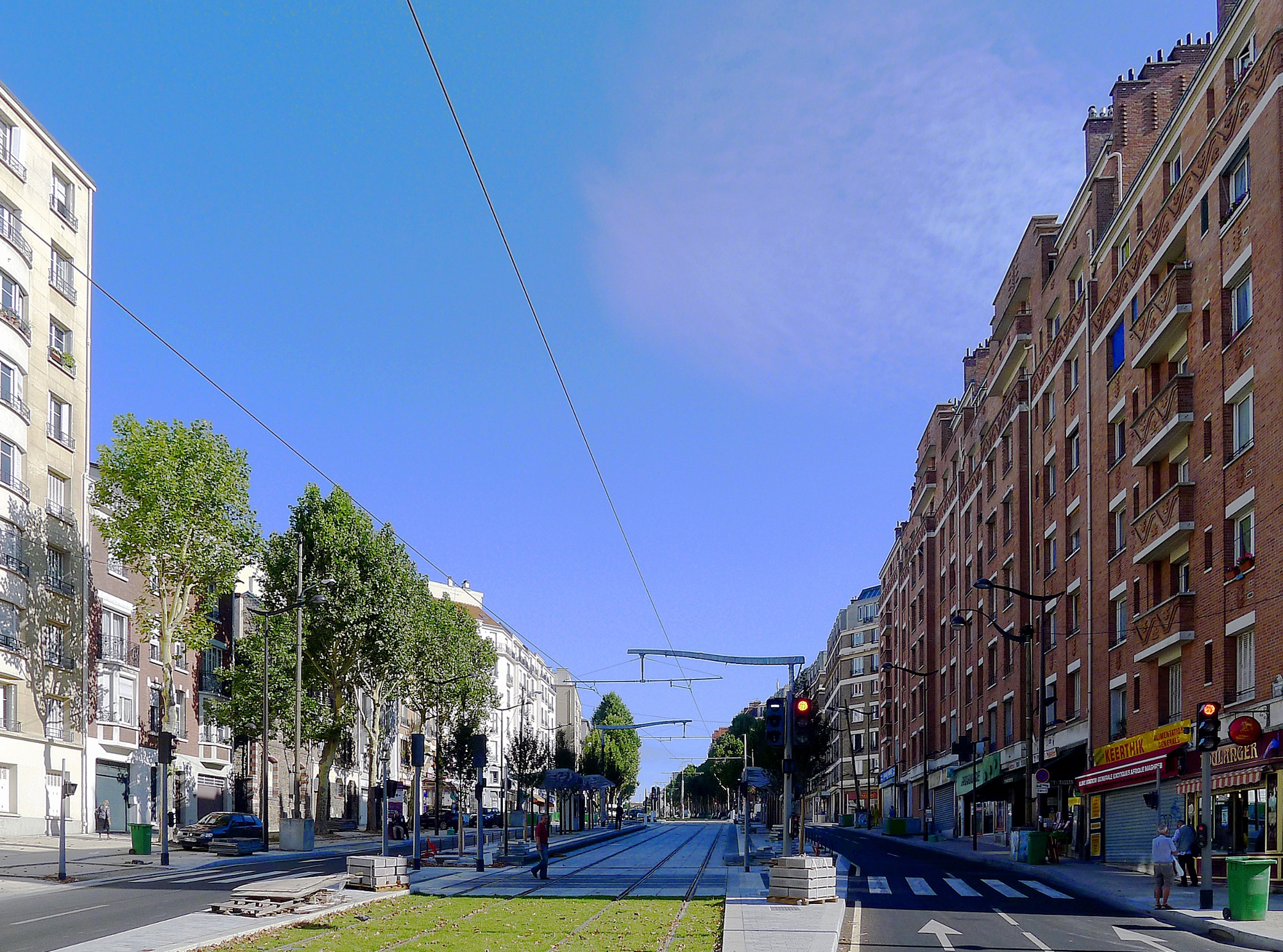

- Location within Paris
- Namesake: Édouard Mortier
- Length: 1,350 m (4,430 ft)
- Width: 37.50 m (123.0 ft) to 40 m (130 ft)
- Arrondissement: 20th
- Quarter: Charonne
- Coordinates: 48°52′15″N 2°24′31″E
- From: Porte de Bagnolet
- To: Porte des Lilas, Paris

Construction
- Completion: 1863
- Denomination: 2 March 1864

The Boulevard Mortier (French pronunciation: [bulvaʁ mɔʁtje]) is a boulevard in the 20th arrondissement of Paris, France. It is one of the Boulevards of the Marshals, which circle the outer parts of the city.

== Route ==
The boulevard starts at the Porte de Bagnolet and ends at the Porte des Lilas, where it is continued by the Boulevard Sérurier. The housing estate Campagne à Paris is located on the west side, near the Porte de Bagnolet.

The boulevard was accessible through the Petite Ceinture bus line. Now it can be reached through the Métro Line 3.

== History ==
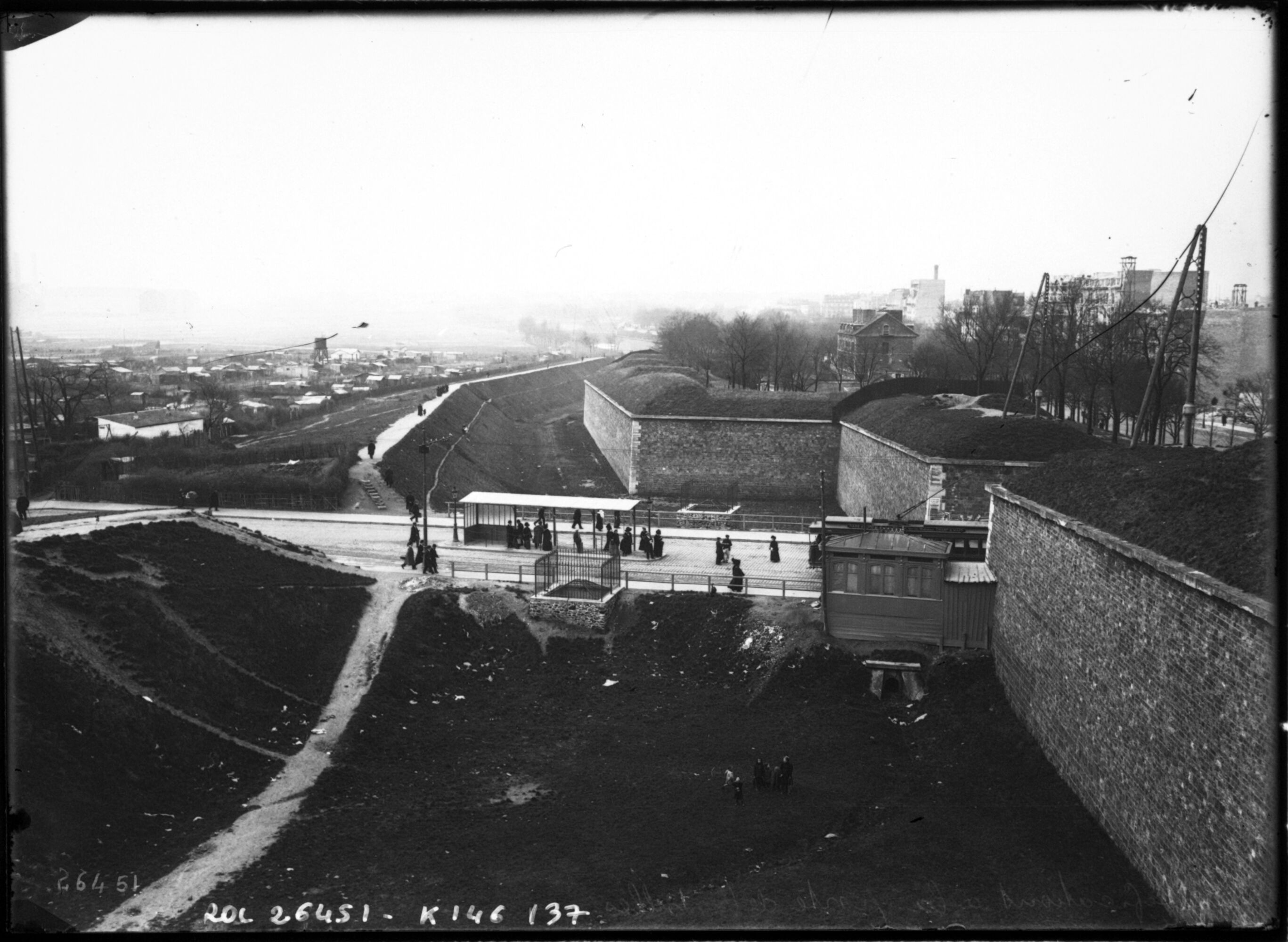
A portion of the Thiers wall, the military structure and moat that later was replaced by the various Boulevards of the Marshals.

The French war department had completed the Thiers wall – including fortifications, a dry moat, a Rue Militaire and a large berm – around 1840. In 1859, the military engineering service gave conditional control to the Paris city council. The expansion of the land area of Paris in 1860, by annexing bordering communities, created a situation where everything within the Thiers wall was Paris and everything without was not. The Thiers wall, with its accompanying berm and moat, led to a profound disruption and complication of the synergistic relationship between Paris and its suburbs. Paris city council started upgrading and conversion of some sections of the Rue Militaire into boulevards in 1861, with the (yet unnamed) Boulevard de Mortier one of the first stretches to open.

In 1864, the boulevard was named after Édouard Mortier (1768–1835), Duke of Trévise and Marshal of France.

Each section of the upgraded Rue Militaire was then named for a marshal of the First French Empire (1804–1814) who served under Napoleon I, leading to the entire ring being collectively called the Boulevards of the Marshals. The Boulevards of the Marshals concept was almost fully realized by 1932, though the final three sections, closing the ring, would not be completed until 2005. Of the 22 boulevards, 19 have been named for Mortier or one of his fellow First Empire marshals.

== Important building ==
- After no. 19 is the Rue Camille-Bombois, a narrow street with a stairway that goes up to the Rue Irénée-Blanc; it belongs to the Campagne à Paris estate.
- On 24 August 1944, the group Francs-Tireurs et Partisans of Saint-Fargeau attacked an SS row at a barricade located at no. 67, at the crossing of the Boulevard Mortier and the Rue de la Justice.
- The Communist politician Jacques Duclos is said to have resided at nos. 82–88 in July 1940.
- No 141: Caserne des Tourelles, headquarters of the Directorate-General for External Security (DGSE).
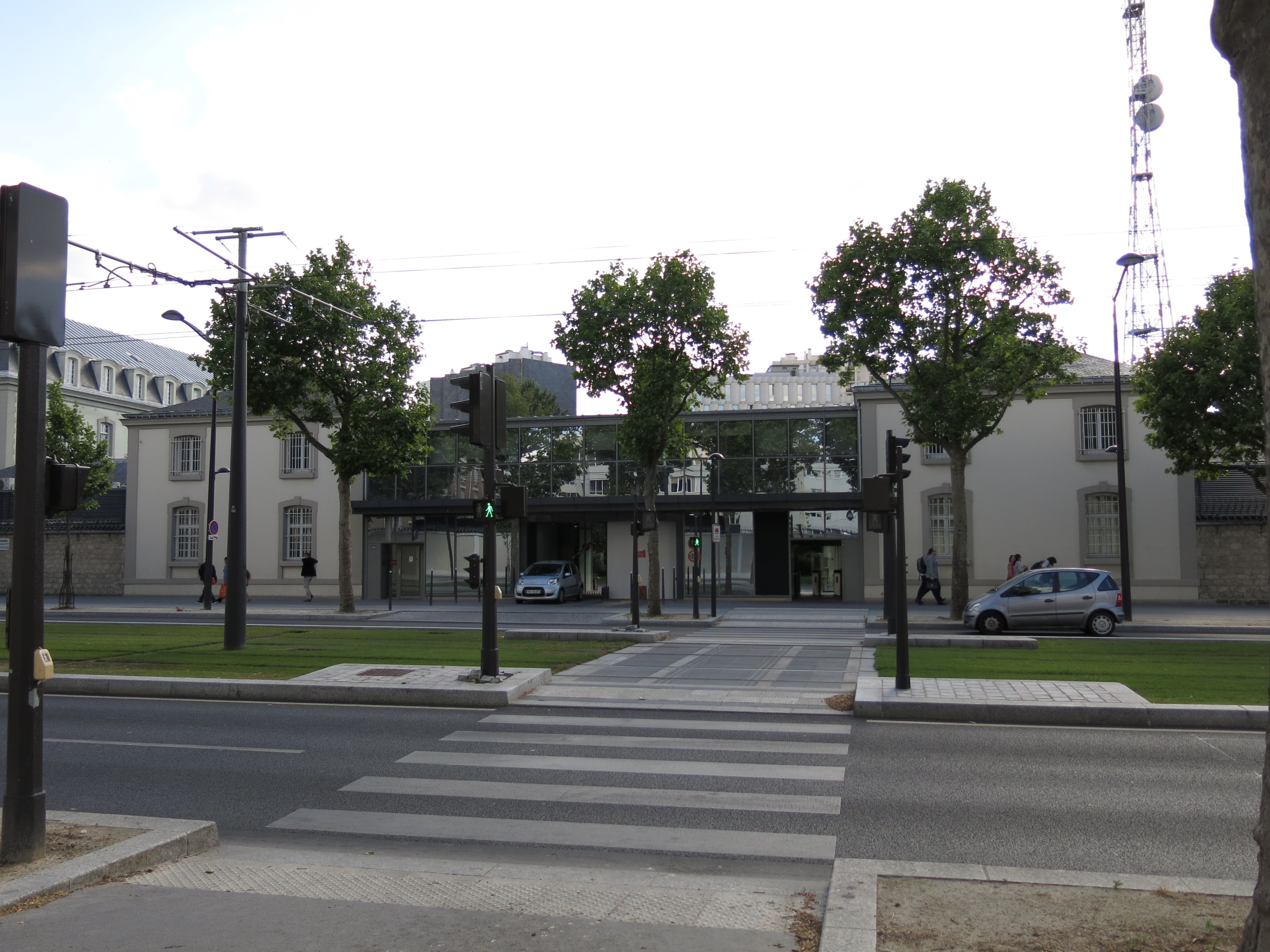
Caserne des Tourelles, headquarters of the DGSE

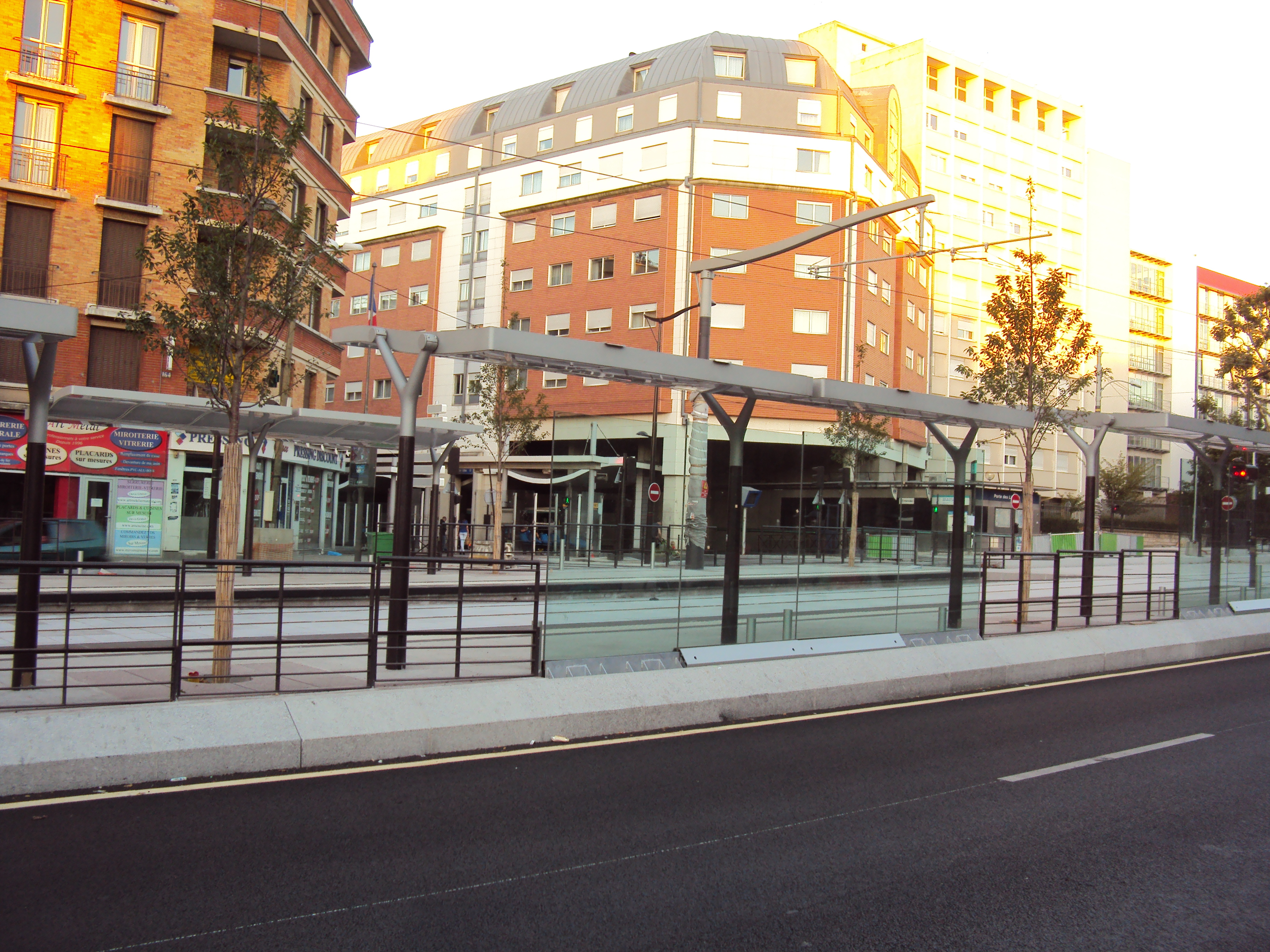
The Porte des Lilas station

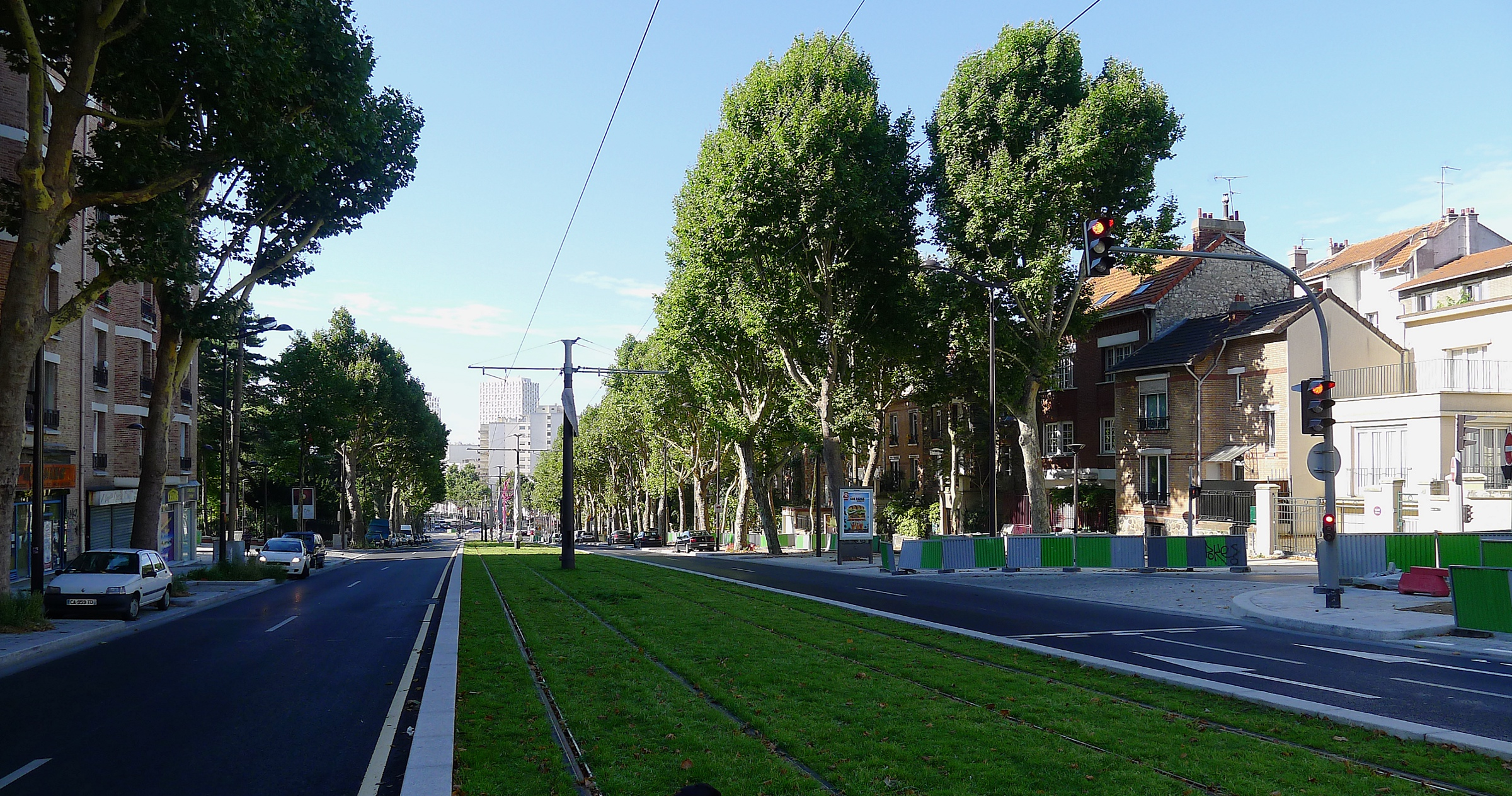
The boulevard heading to Porte de Bagnolet after roadworks for the tramway Line 3a ended in August 2012
