= Lycée Hélène Boucher (Paris) =

Senior high school in Paris, France

Coordinates: 48.8480°N 2.4070°E

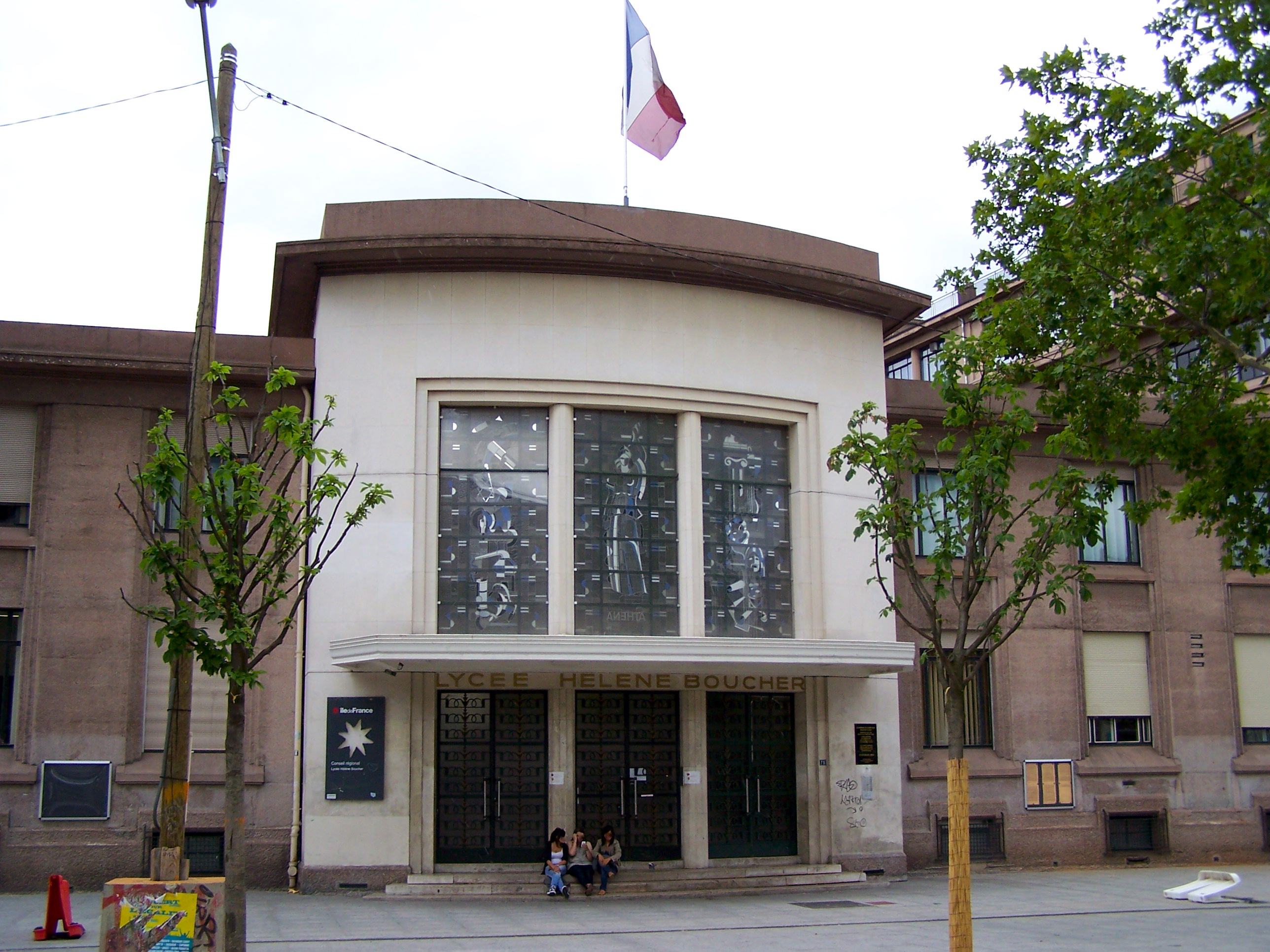
Lycée Hélène Boucher

Lycée et collège Hélène Boucher is a senior high school and junior high school on Cours de Vincennes in the 20th arrondissement of Paris.

Lycée de Jeunes Filles du Cours de Vincennes, a school for girls, was constructed on a site which previously held a gas factory. It was built in 1935 and established by decree on October 3, 1937. It did not close during World War II, and was renamed after Boucher. The enrollment had a significant increase in the 1950s. Enrollment became stable after Lycée Maurice Ravel, which originated from the annexe des Maraîchers, opened. Lycée Boucher was affected by the May 1968 events in France.
