= Boulevard Soult =

Street in Paris, France

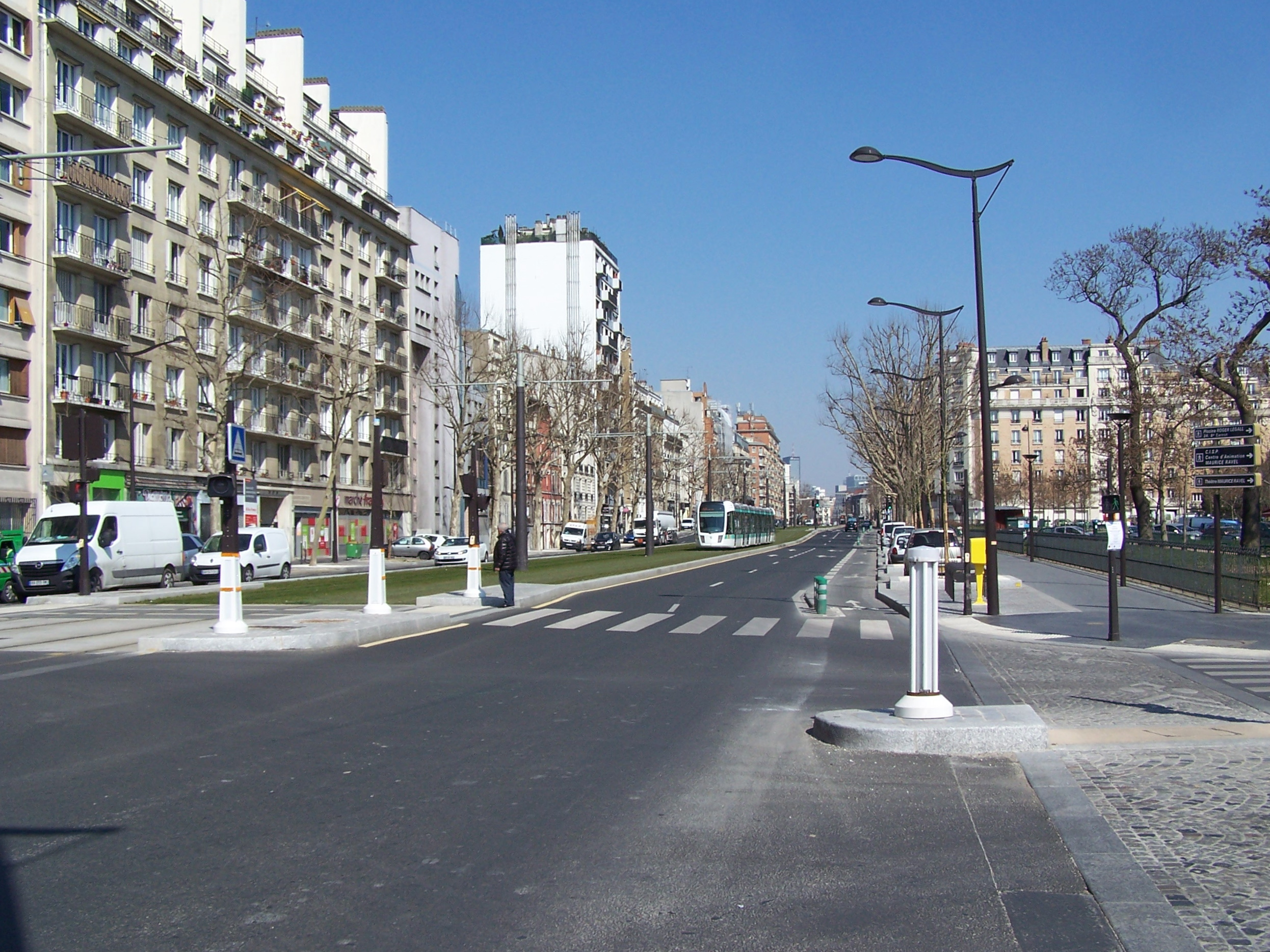
- The Boulevard Soult at the Porte de Montempoivre

- Location within Paris
- Namesake: Jean-de-Dieu Soult
- Length: 1,270 m (4,170 ft)
- Width: 40 m (130 ft) to 43.4 m (142 ft)
- Arrondissement: 12th
- Quarter: Bel-Air
- Coordinates: 48°50′29″N 2°24′34″E
- From: 279, boulevard Poniatowski; Avenue Daumesnil
- To: Boulevard Davout; 116 bis, cours de Vincennes

Construction
- Denomination: March 2, 1864

The Boulevard Soult (French pronunciation: [bulvaʁ sult]) is a boulevard in the Bel-Air neighborhood in the 12th arrondissement of Paris, France. It is one of the Boulevards of the Marshals that run in the outer parts of the city.

== Description ==
The Boulevard Soult runs from the Avenue Daumesnil at the Porte Dorée to the Porte de Vincennes, where it is continued by the Boulevard Davout.

The Boulevard Soult was accessible through the Petite Ceinture bus line. It can now be reached through the tramway Line 3 (Porte de Vincennes, Alexandra David-Néel, Montempoivre, Porte Dorée stations), the Métro Line 1 (Porte Dorée station), as well as RATP bus lines 29, 46, 56, 86 and 351.

== History ==
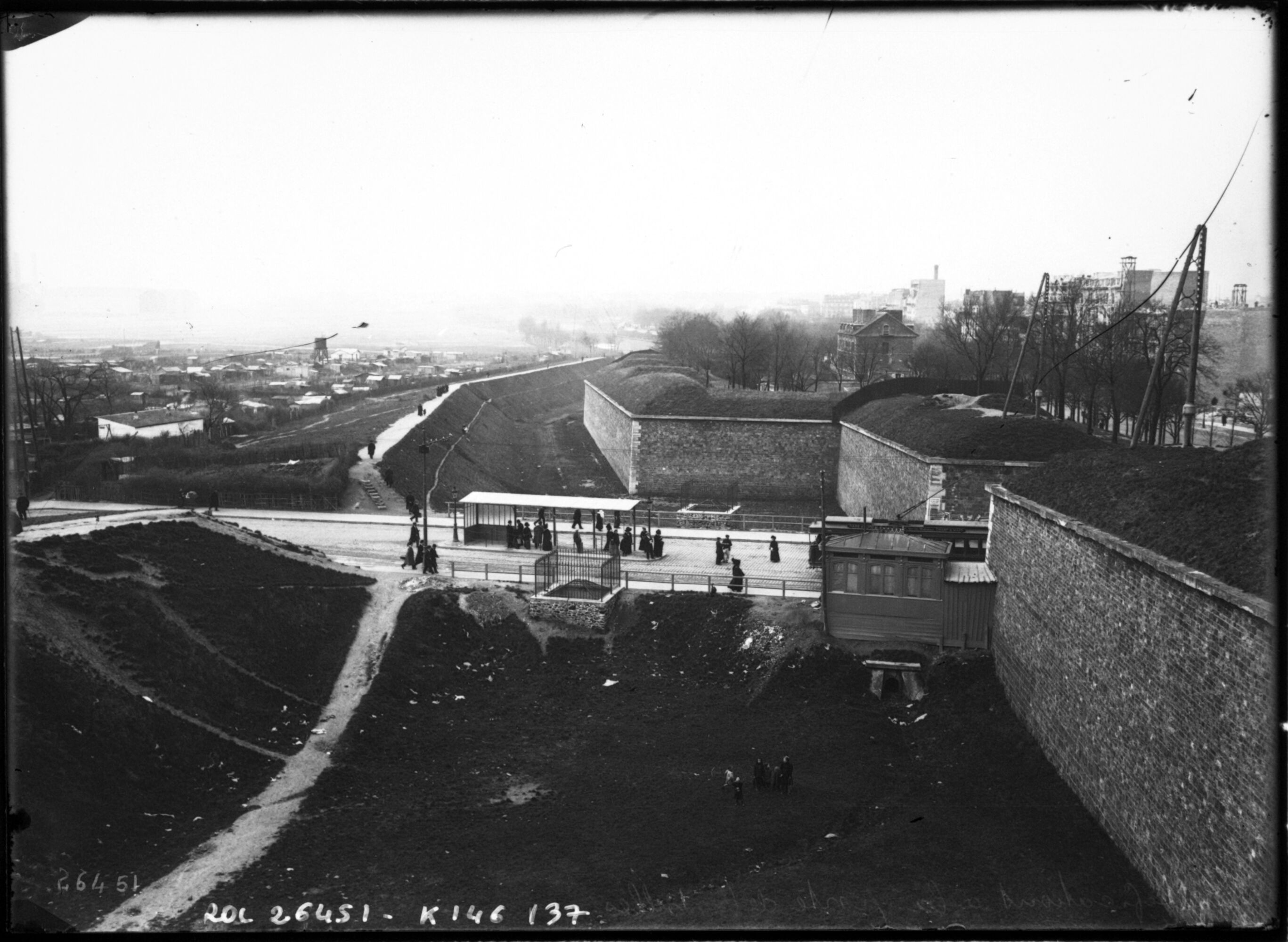
A portion of the Thiers wall, near Porte de Versailles, before it was torn down and replaced by an autoroute.

The French war department had completed the Thiers wall – including fortifications, a dry moat, a Rue Militaire and a large berm – around 1840. In 1859, the military engineering service gave conditional control to the Paris city council. The expansion of the land area of Paris in 1860, by annexing bordering communities, created a situation where everything within the Thiers wall was Paris and everything without was not. The Thiers wall, with its accompanying berm and moat, led to a profound disruption and complication of the synergistic relationship between Paris and its suburbs.

Paris city council started upgrading and conversion of some sections of the Rue Militaire into boulevards in 1861, with the (yet unnamed) Boulevard Soult one of the first stretches to open. In 1864, the boulevard was named after Jean-de-Dieu Soult (1769–1851), 1st Duke of Dalmatia and Marshal of France. Each section was named for a marshal of the First French Empire (1804–1814) who served under Napoleon I, leading to the entire ring being collectively called the Boulevards of the Marshals. The Boulevards of the Marshals concept was almost fully realized by 1932, though the final three sections, closing the ring, would not be completed until 2005. Of the 22 boulevards, 19 have been named for Soult or one of his fellow First Empire marshals.

In the 1930s, HBM-type social housings were built at La Zone to accommodate working-class people that have come through rural flight after WW1. These buildings stretch along a large part of the Boulevard Soult, on the outer side between the Porte Dorée and the Porte de Vincennes.

On September 22, 2008, a fire killed a resident and devastated a building at no. 64 boulevard Soult at the Porte de Saint-Mandé.

Since December 2012, a new section of the tramway Line 3 has been running on the Boulevard Soult.

== Notable buildings and landmarks ==
- At no. 27, there was a 16-meter-high and 2.20-meter-circumferential European nettle tree planted in 1906 and classified as a "remarkable tree". This tree no longer exists.
- In the mid-1960s, the southeastern section of the Boulevard Soult was altered to enable the construction of the lycée Paul Valéry, inaugurated in 1962 at no. 38.
- Square Émile-Cohl and Square Georges-Méliès
- Access to the Promenade plantée at the level of the Rue du Sahel
- No. 101: access to the Sentier des Merisiers, one of the narrowest streets of Paris, that leads to the Rue du Niger
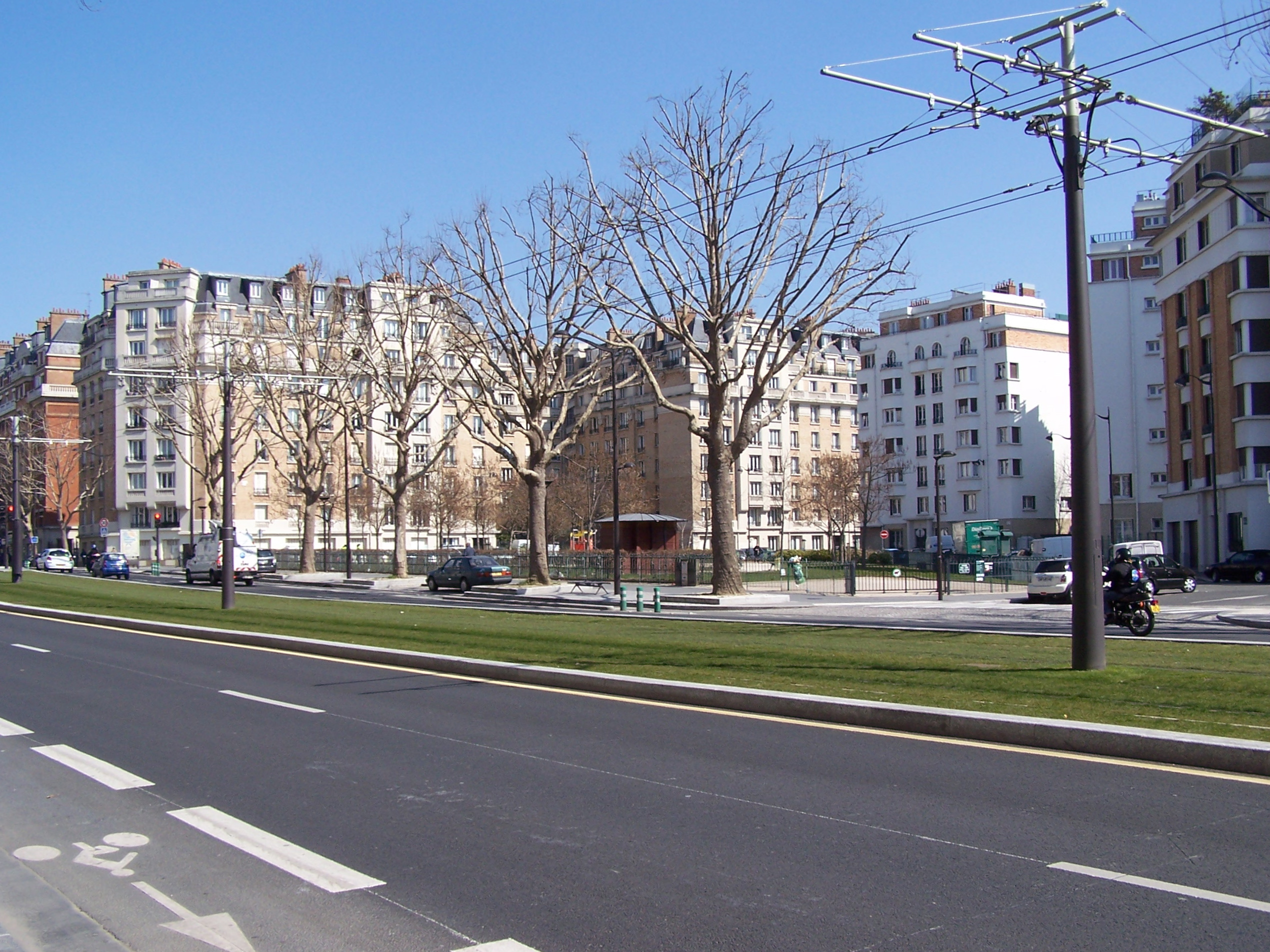
Square Émile-Cohl

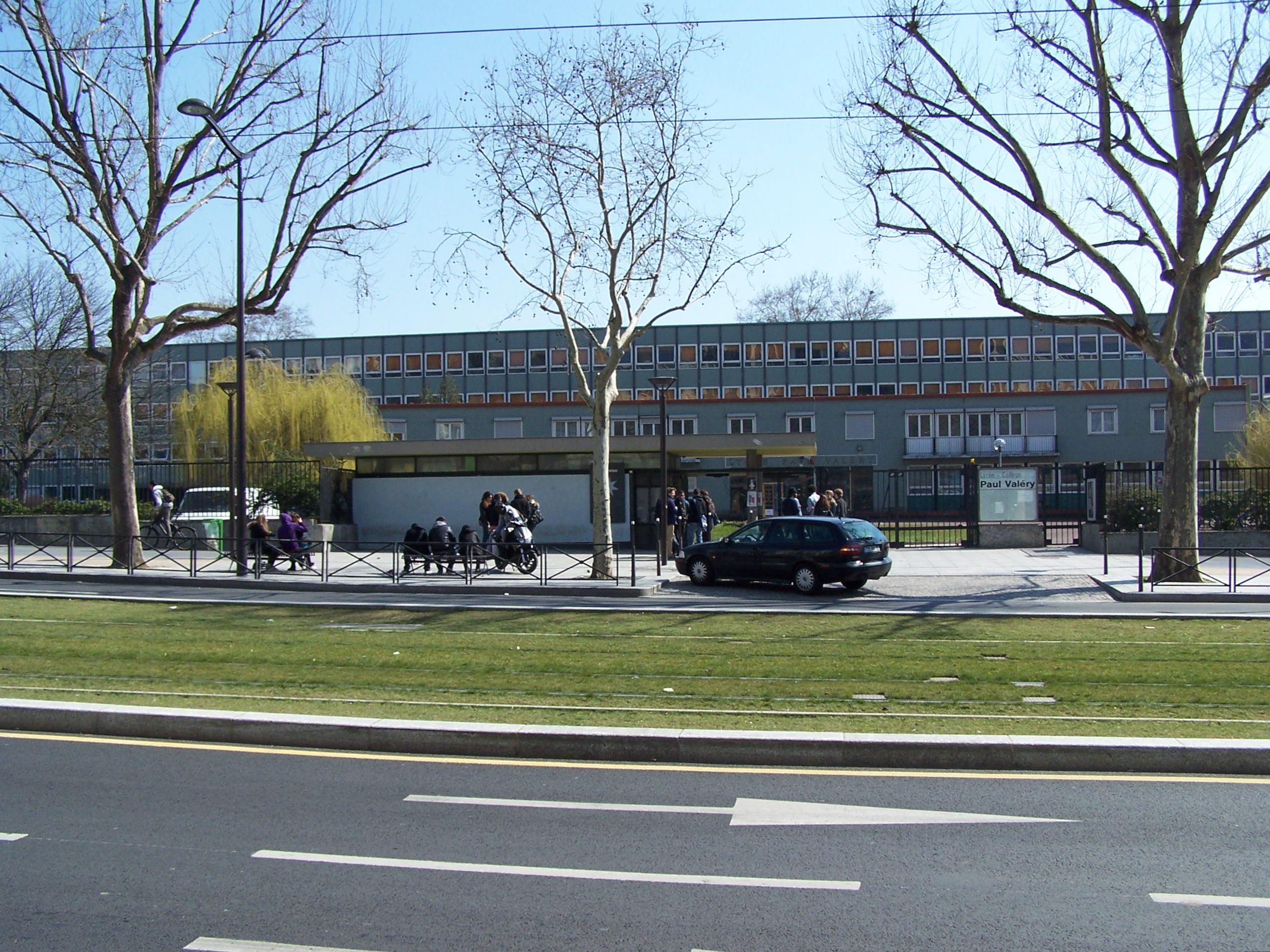
Lycée Paul-Valéry

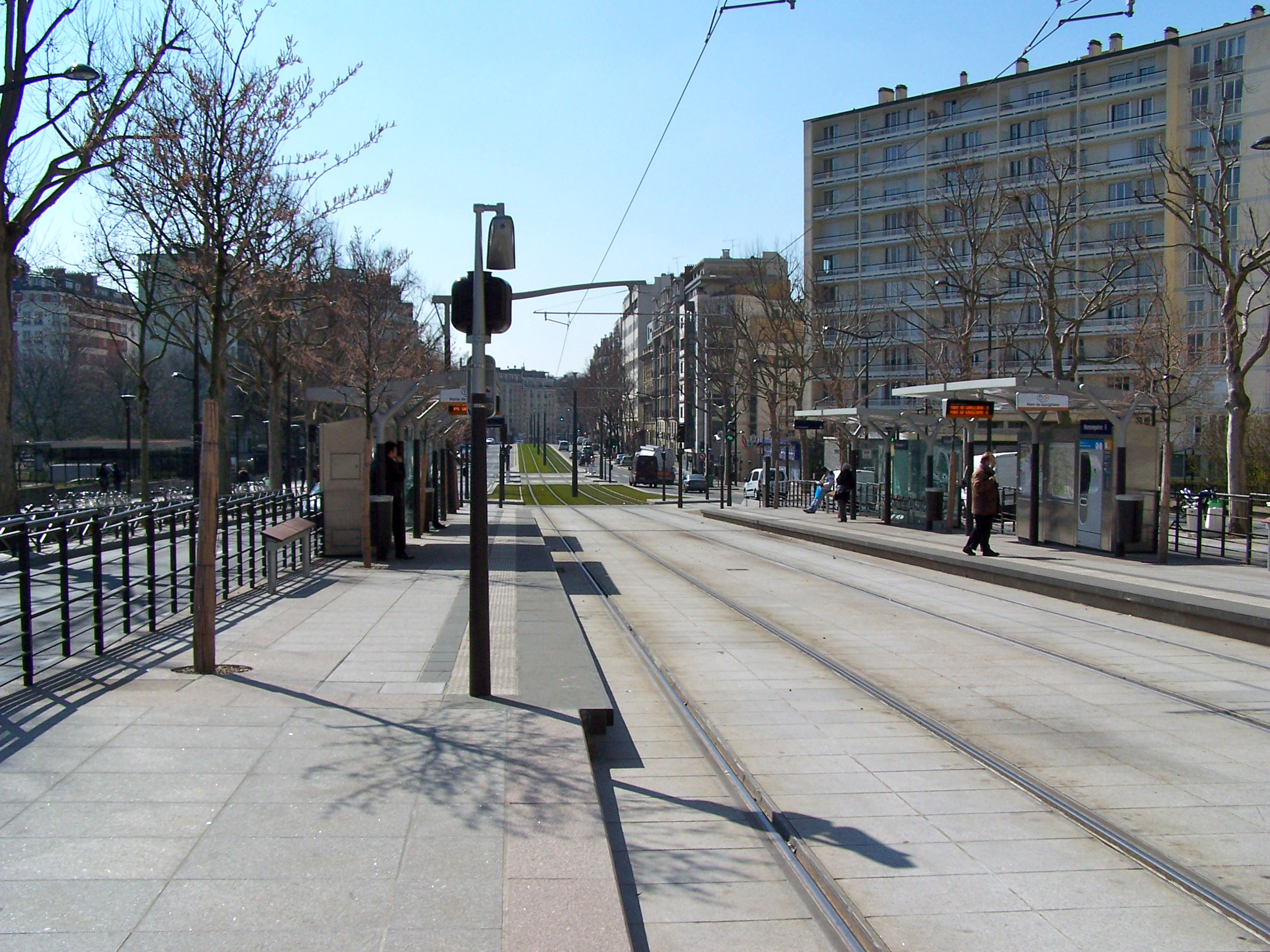
Montempoivre station of tramway Line 3

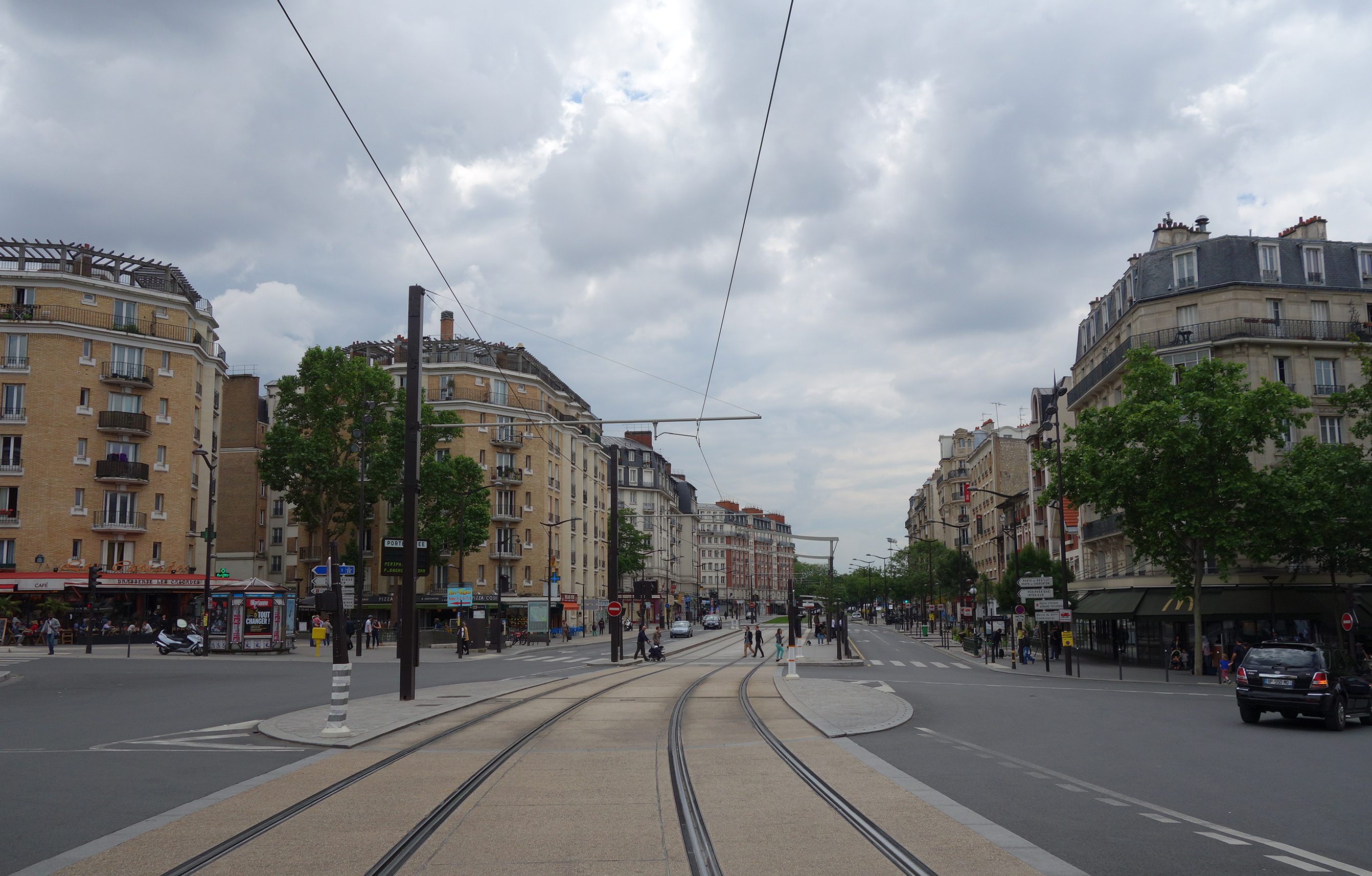
Tramway line

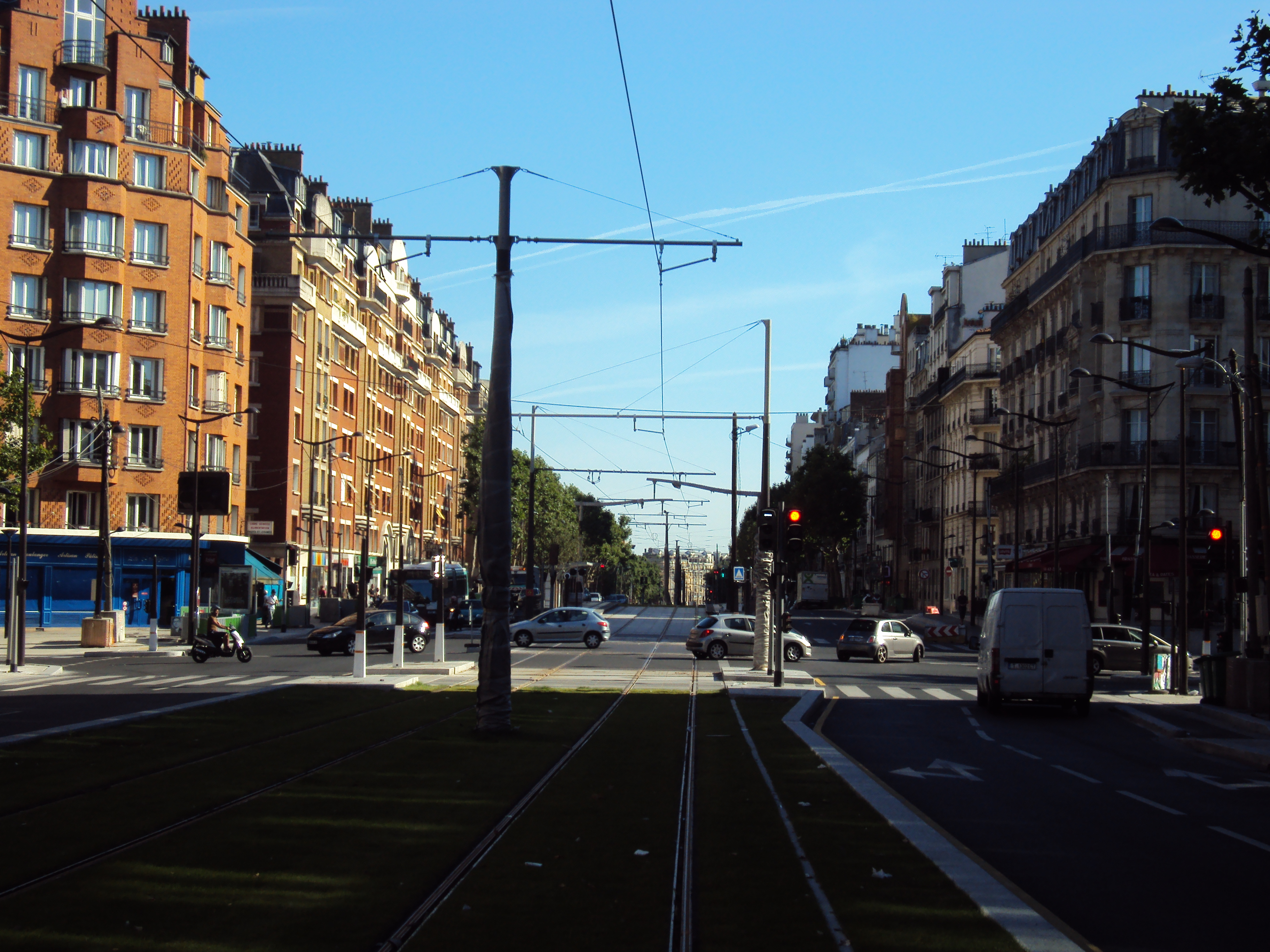
Toward the Porte de Vincennes
