= Franck Balandier =

French writer (1952–2020)

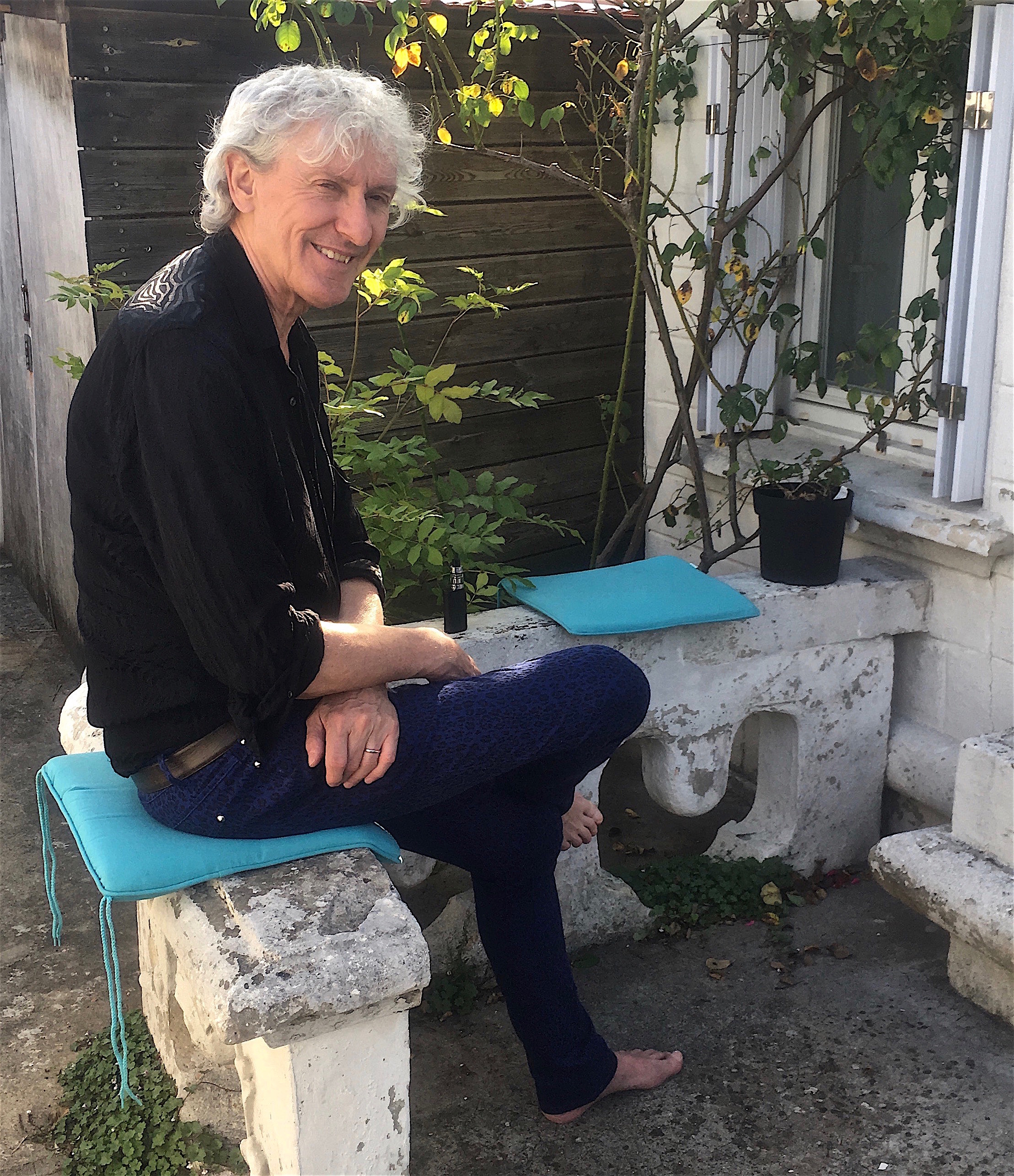
- Balandier in his garden
- Born: 11 July 1952; Suresnes, France
- Died: 17 December 2020 (aged 68); Paris, France
- Occupation: Writer

Franck Balandier (11 July 1952 – 17 December 2020) was a French writer and author. He was a member of the Société des gens de lettres. An author of novels, he also published essays and poetry.

== Biography ==
Balandier was born in Suresnes on 11 July 1952 and grew up in Paris, where he based many of his works. He published his first poem in the journal Première Chance at the age of 14. After a turbulent adolescence, he sought to become an educator, teaching at the Fleury-Mérogis Prison. There, he met fellow educator Patrick Chamoiseau, and the pair discovered affinities for writing. He helped set up the first radio station broadcast from a French prison, called Radio D2. The channel quickly became popular, and featured the likes of Trust, Maxime Le Forestier, Georges Moustaki, Guy Hocquenghem, and others.

Balandier wrote his first novel in 1988. He also worked as a videographer for the Ministry of Justice and created approximately 40 audiovisual documents, including Sidamour, a report on the singer Barbara, who discussed a recital of women at the Fresnes Prison and talked about the issue of HIV/AIDS alongside a professor from the Pasteur Institute. In the years following, he devoted himself to writing and leading writing workshops.

Franck Balandier died on 17 December 2020 in Paris at the age of 68.

== Publications ==
=== Novels ===
- Les Nuits périphériques (1988)
- L’Homme à la voiture rouge (2000)
- Ankylose (2005)
- Le Silence des rails (2014)
- Le Corps parfait des araignées (2017)
- Gazoline Tango (2017)
- APO (2018)

=== Biographies ===
- Les Prisons d’Apollinaire (2001)
- Des poètes derrière les barreaux (2012)
- Le Paris d'Apollinaire (2018)

=== Poetry ===
- Les Hommes sans épaules
- L'Heure tiède (2019)

=== News ===
- Clito, Osez vingt histoires de sexe au soleil (2019)
