= Cours de Vincennes =

Coordinates: 48.8473°N 2.4048°E

The Cours de Vincennes (formerly the Avenue de Vincennes) is a street in Paris, linking the Place de la Nation to the Porte de Vincennes. It forms a major artery and serves as the border between the city's 12th and 20th arrondissements. It was built before 1860 and forms the start of Route nationale 34.

== Junctions ==
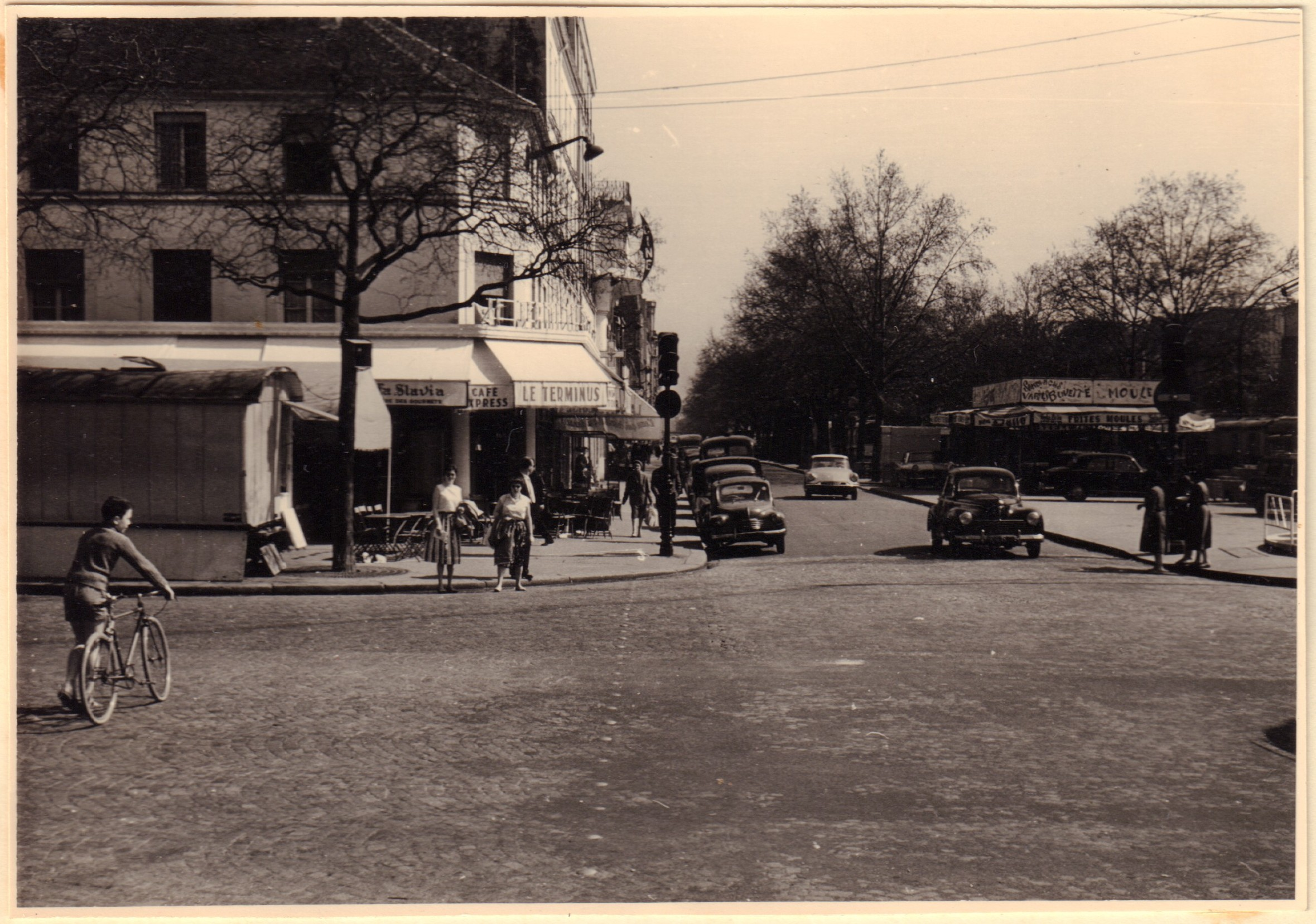
The Cours de Vincennes, 1959

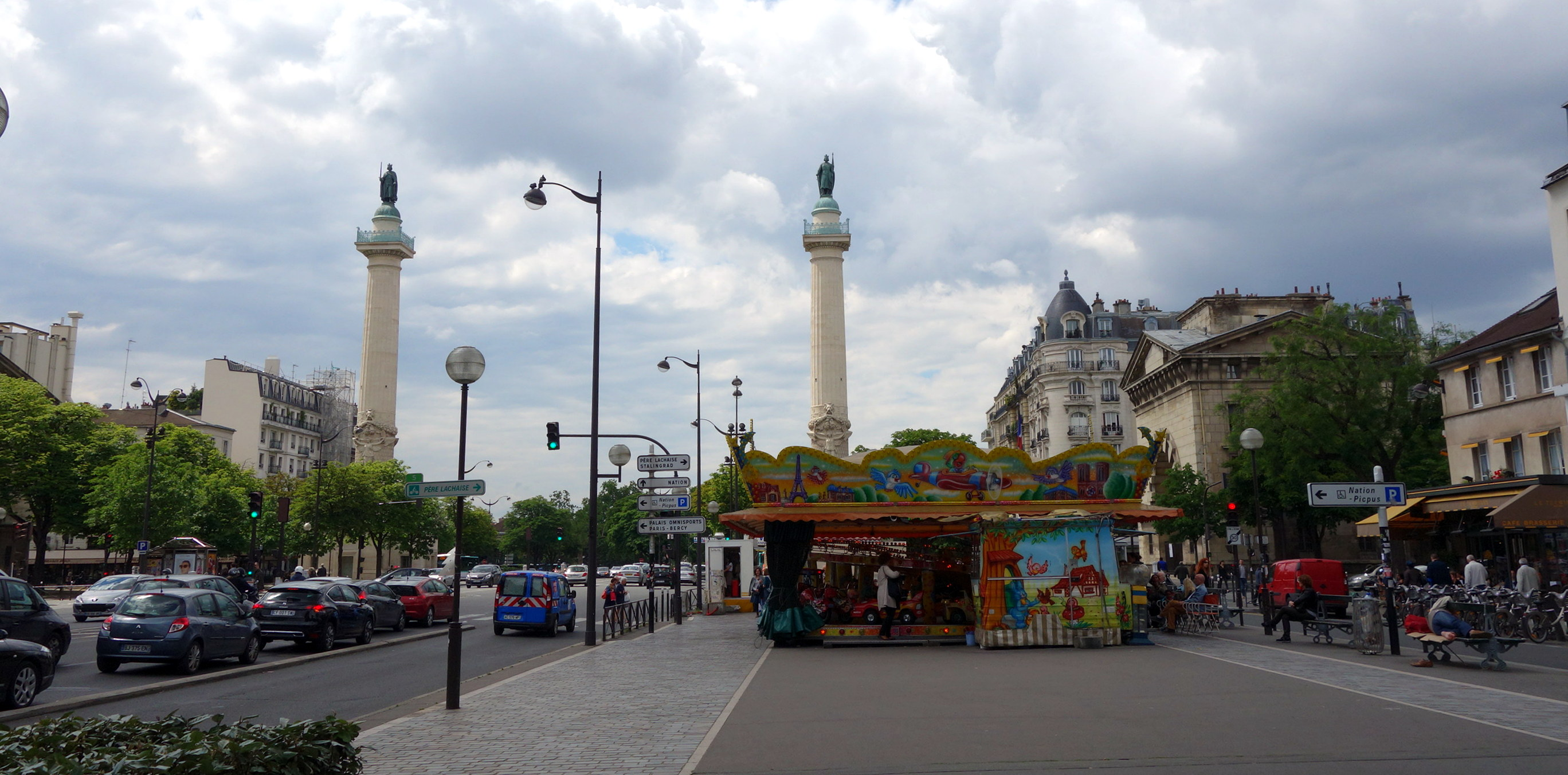
The Cours de Vincennes, 2014

On its south side it has junctions with:

- Boulevard de Picpus
- Rue Marsoulan, formerly the Rue Ruty, renamed 1912
- Avenue du Docteur-Arnold-Netter, part of the Avenue du Général-Michel-Bizot until 1962
- Passage de la Voûte
- Boulevard Soult

On its north side it has junctions with:

- Boulevard de Charonne
- Rue Lucien-et-Sacha-Guitry, known as the Rue Lucien-Guitry until 1969
- Rue Félix-Huguenet
- Rue des Pyrénées
- Rue des Maraîchers
- Rue du Général-Niessel
- Boulevard Davout
