= 15th arrondissement of Paris =

Municipal arrondissement in France

- Municipal arrondissement
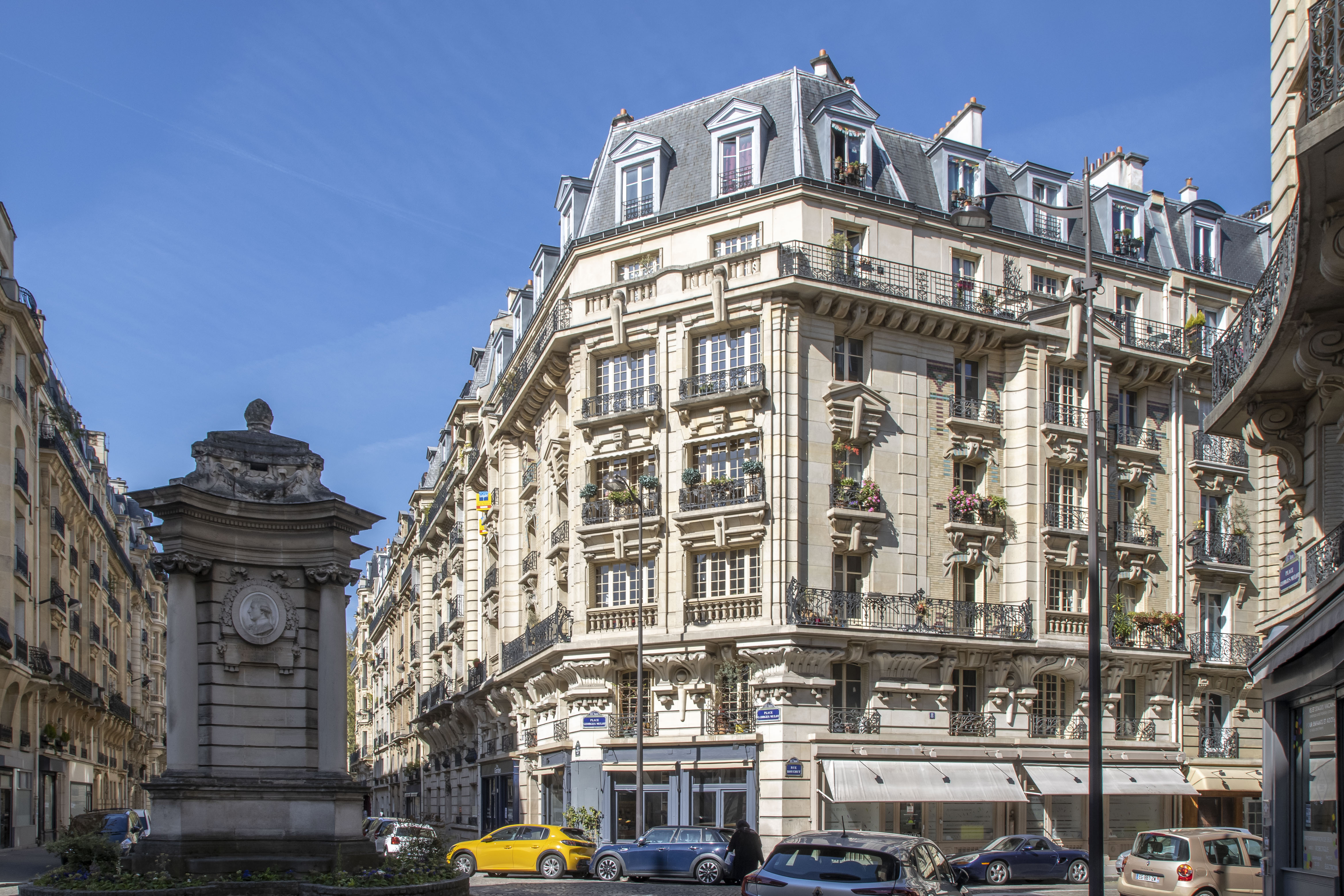
- Place Georges-Mulot with the Fontaine du Puits de Grenelle at its centre

- Coat of arms

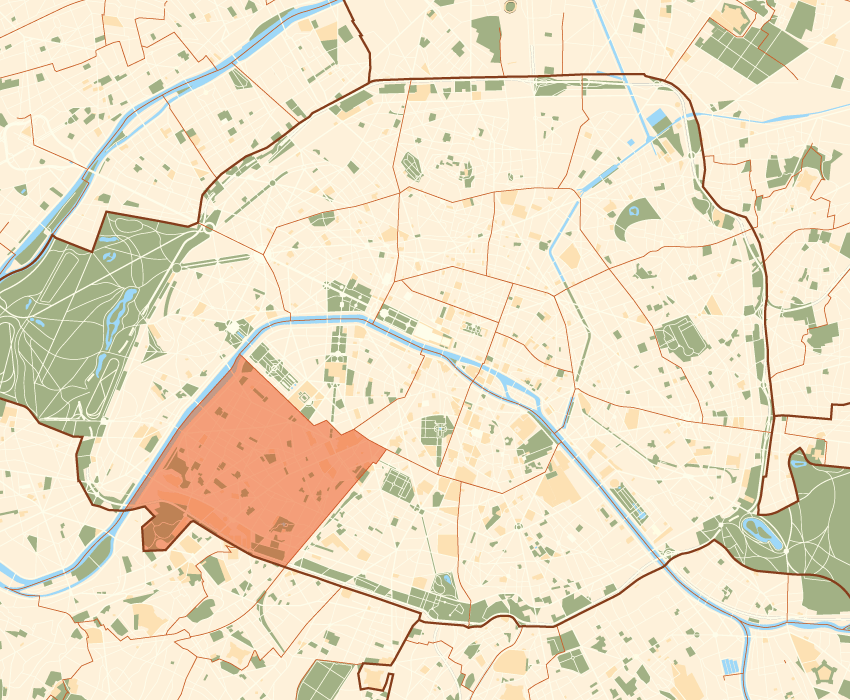
- Location within Paris
- Coordinates: 48°50′29″N 2°18′01″E
- Country: France
- Region: Île-de-France
- Department: Paris
- Commune: Paris

Government
  - Mayor (2020–2026): Philippe Goujon (LR)
- Area: 8.50 km^{2} (3.28 sq mi)
- Population (2023): 229,713
  - Density: 27,000/km^{2} (70,000/sq mi)
- INSEE code: 75115

The 15th arrondissement of Paris (French: XV^{e} arrondissement) is one of the 20 arrondissements of the capital city of France. In spoken French, it is referred to as le quinzième (pronounced [lə kɛ̃zjɛm], 'the fifteenth').

The 15th arrondissement, called Vaugirard, is situated on the left bank of the River Seine. Sharing the Montparnasse district with the 6th and 14th arrondissements, it is the city's most populous arrondissement, with a population of 229,713 as of 2023. Tour Montparnasse – the tallest skyscraper in Paris – and the neighbouring Gare Montparnasse are both located in the 15th arrondissement, at its border with the 14th.

It is also home to the high-rise Beaugrenelle district and the Front de Seine riverside development, as well as the Paris Expo Porte de Versailles convention centre, where the 180-metre Tour Triangle is set to house a 120-room hotel and 70,000 square metres (750,000 sq ft) of office space in 2026. Close is the Héliport de Paris, the city heliport, just nearby the border with Issy-les-Moulineaux.

== History ==
The loi du 16 juin 1859 decreed the annexation to Paris of the area between the old Wall of the Ferme générale and the Wall of Thiers. The communes of Grenelle, Vaugirard and Javel were incorporated into Paris in 1860.

Politician Charles Michels (born 1903) was elected a deputy for the 15th arrondissement under the Popular Front; he was taken hostage and shot by the Nazis in 1941. A Métro station and street now bear his name.

== Quarters ==
As in all the Parisian arrondissements, the fifteenth is made up of four administrative quarters (quartiers).

The four administrative quarters of the 15th arrondissement

- To the south, quartier Saint-Lambert occupies the former site of the village of Vaugirard, built along an ancient Roman road. The geography of the area was particularly suited to wine-making, as well as quarrying. In fact, many Parisian monuments, such as the École Militaire, were built from Vaugirard stone. The village, not yet being part of Paris, was considered by Parisians to be an agreeable suburb, pleasant for country walks or its cabarets and puppet shows. In 1860 Vaugirard was annexed to Paris, along with adjoining villages. Today, notable attractions in this area include the Parc des Expositions (an exhibition centre which hosts the Foire de Paris, agricultural expositions, in addition to car shows) and Parc Georges-Brassens, a park built on the former site of a slaughterhouse where every year wine by the name of Clos des Morillons is produced and auctioned at the civic centre.
- To the east, quartier Necker was originally an uninhabited space between Paris and Vaugirard. The most well-known landmarks in the area are the Gare Montparnasse train station and the looming Tour Montparnasse office tower. The area around the train station has been renovated and now contains a number of office and apartment blocks, a park (the Jardin Atlantique, built directly over the train tracks), and a shopping centre. Finally, the quartier contains a number of public buildings: the Lycée Buffon, the Necker Children's Hospital, as well as the private foundation Pasteur Institute.
- To the north, quartier Grenelle was originally a village of the same name. Grenelle plain extended from the current Hôtel des Invalides to the suburb of Issy-les-Moulineaux on the other side of the Seine, but remained mostly uninhabited in centuries past due to difficulties farming the land. At the beginning of the 19th century, an entrepreneur by the name of Violet divided off a section of the plain: this became the village of Beaugrenelle, known for its series of straight streets and blocks, which remain today. The whole area broke off from the commune of Vaugirard in 1830, becoming the commune of Grenelle, which was in turn annexed to Paris in 1860. A century later, a number of apartment and office towers were built along the Seine, the Front de Seine along with the Beaugrenelle shopping mall.
- To the west, quartier Javel lies to the south of Grenelle plain. In years past, it was the industrial area of the arrondissement: first with chemical companies (the famous Eau de Javel bleach was invented and produced there), then electrical companies (Thomson), and finally car manufacturers (Citroën), whose factories occupied a large part of the quartier up until the early 1970s. The industrial areas have since been rehabilitated; the neighbourhood now contains Parc André-Citroën, Georges Pompidou European Hospital, and a number of large office buildings and television studios (Sagem, Snecma, the Direction Générale de l'Aviation Civile, StudioCanal, France Télévisions, etc.). In addition, to the south of the circular highway (boulevard périphérique), an extension of the 15th, formerly an aerodrome at the beginning of the 20th century, is now a heliport, a gym and a recreation centre.

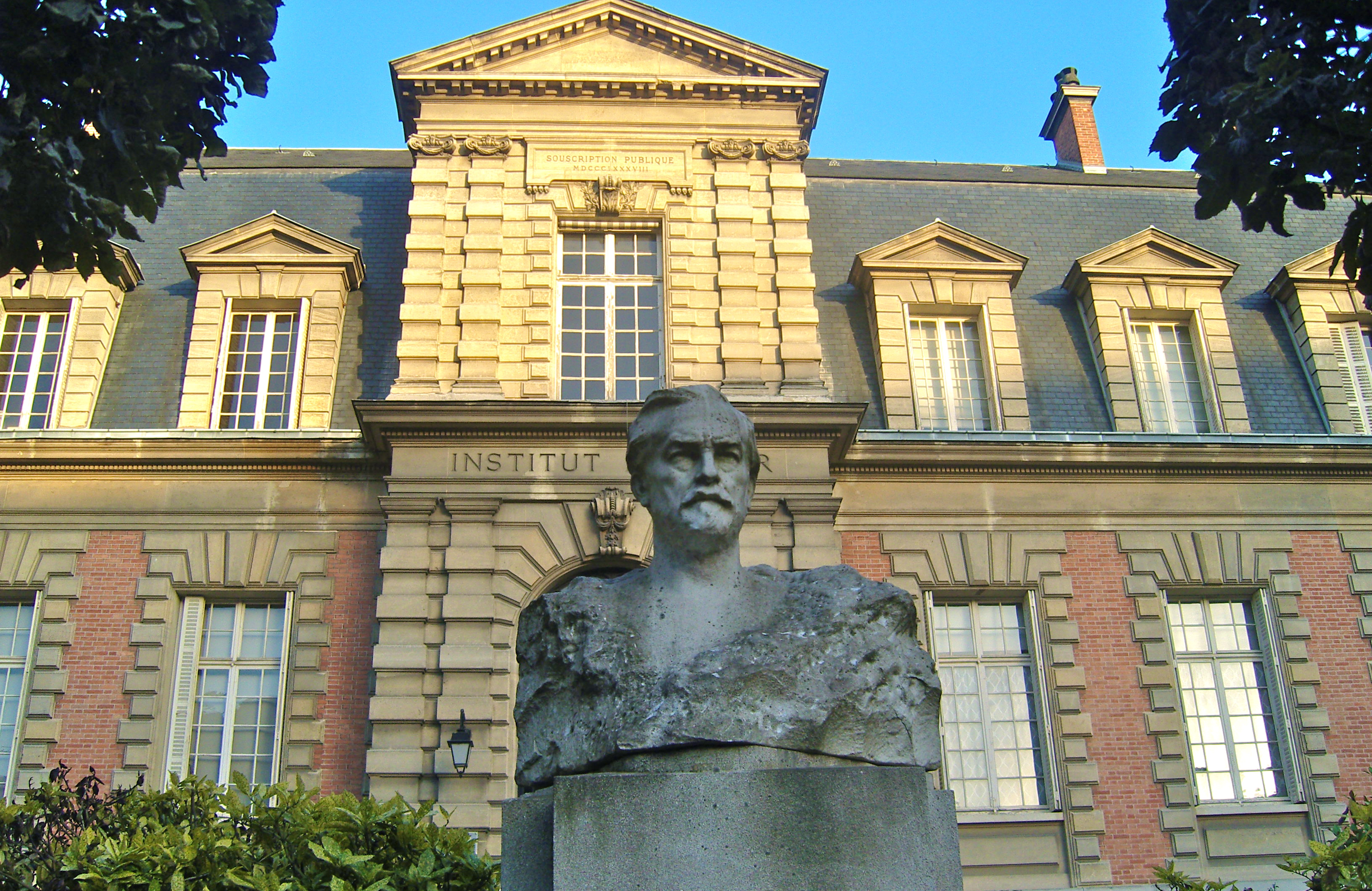
Musée Pasteur

The early airfield here has been encroached upon by urban development and a sports centre, but the residual area, mainly laid to grass, continues to serve Paris as a heliport. The Sécurité Civile has a detachment there close to maintenance facilities. Customs facilities are available and especially busy during the Salon d'Aeronautique airshows held at Le Bourget on the other side of the city.

== Geography ==
The quarters of the 15th arrondissement

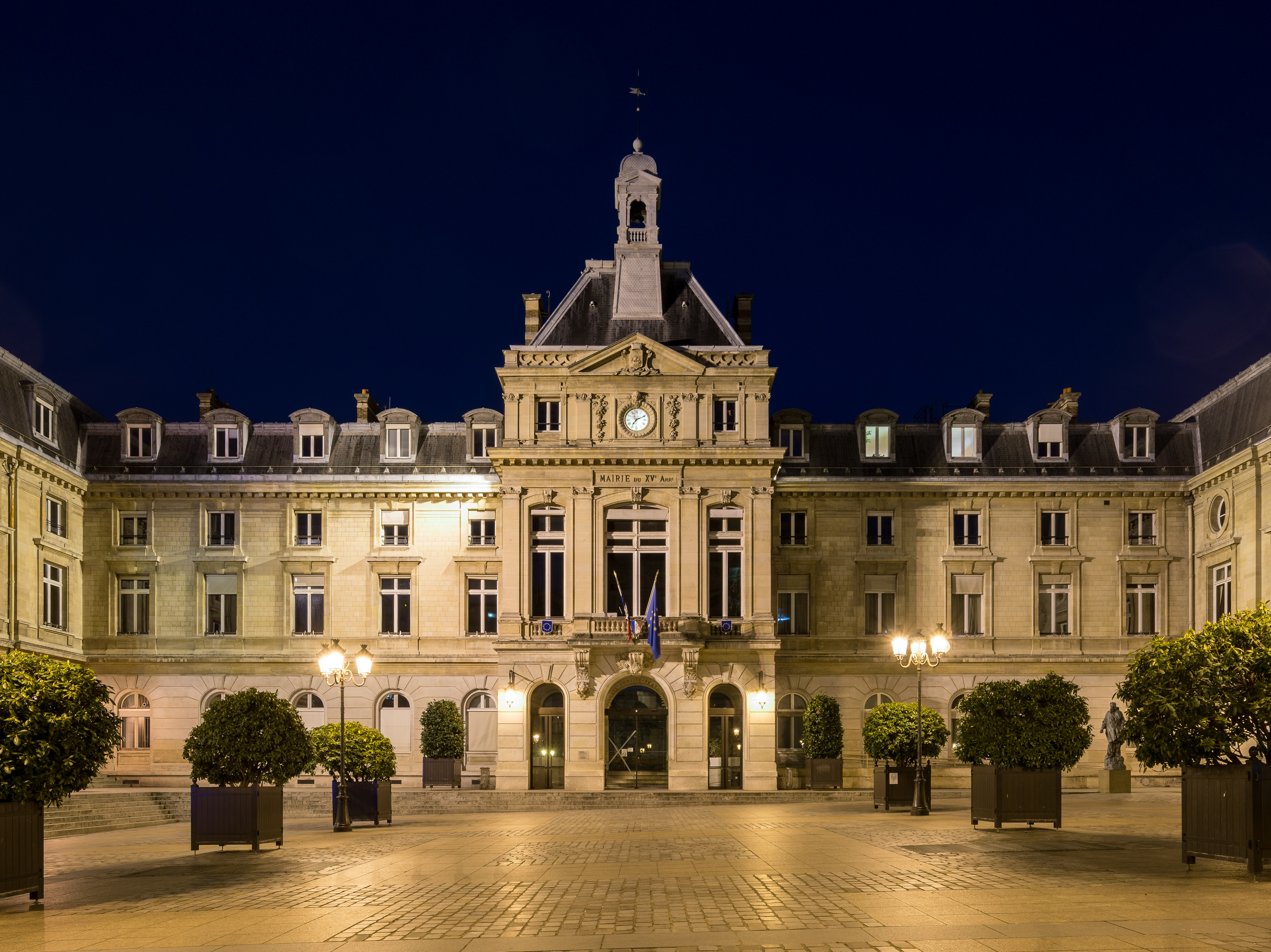
Mairie du XV^{e} arrondissement near Vaugirard Métro station

The 15th arrondissement is located in the southwestern part of Paris, on the left bank of the Seine. It includes one of the three islands in Paris, the Île aux Cygnes ('Isle of Swans'), on the border with the 16th arrondissement. It also borders the 6th, 7th and 14th arrondissements.

At 8.5 km^{2} (3.3 sq mi), it is the third-largest arrondissement in Paris; it would be the largest if the large parks Bois de Boulogne and Bois de Vincennes were not counted as part of the 16th and 12th arrondissements, respectively.

The arrondissement consists of four quarters:

- Quartier Saint-Lambert (57)
- Quartier Necker (58)
- Quartier Grenelle (59)
- Quartier Javel (60)
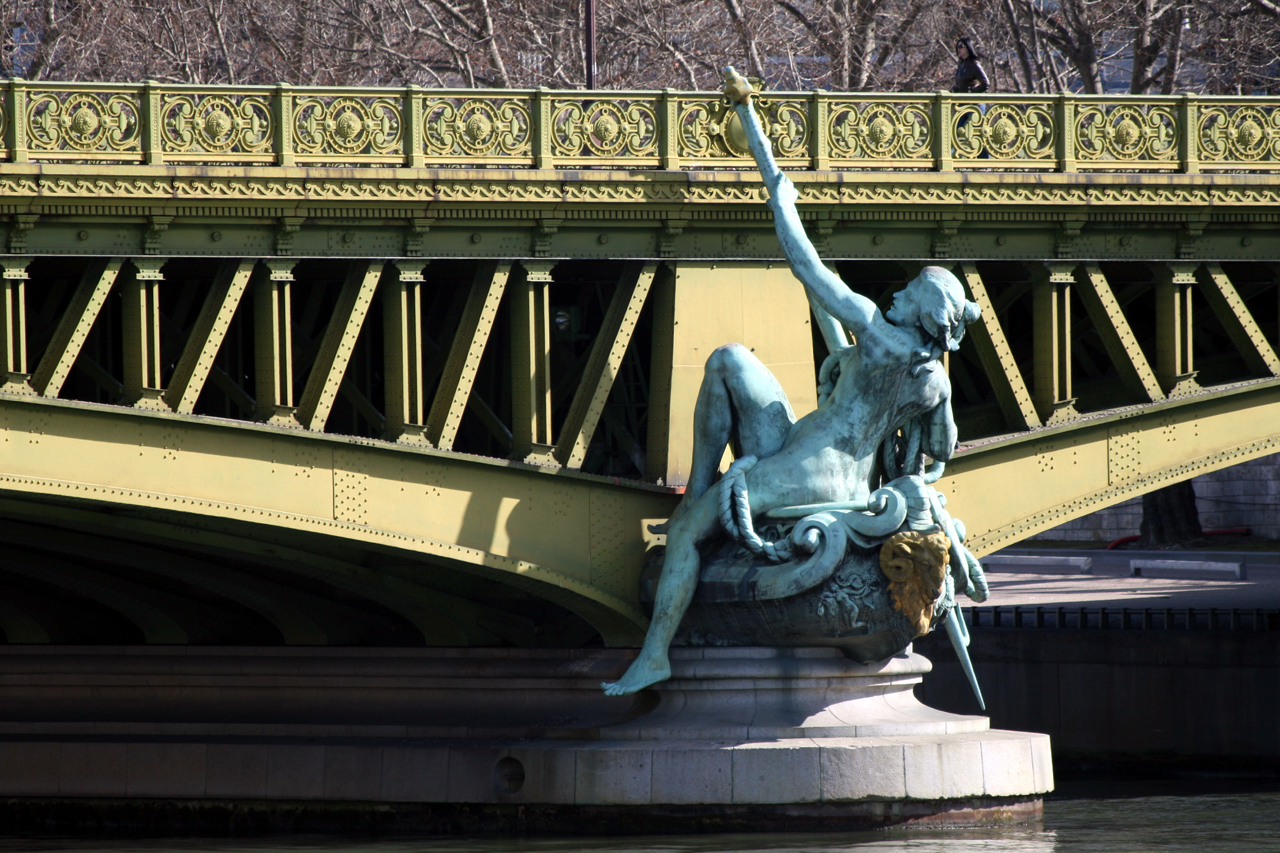
Paris – Pont Mirabeau detail

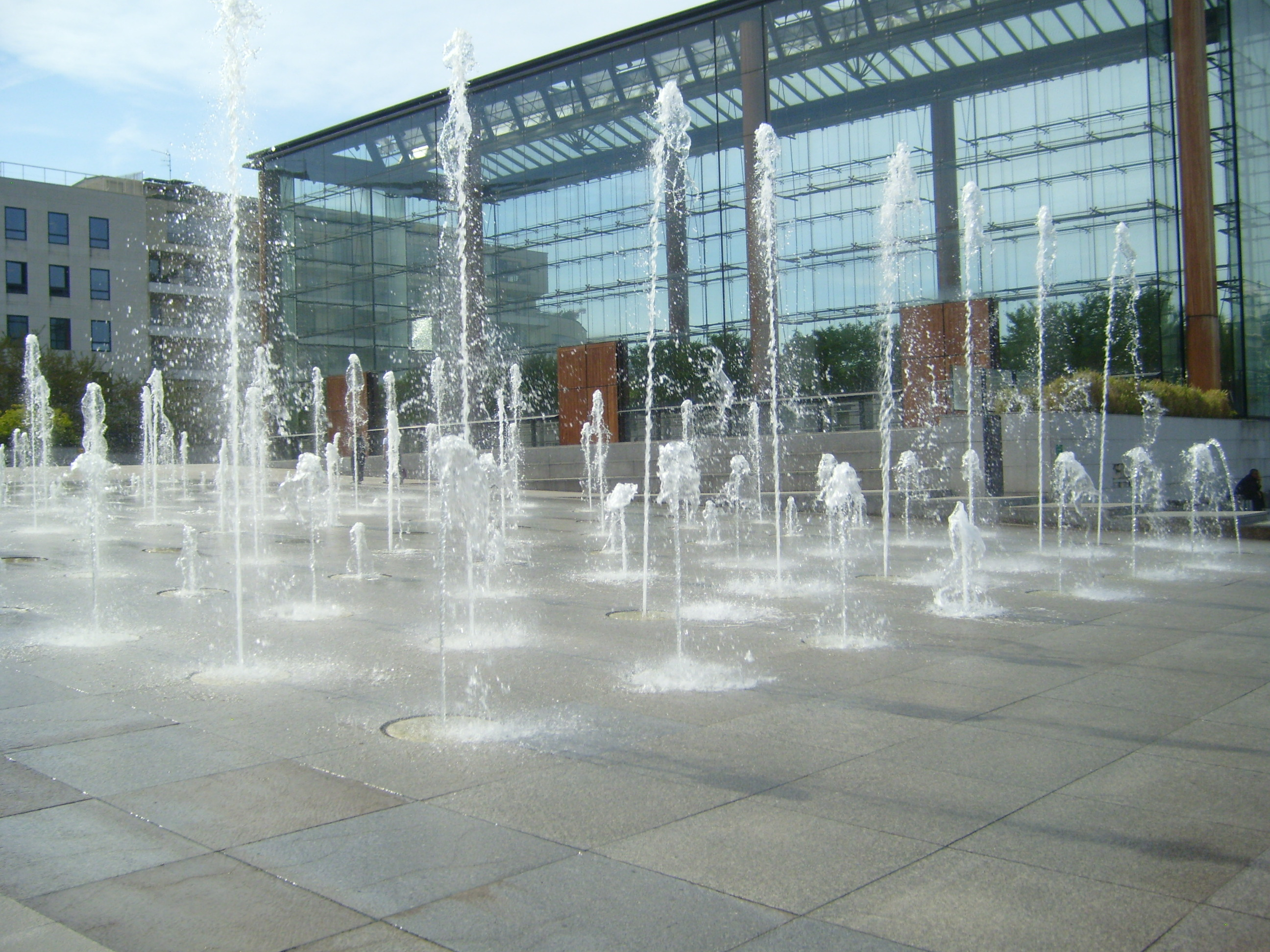
Colonnes d'eau, Parc André-Citroën

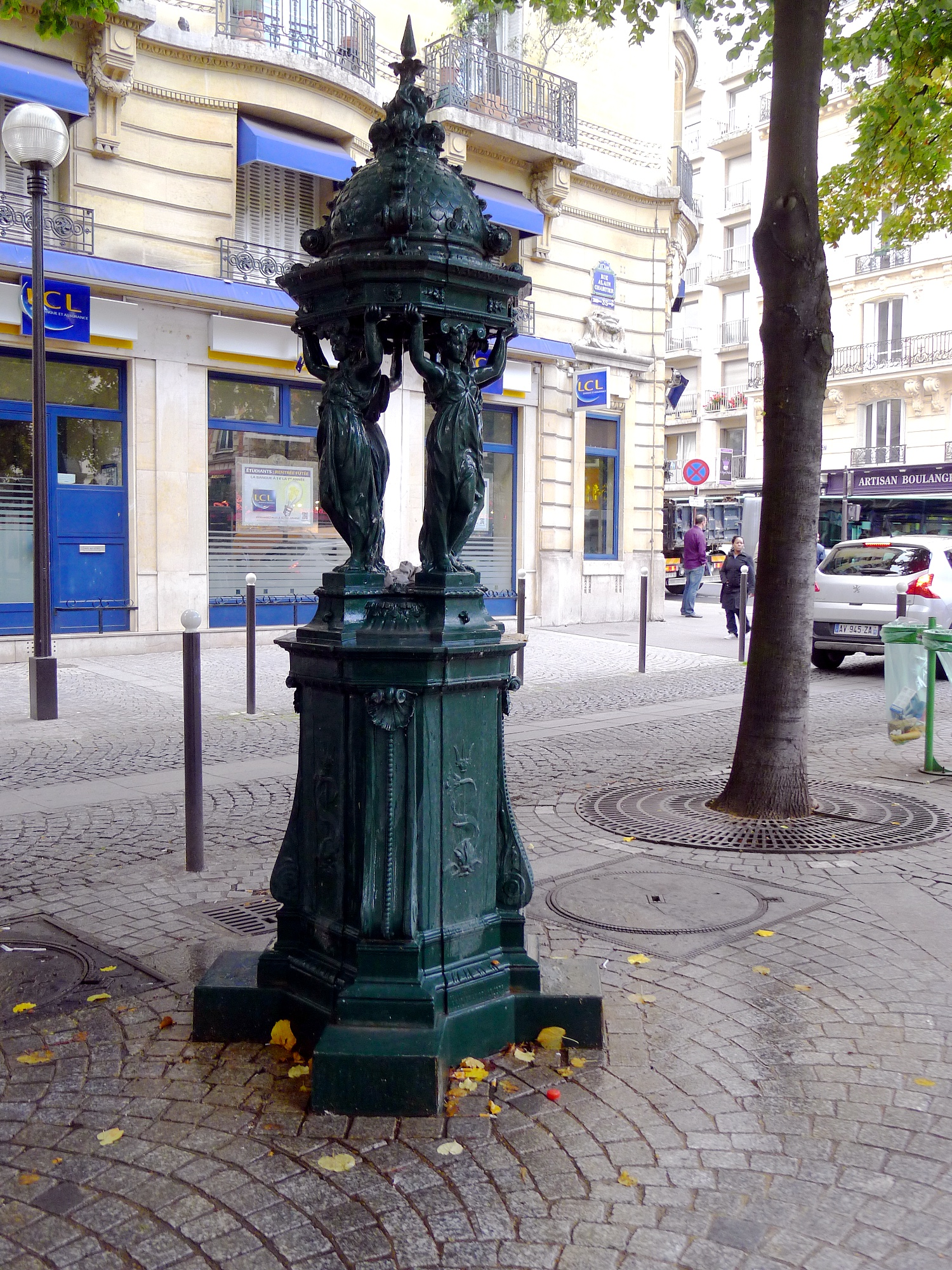
Paris XV, Rue Alain Chartier, Wallace fountain

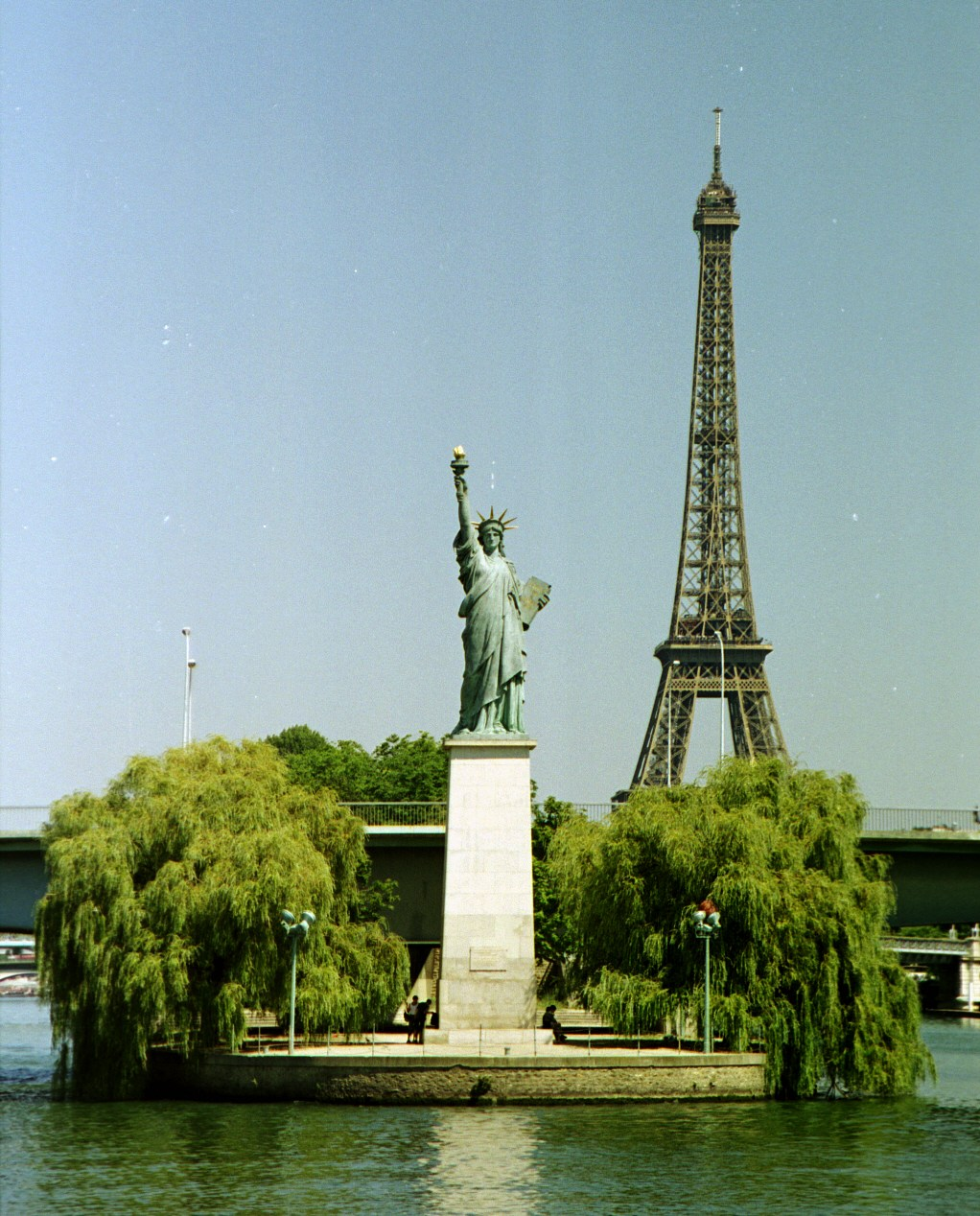
Statue of Liberty (with the Eiffel Tower in background)

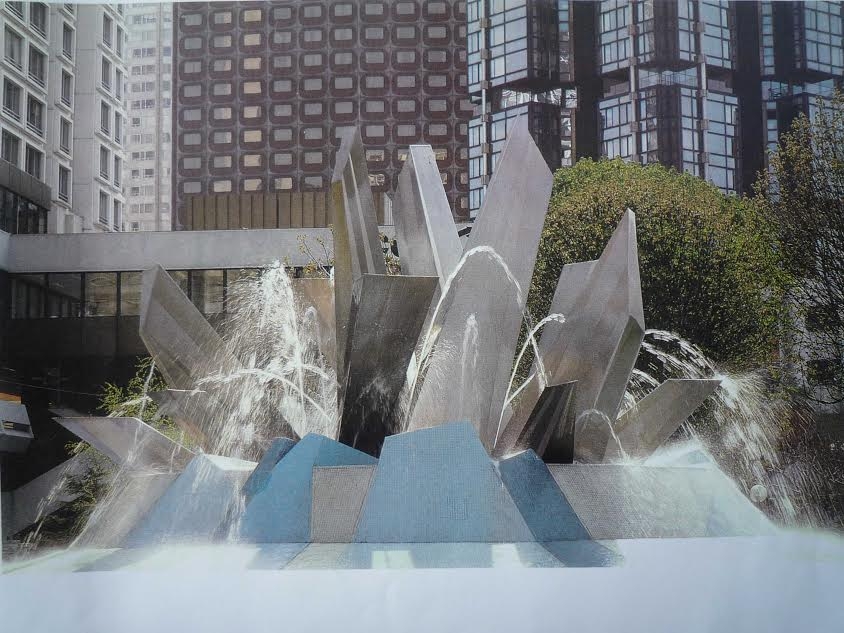
Cristaux. Jean-Yves Lechevallier

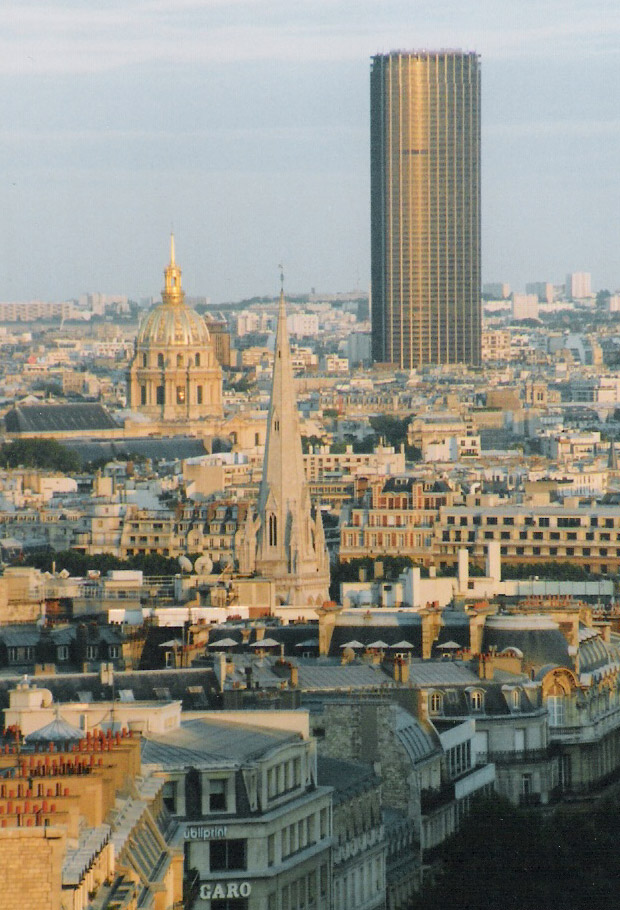
Tour Montparnasse

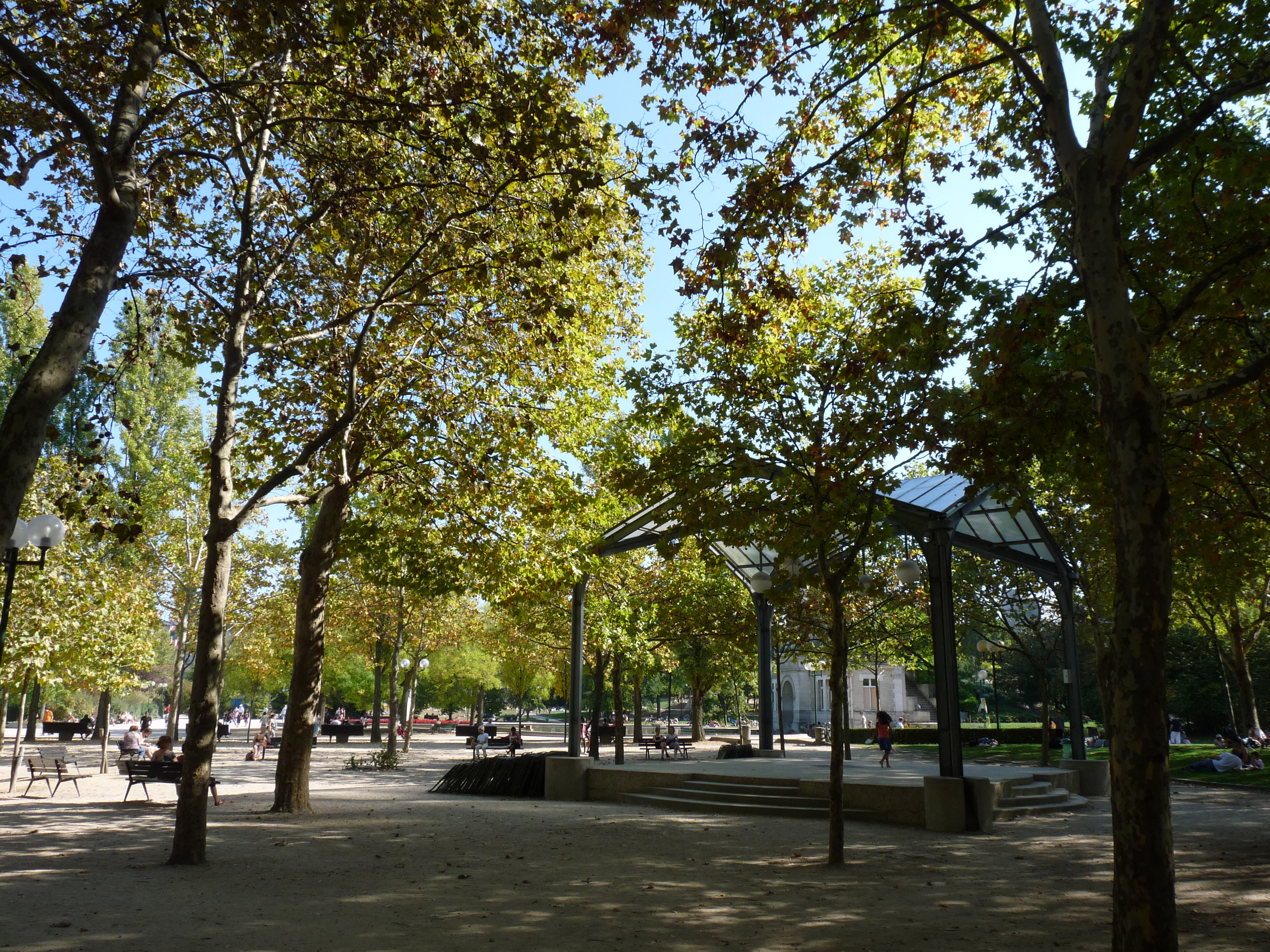
Parc Georges-Brassens

== Demographics ==
=== Historical population ===
Historical population

Year	Pop.	±% p.a.
1861	56,041	—
1872	75,449	+2.74%
1881	102,187	+3.43%
1891	119,307	+1.56%
1901	153,185	+2.53%
1911	199,010	+2.65%
1921	225,331	+1.25%
1931	238,797	+0.58%
1936	243,687	+0.41%
1946	244,981	+0.05%
1954	250,124	+0.26%

Year	Pop.	±% p.a.
1962	250,551	+0.02%
1968	244,080	−0.44%
1975	231,301	−0.77%
1982	225,596	−0.36%
1990	223,940	−0.09%
1999	225,362	+0.07%
2007	232,247	+0.38%
2012	238,190	+0.51%
2017	233,392	−0.41%
2023	229,713	−0.26%

Source: Demographia (1861-1999) and INSEE (1876-2023)

== Places of interest ==
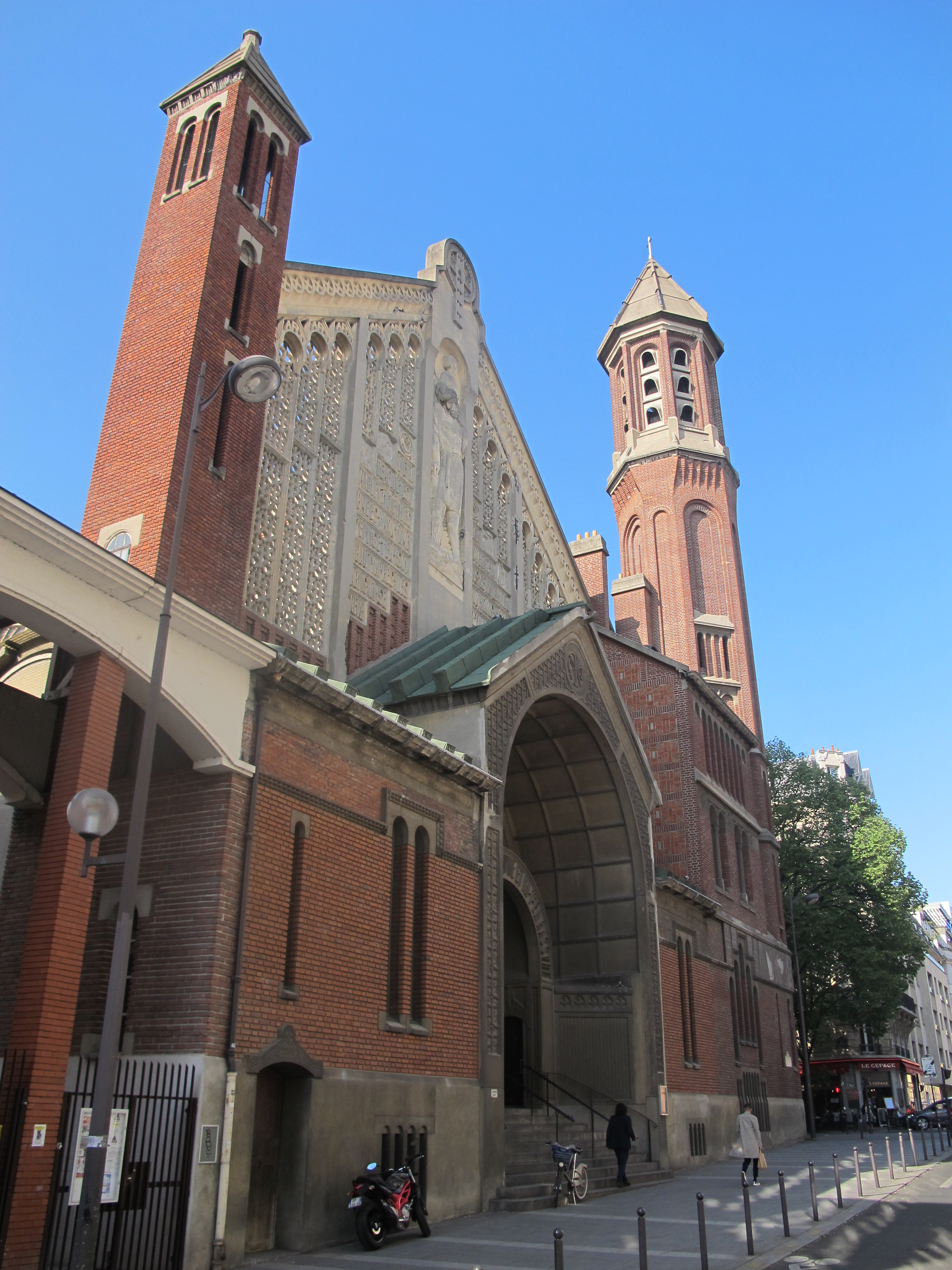
Saint-Christophe-de-Javel, Paris

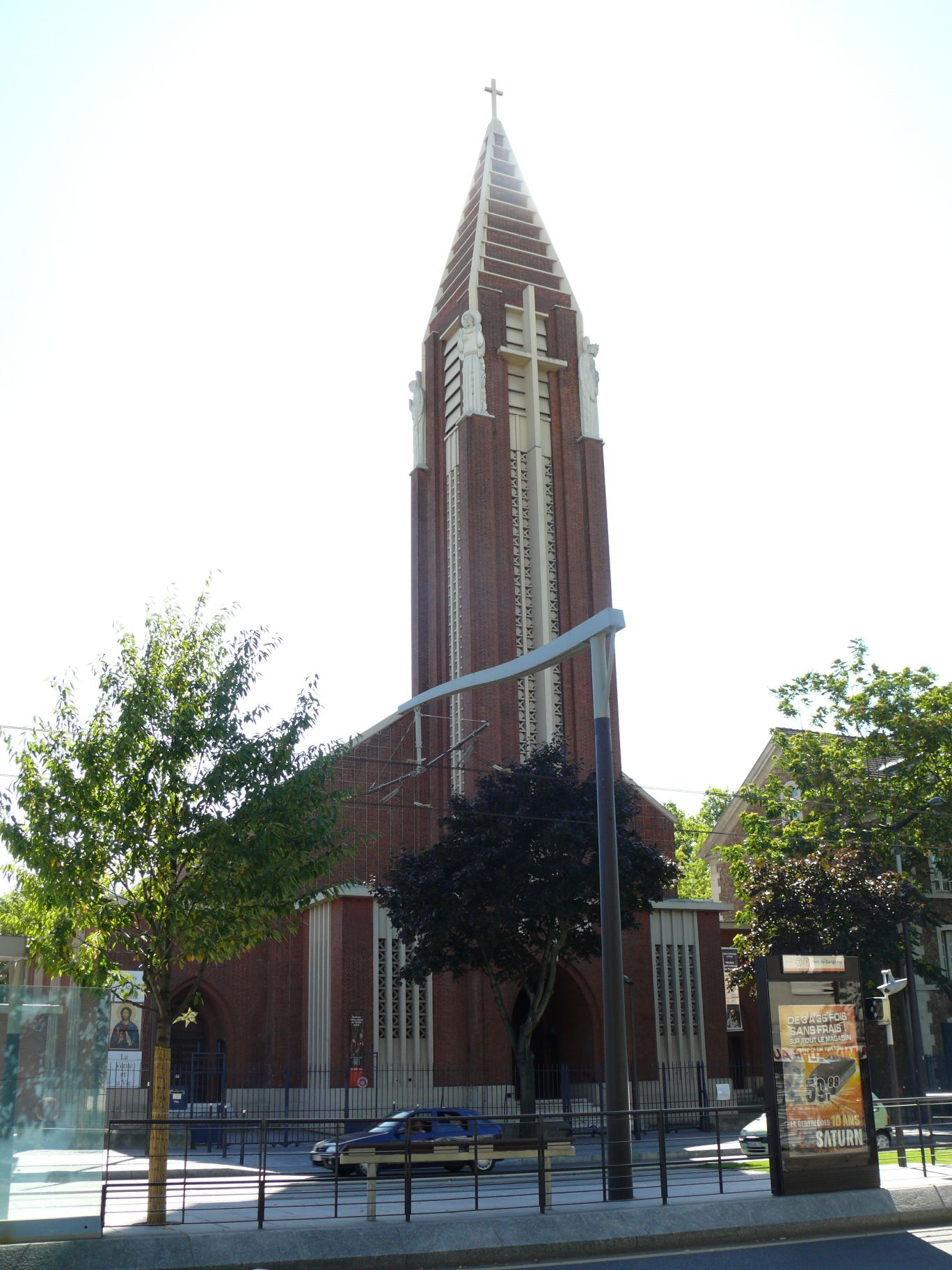
Saint-Antoine-de-Padoue Church, Paris (Art Deco church)

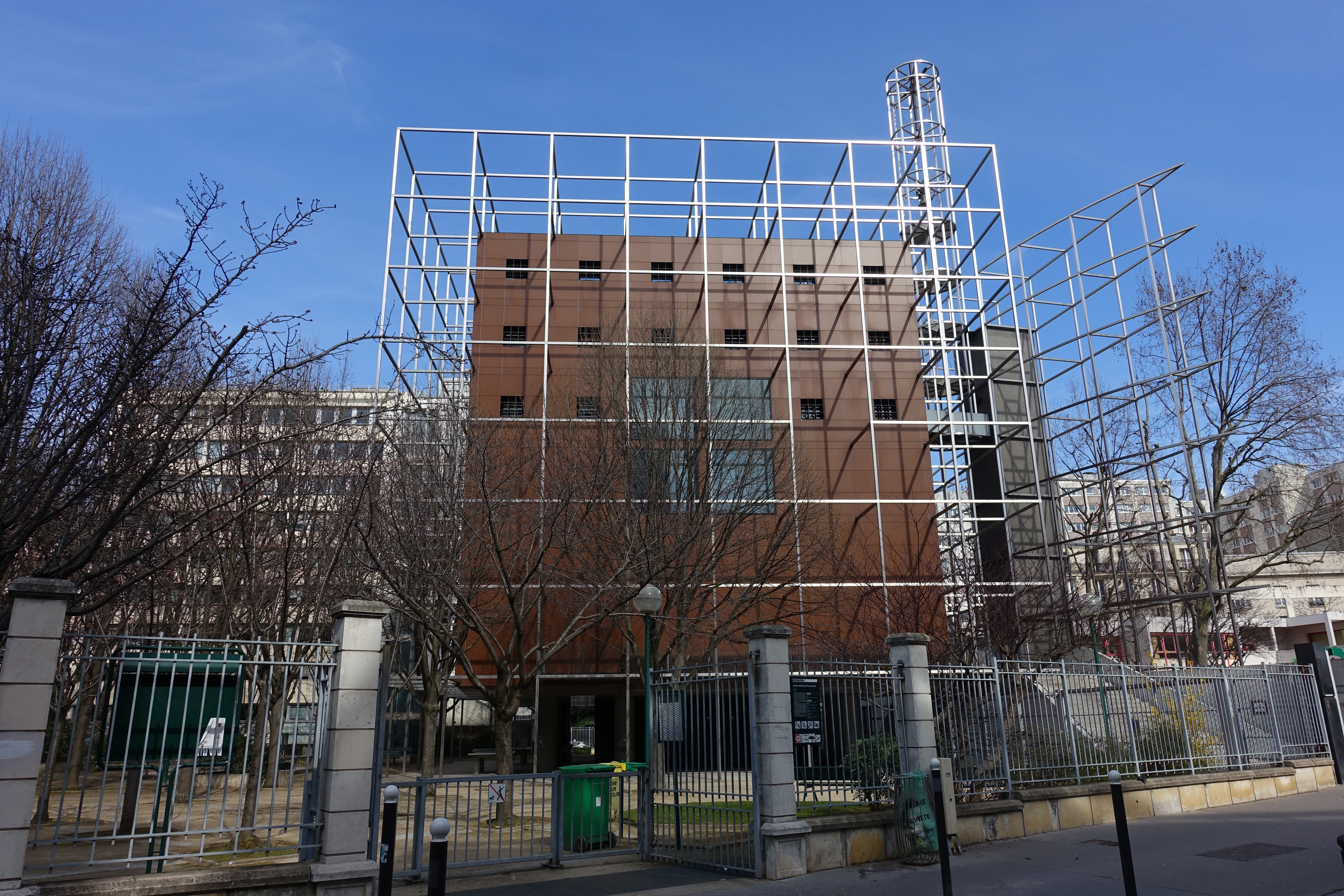
Notre-Dame-de-l'Arche-d'Alliance

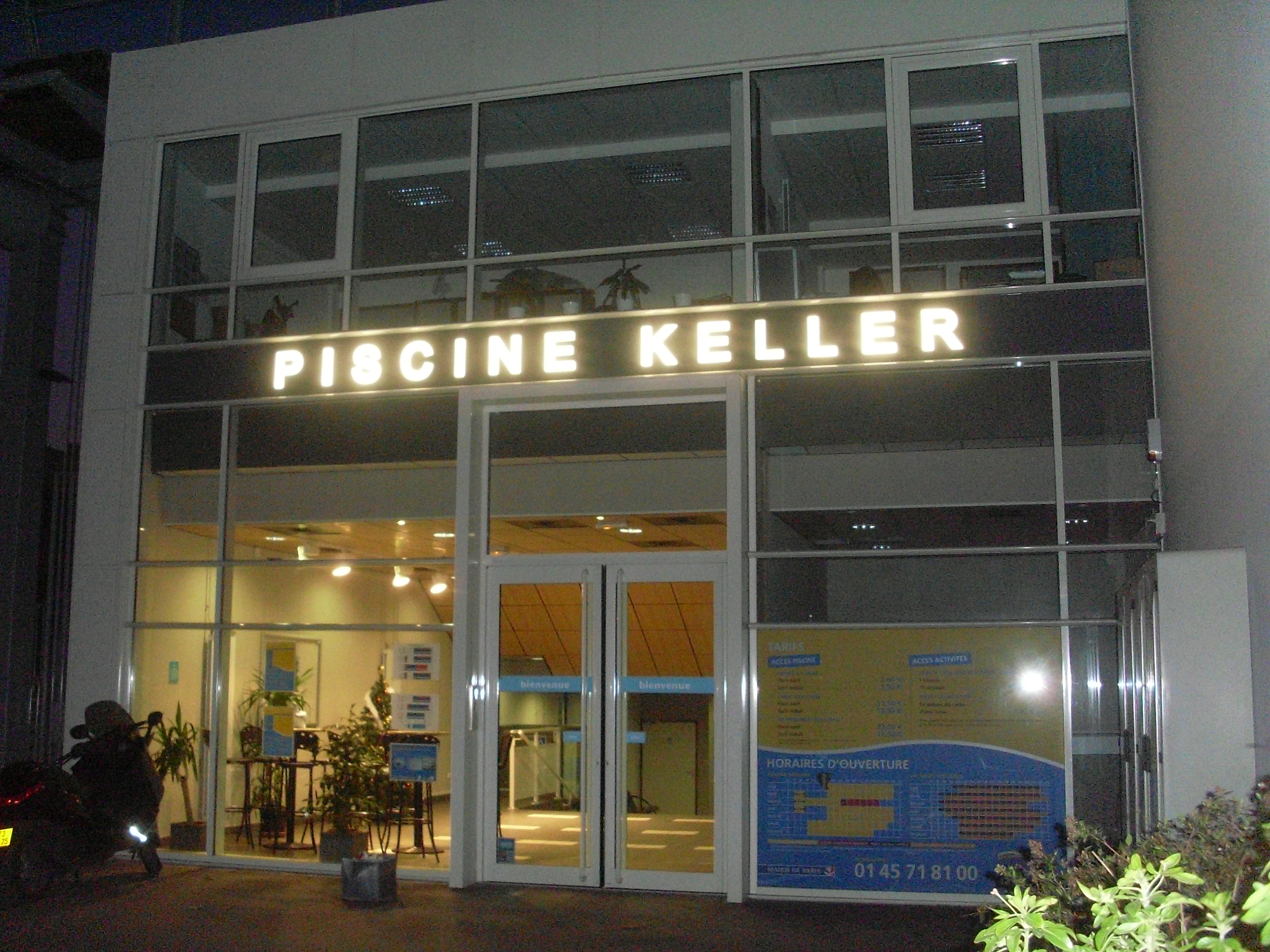
Keller swimming pool

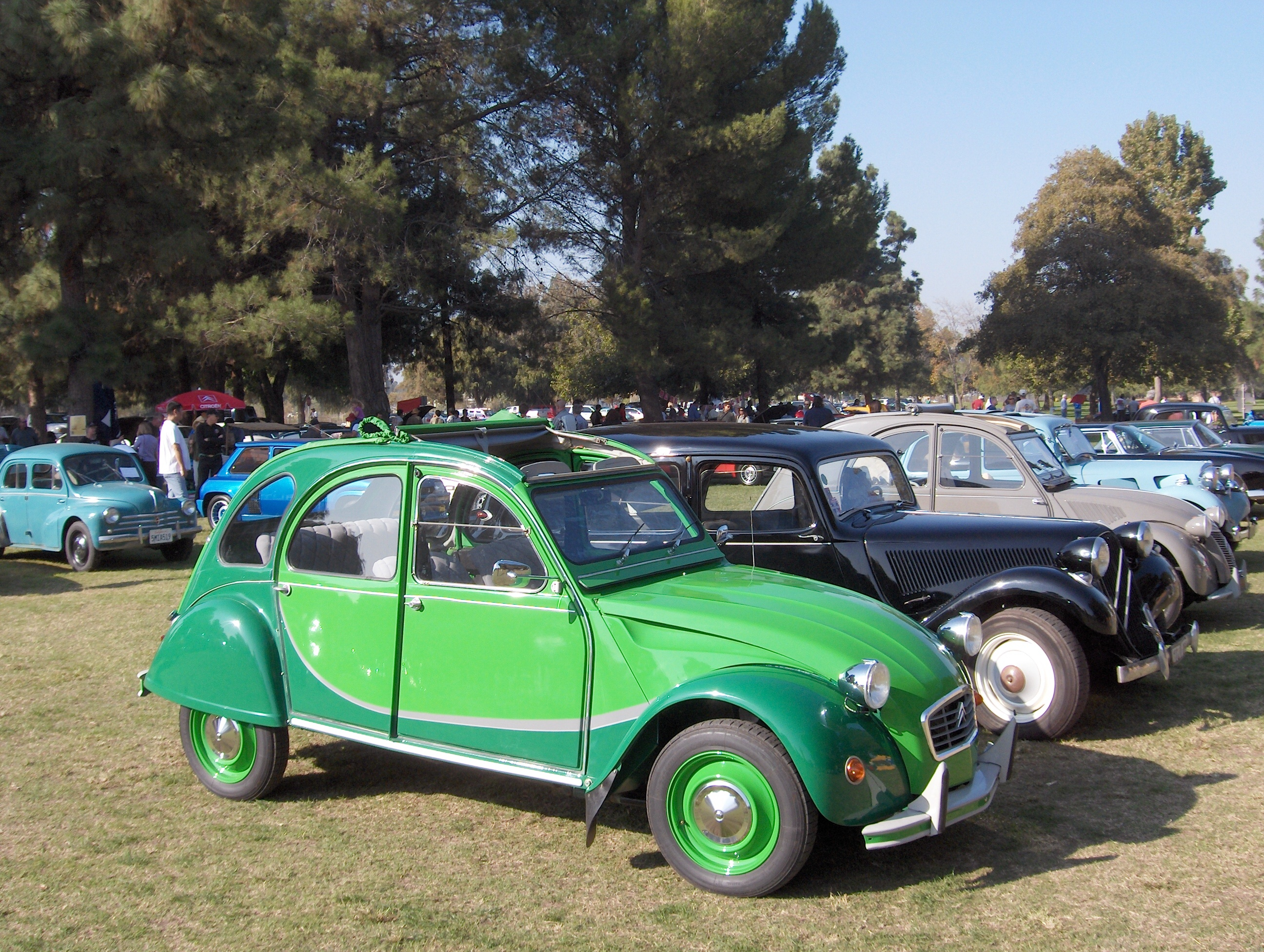
Citroën models

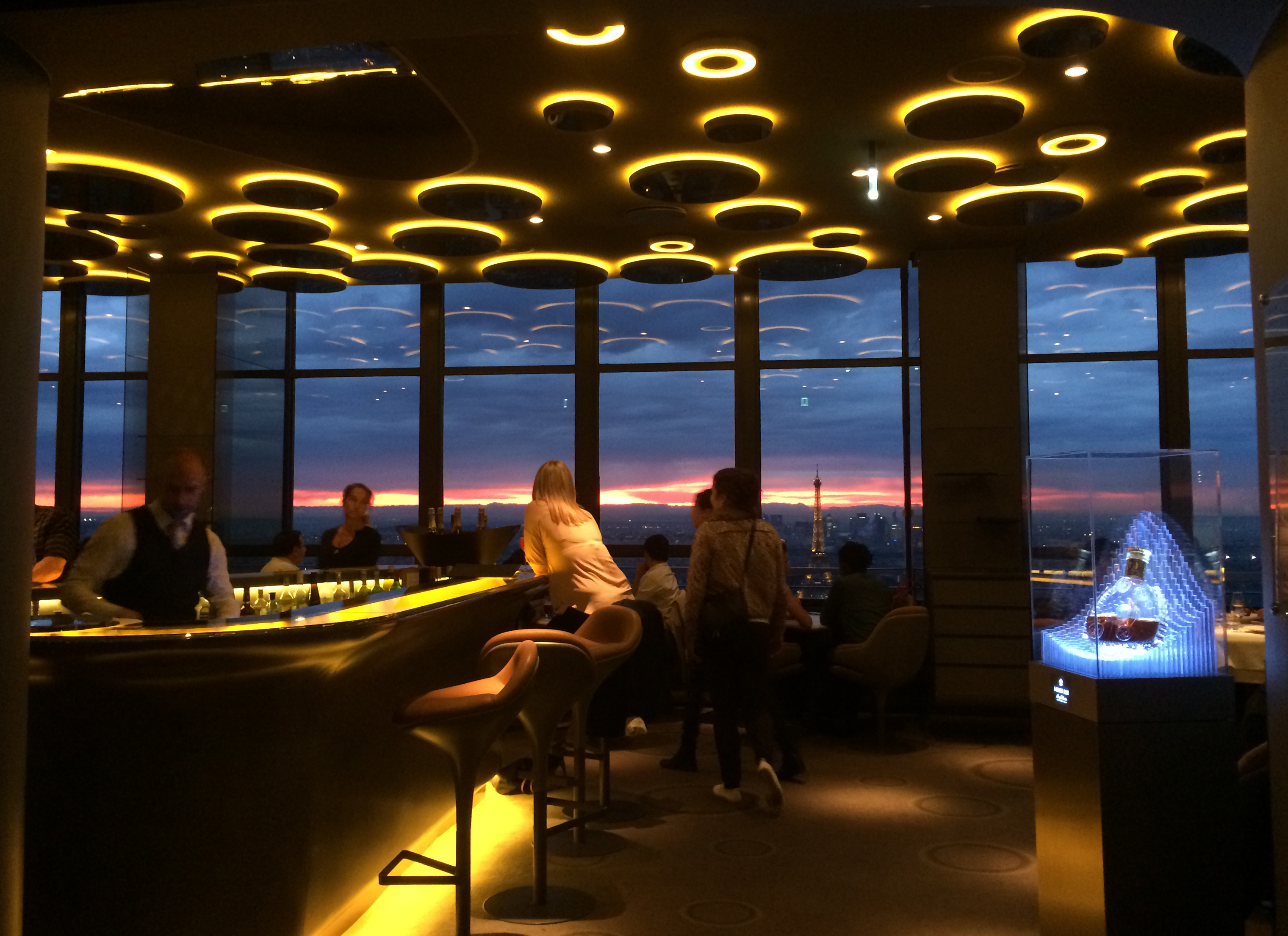
Panoramic restaurant

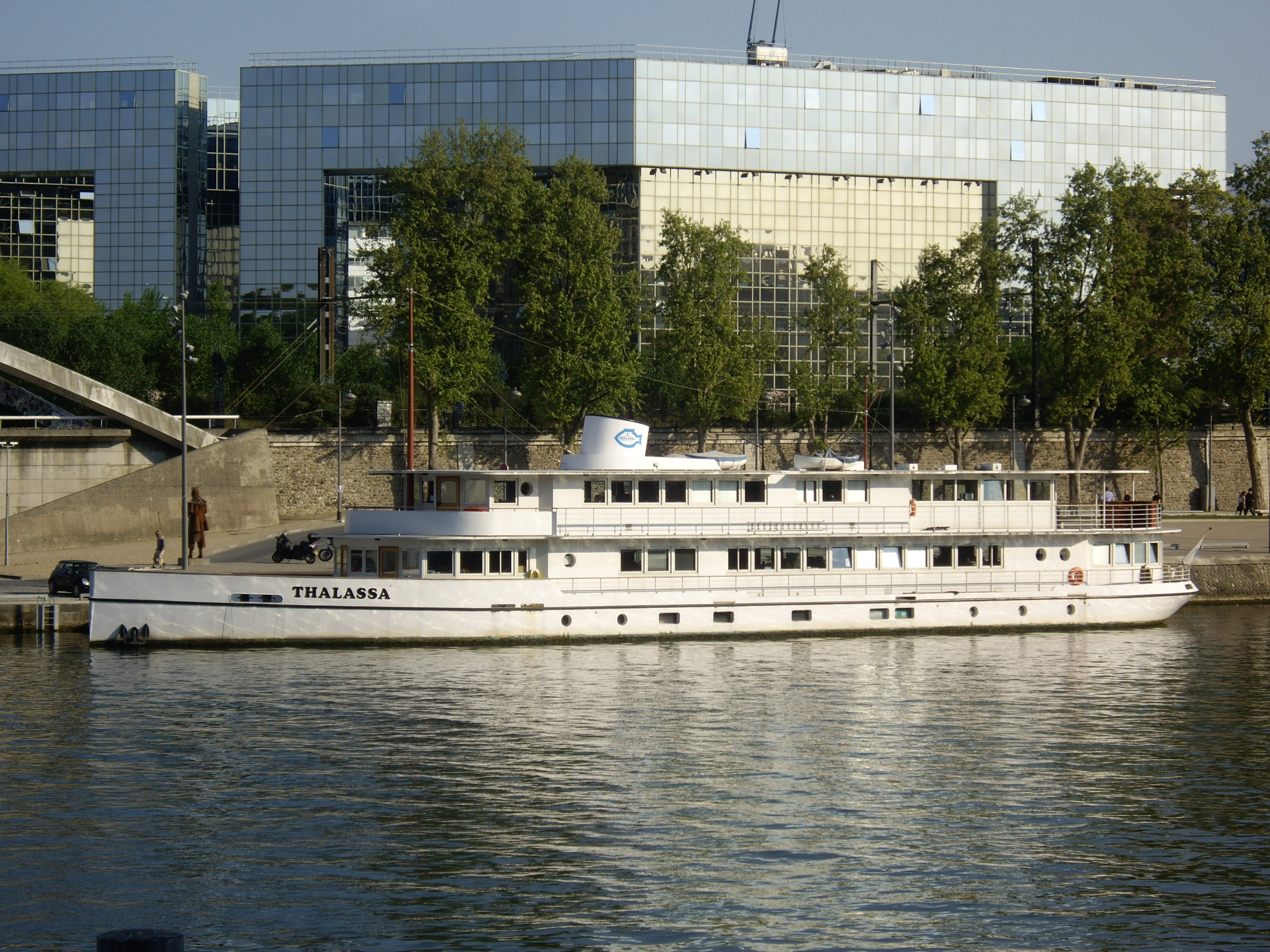
Péniche Thalassa, Quai André-Citroën

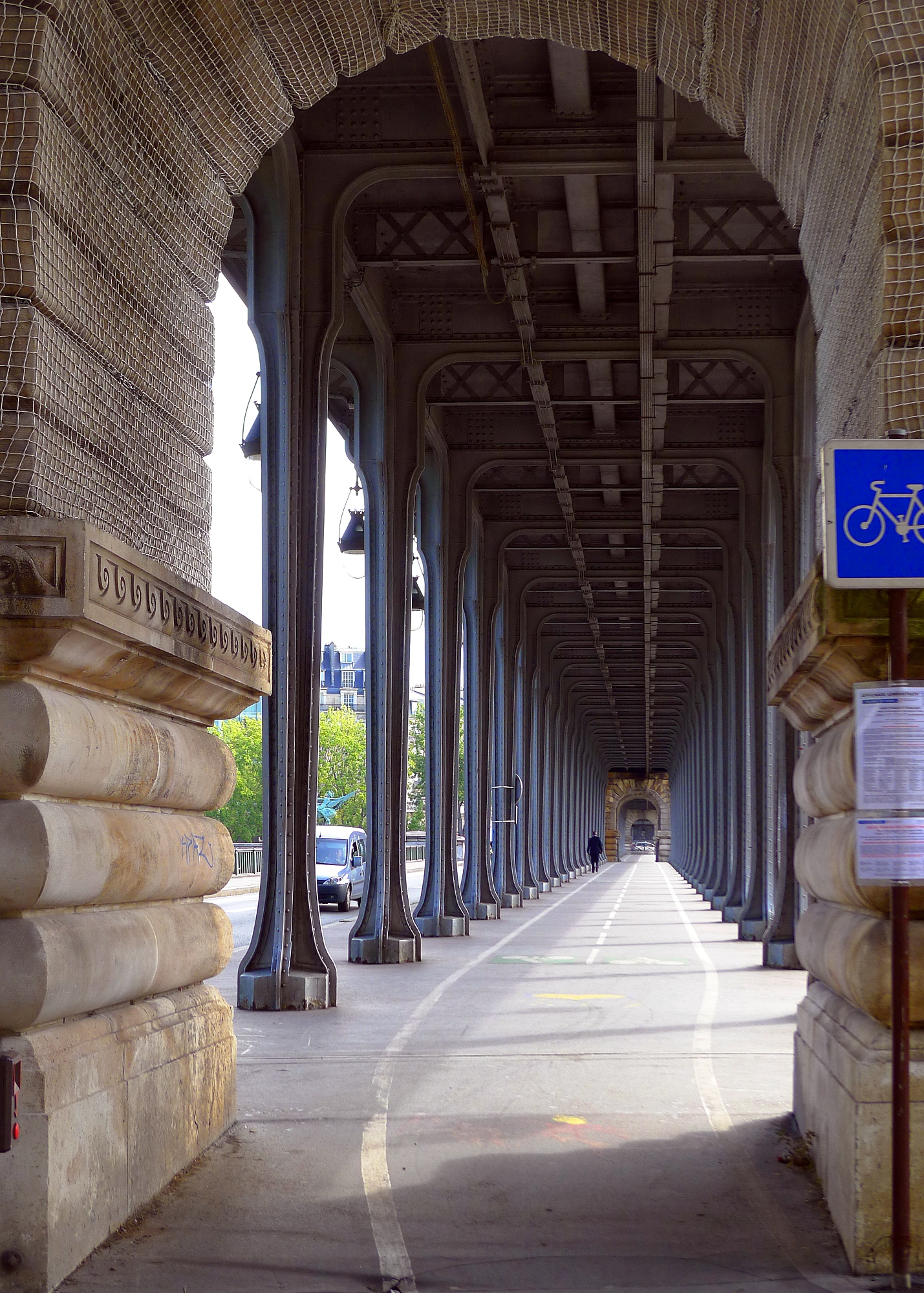
Pont de Bir-Hakeim

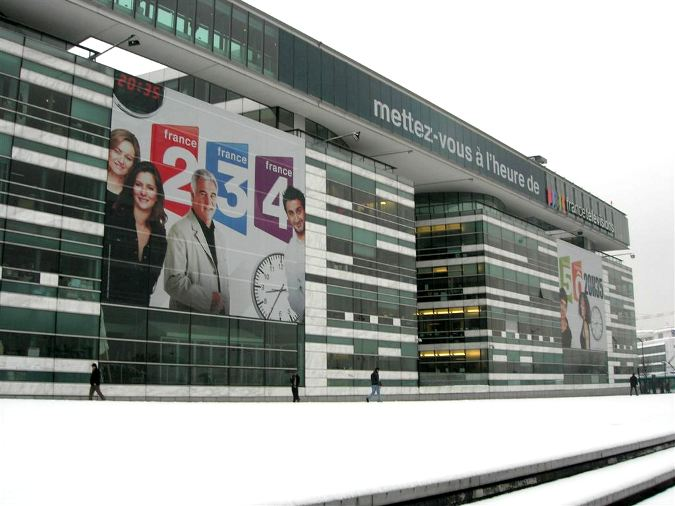
France Télévisions
- Saint-Christophe-de-Javel, Paris
- Notre-Dame-de l'Arche-d'Alliance
- Saint-Antoine-de-Padoue Church, Paris

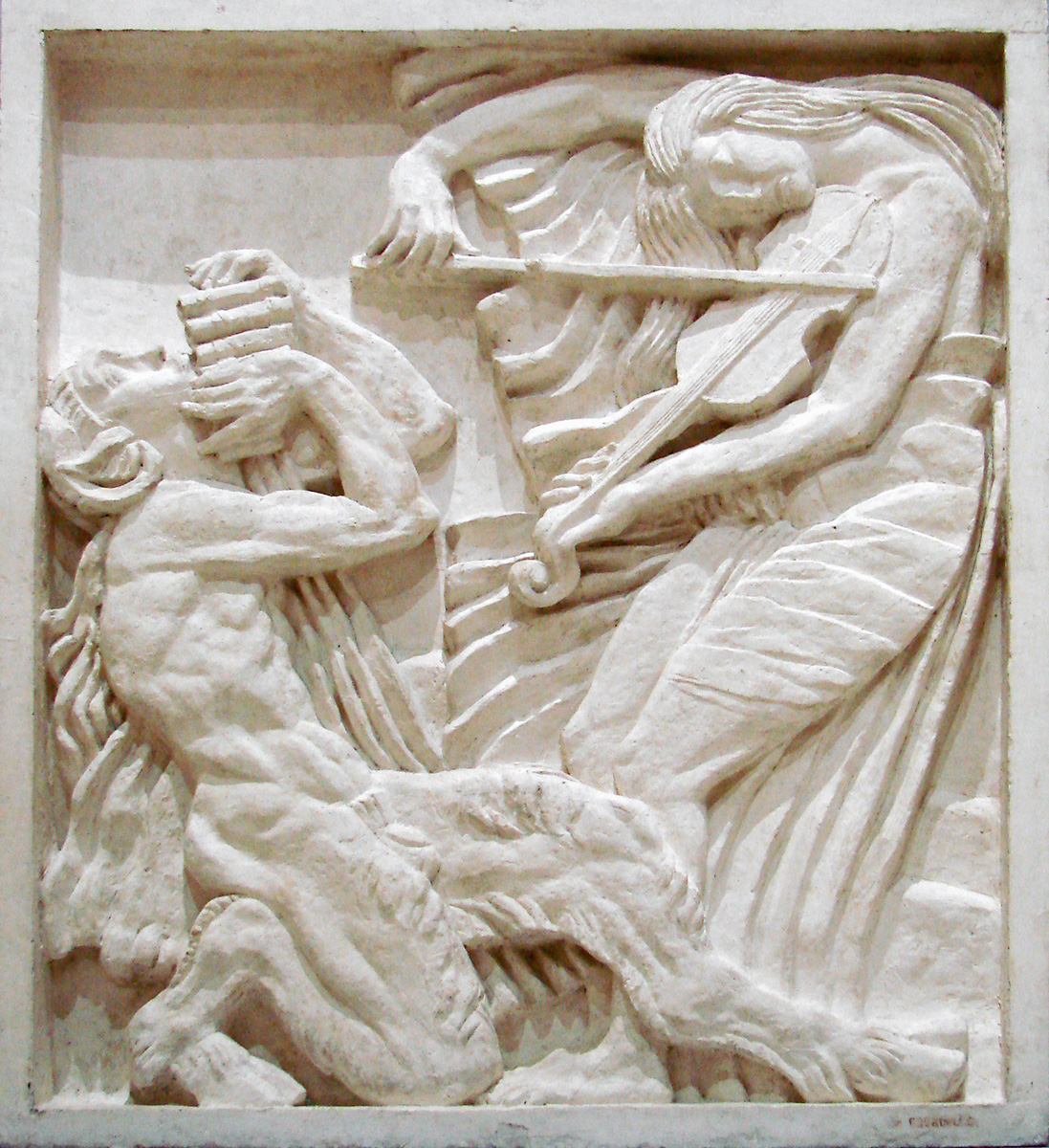
La musique (Musée Bourdelle)

- Grand Pavois de Paris (1971), one of the largest real estate complexes in Paris
- Musée Pasteur
- Musée du Service des Objets Trouvés
- Musée Bourdelle
- Musée Mendjisky, specialising in School of Paris artists, housed in a Robert Mallet-Stevens building.
- Musée Jean Moulin, French Resistance – (musées Leclerc-Moulin)
- Church of Notre-Dame de la Salette in Paris
- Synagogue of Chasseloup-Laubat
- Beaugrenelle Shopping Centre
- Parts of the Montparnasse area.
- The former workshop (no longer standing) of Constantin Brâncuși, where the sculptor worked from 1925 to 1957 has now been relocated in front of the Centre Georges Pompidou
- Villa Santos Dumont where Ossip Zadkine and Fernand Léger had their workshop, also featured in Gail Albert Halaban book Out of my Window, Paris.
- La Ruche
- Square Béla Bartók where the sculpture-fountain Cristaux by Jean-Yves Lechevallier can be seen.
- Square de l'Oiseau-Lunaire, featuring a sculpture by Juan Miró (the L'Oiseau Lunaire) with a plaque commemorating the many artists, poets and painters or sculptors who lived there, including André Masson, Jean Dubuffet, Antonin Artaud and Robert Desnos.
- A replica of the statue of Liberty on the île aux Cygnes where Bartholdi worked.
- The Pont de Bir-Hakeim
- The Pont Mirabeau
- The Parc André-Citroën with the Ballon de Paris
- The Parc Georges-Brassens
- The Polypores Fountain by Jean-Yves Lechevallier featured in the movie by Alain Resnais Same Old Song.
- The Paris Expo Porte de Versailles exhibition centre (with the Tour Triangle project) and Palais des Sports, near Porte de Versailles Métro station
- The Front de Seine high-rise district
- The Cheminée du Front de Seine, a 130 m (430 ft) chimney, the 4th tallest structure in Paris

== Government and infrastructure ==
- At one time the head office of the Bureau Enquêtes-Accidents was in the 15th arrondissement.
- Since November 2015 the French Ministère des Armées ("Ministry of the Armed Forces") has been located in purpose-built building near the Balard Métro station.
- Australian Embassy
- Japanese Cultural Centre in Paris
- Institut Français

== Economy ==
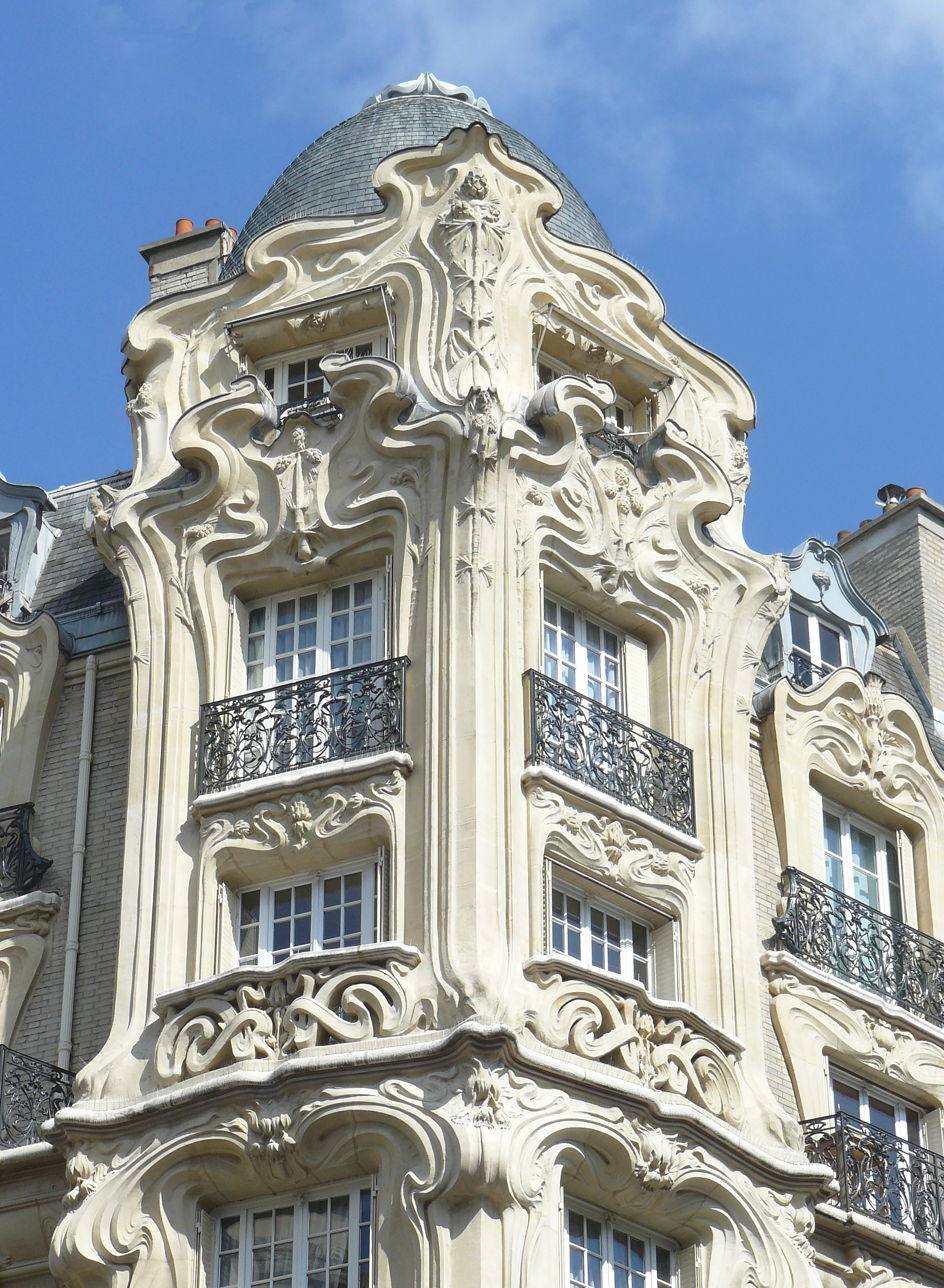
Art Nouveau building, detailed view

- The headquarters of Orange S.A. and Eutelsat are located in the 15th arrondissement.
- La Poste, the French mail service, has its head office in the arrondissement.
- The publisher Hachette Livre also has its headquarters in the arrondissement.
- Prior to the completion of the current Air France headquarters in Tremblay-en-France in December 1995, Air France was headquartered in a tower located next to the Gare Montparnasse rail station in Montparnasse and in the 15th arrondissement; Air France had its headquarters in the tower for about 30 years.
- Previously Tour Maine-Montparnasse housed the executive management of Accor.
- Journal officiel de la République française
- French Football Federation
- Conseil supérieur de l'audiovisuel
- Safran
- Institut français des relations internationales
- European Space Agency
- International Energy Agency
- Eutelsat
- France Télévisions
- International Council of Museums
- Hôpital Européen Georges-Pompidou
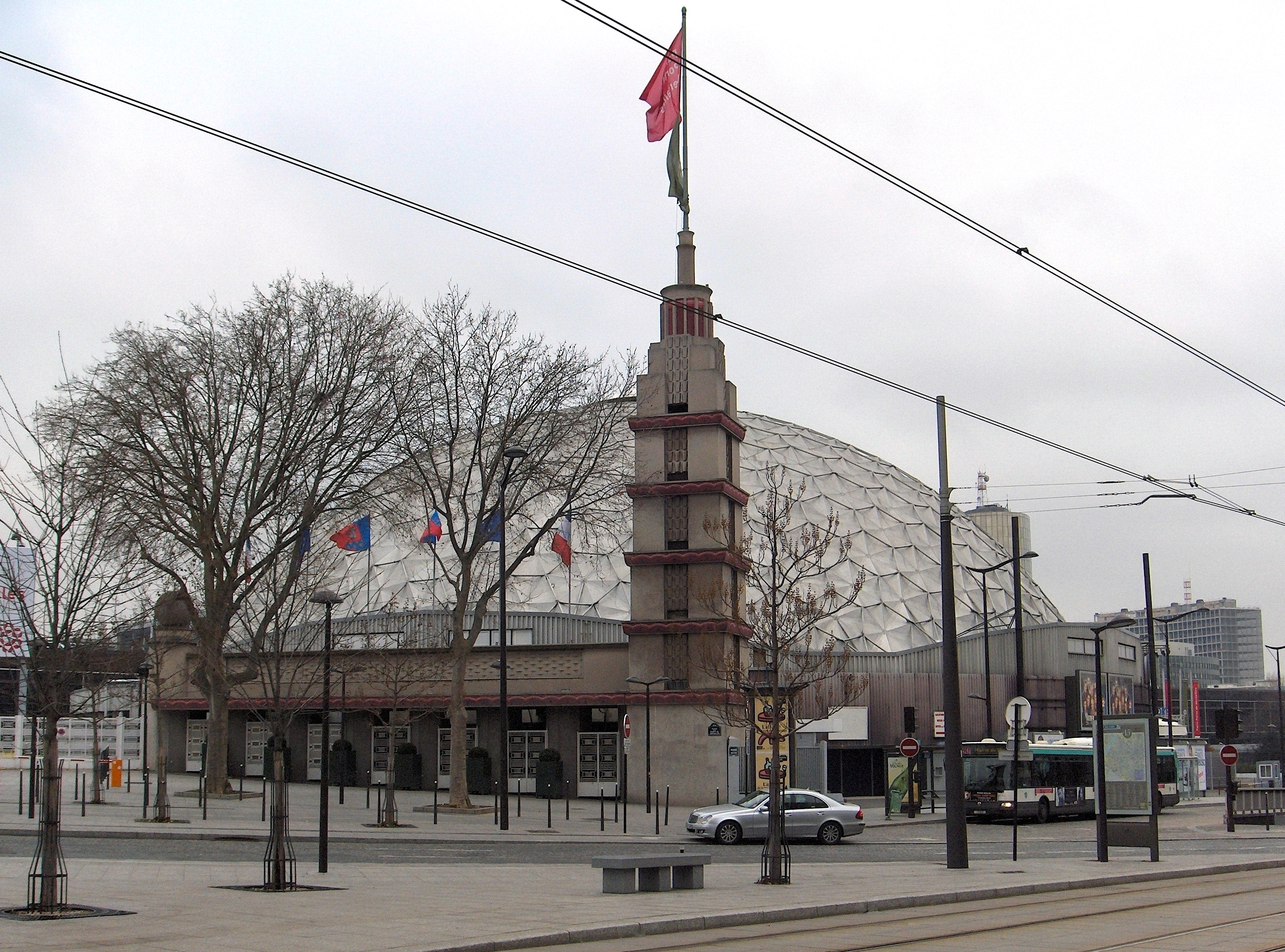
Palais des Sports de Paris

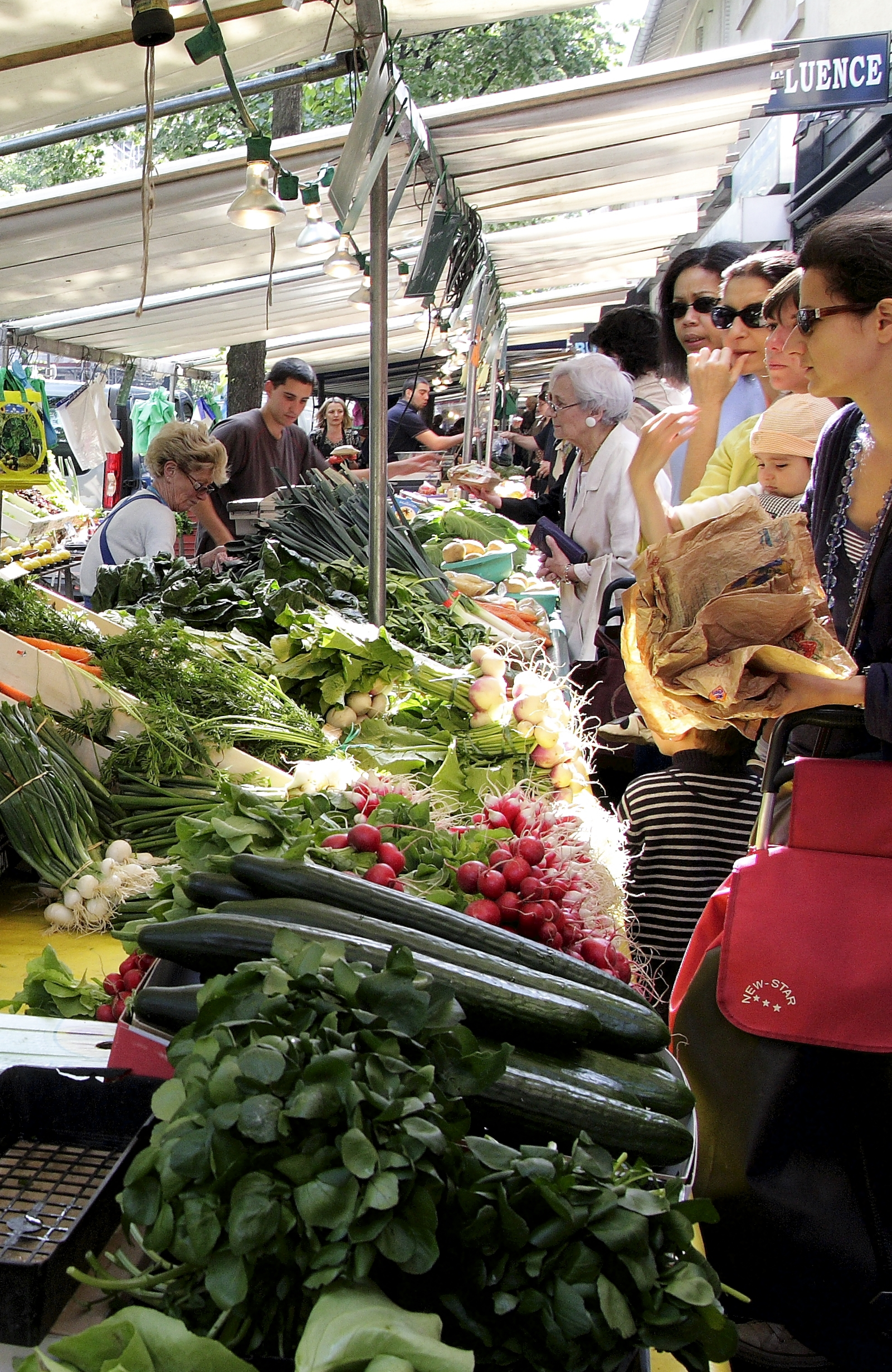
Marché de la rue de la Convention

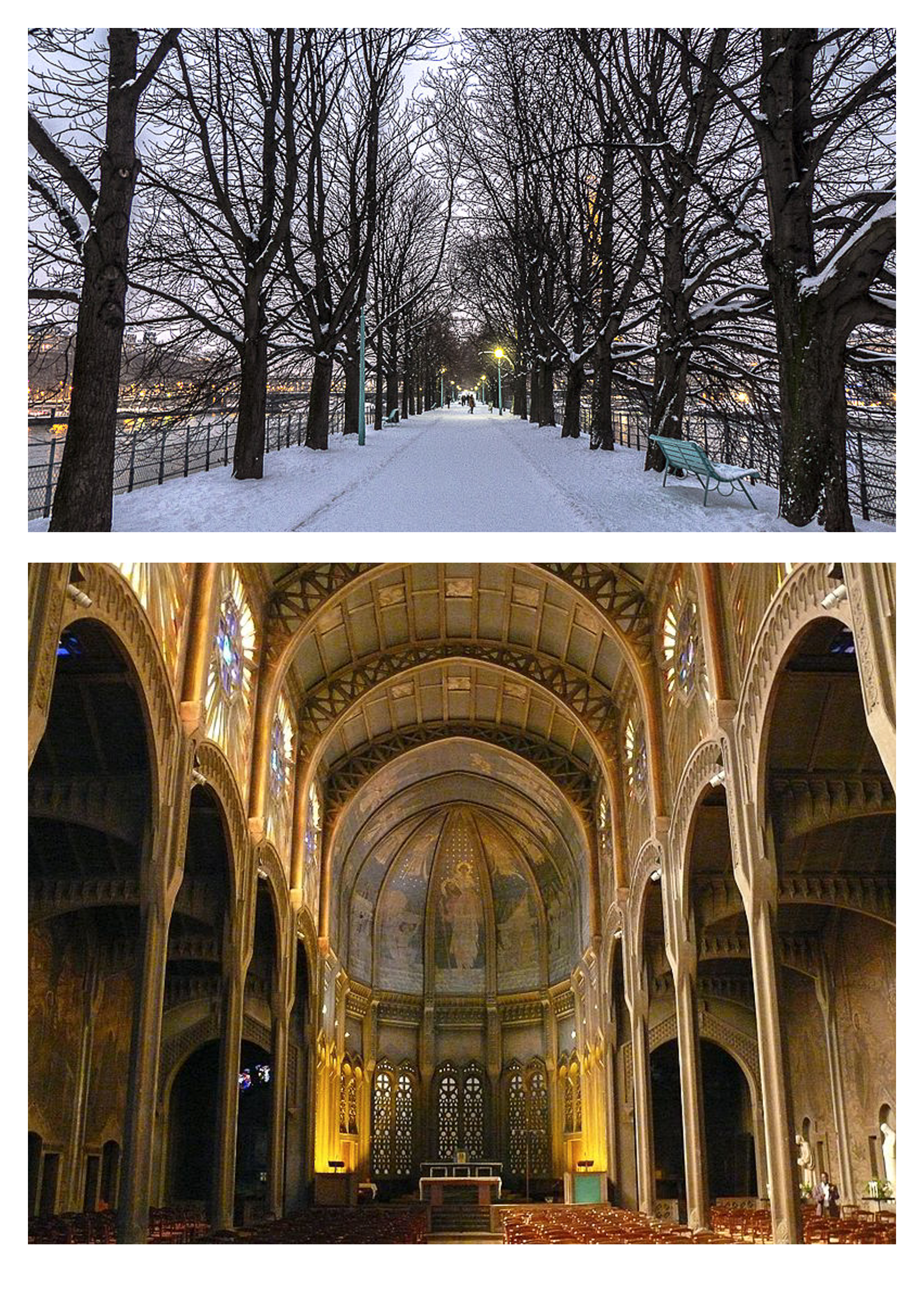
Île aux Cygnes and St Christophe Church

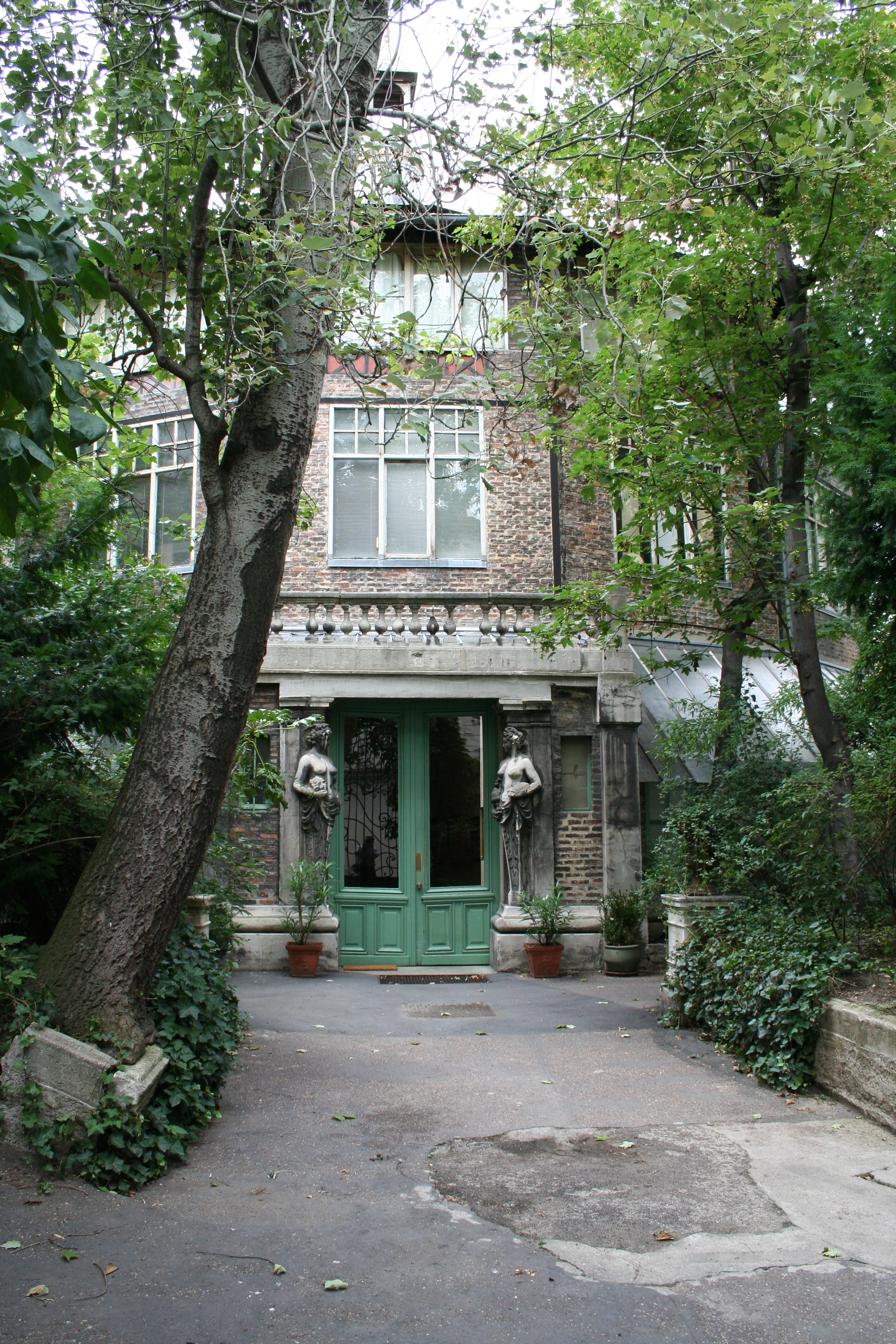
Entrance to "La Ruche"

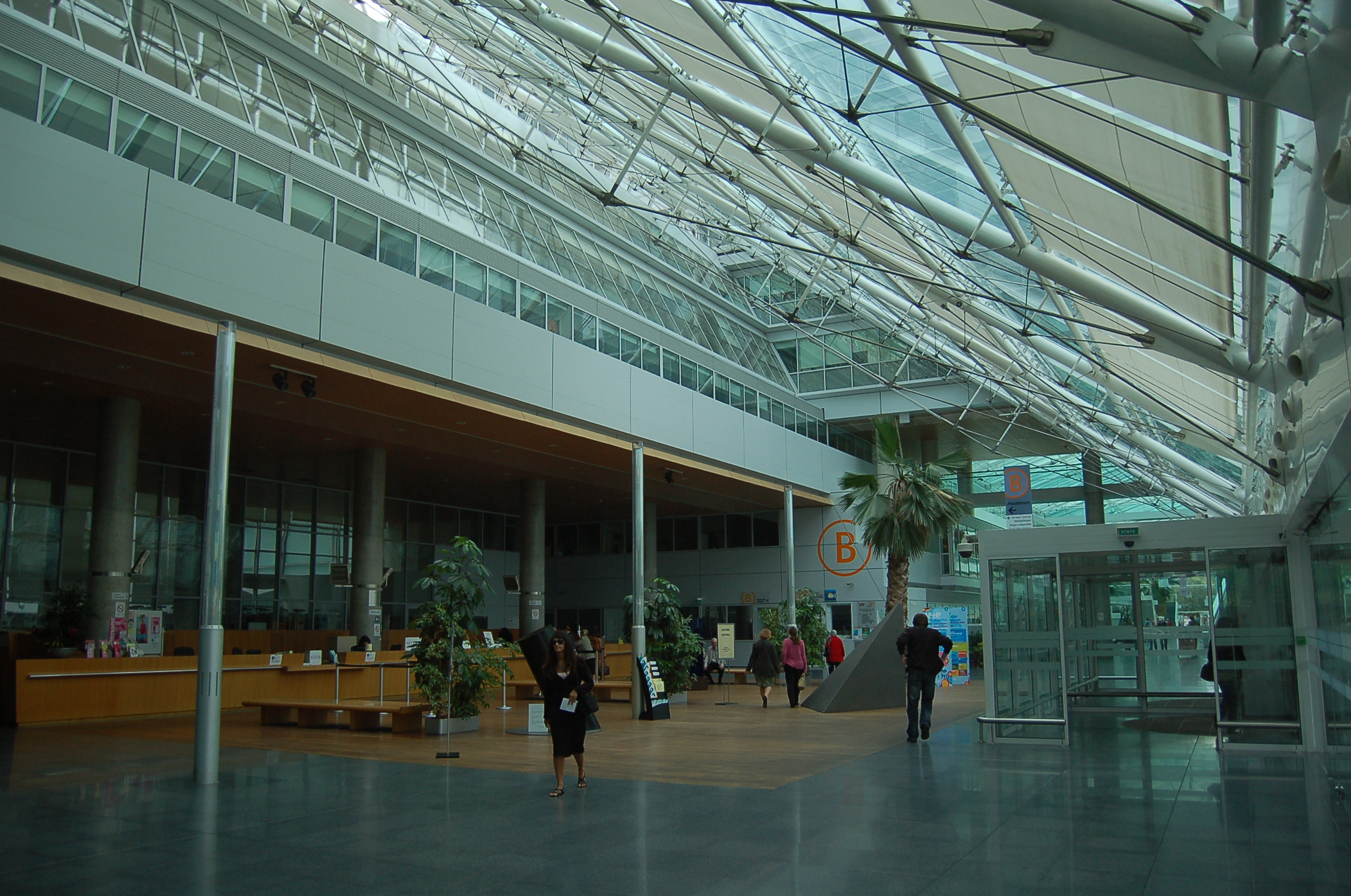
European Hospital Georges-Pompidou, Hall

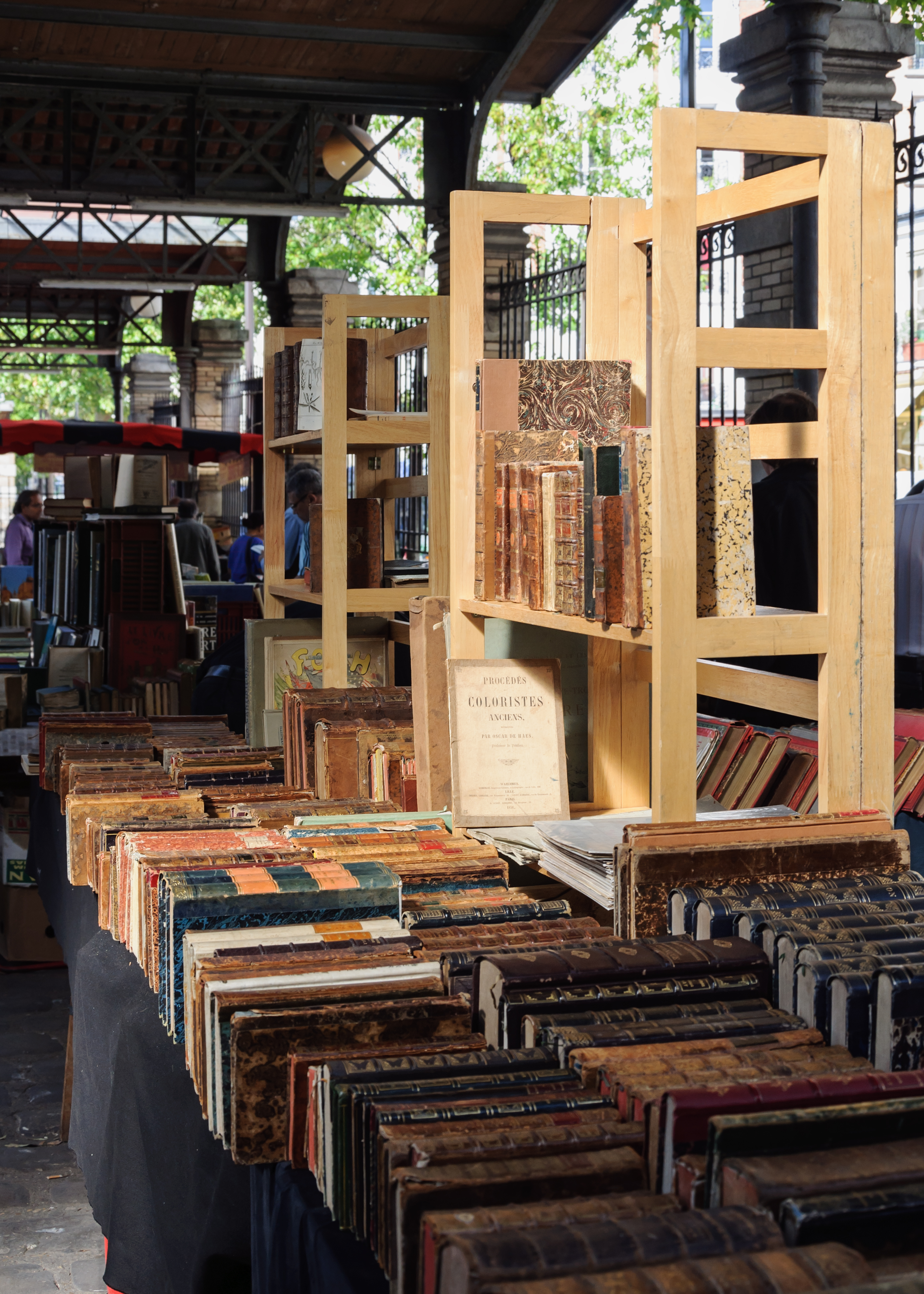
Marché du livre ancien Georges Brassens

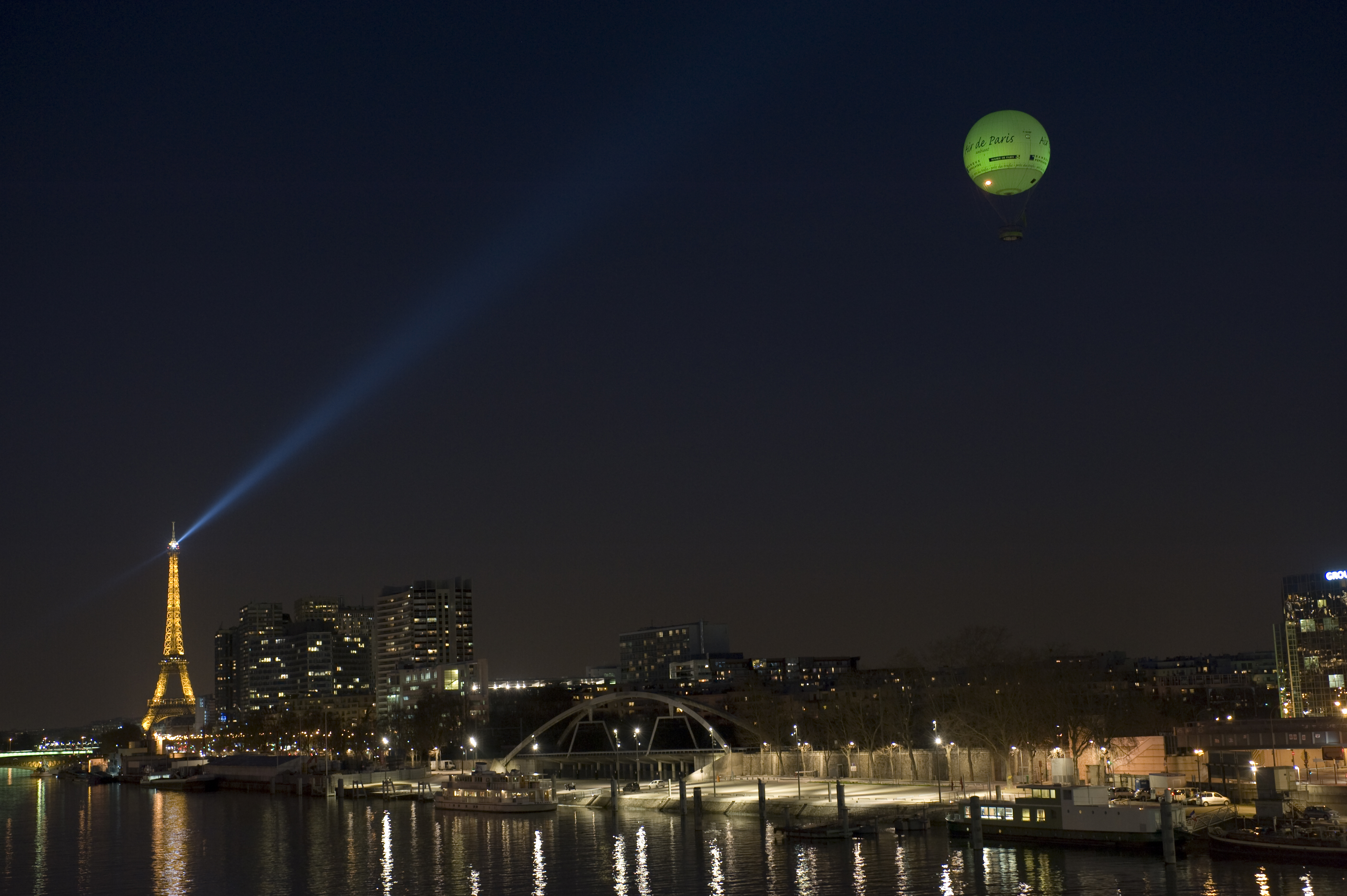
Balloon "Air de Paris"

== Education and research ==
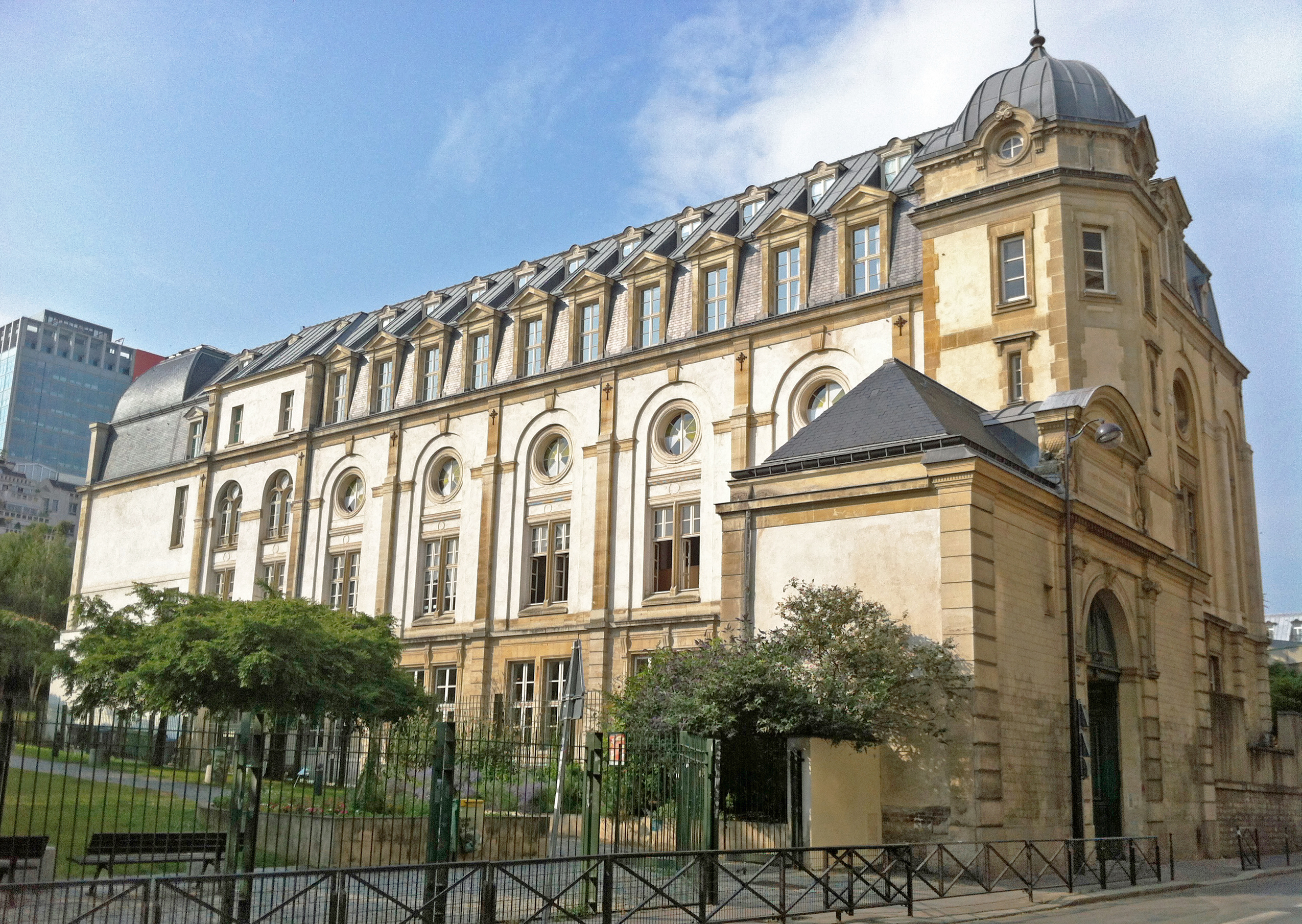
Panthéon-Assas University – Vaugirard

- Schiller International University has a campus in the arrondissement. It is in proximity to Place de la Convention.
- The arrondissement is also host to the École Active Bilingue Jeannine Manuel international school and the international bilingual school, Victor Hugo
- International Culinary school Le Cordon Bleu, established in 1895, has a campus in the 15th (rue Léon Delhomme)
- Necker-Enfants Malades Hospital affiliated to the University of Paris Descartes, (pediatrics)
- Pantheon-Sorbonne University, Saint Charles Campus - Visual arts and aesthetics.
- Panthéon-Assas University, Campus Vaugirard, Law school
- PariSanté Campus
- Pasteur Institute
- Laboratoire de Phonétique et Phonologie

== Notable people ==
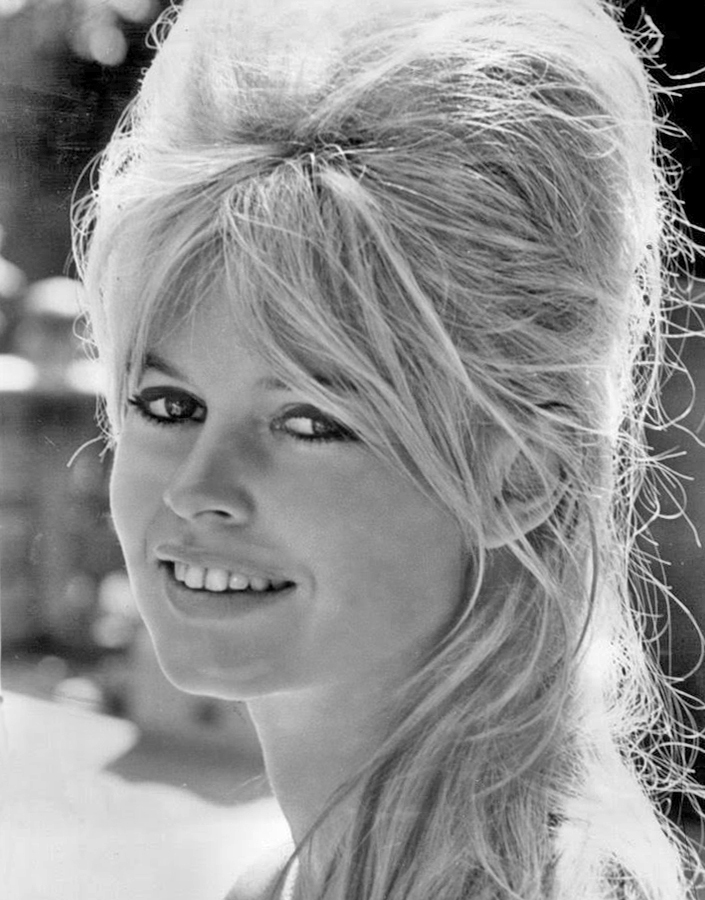
Brigitte Bardot – 1962

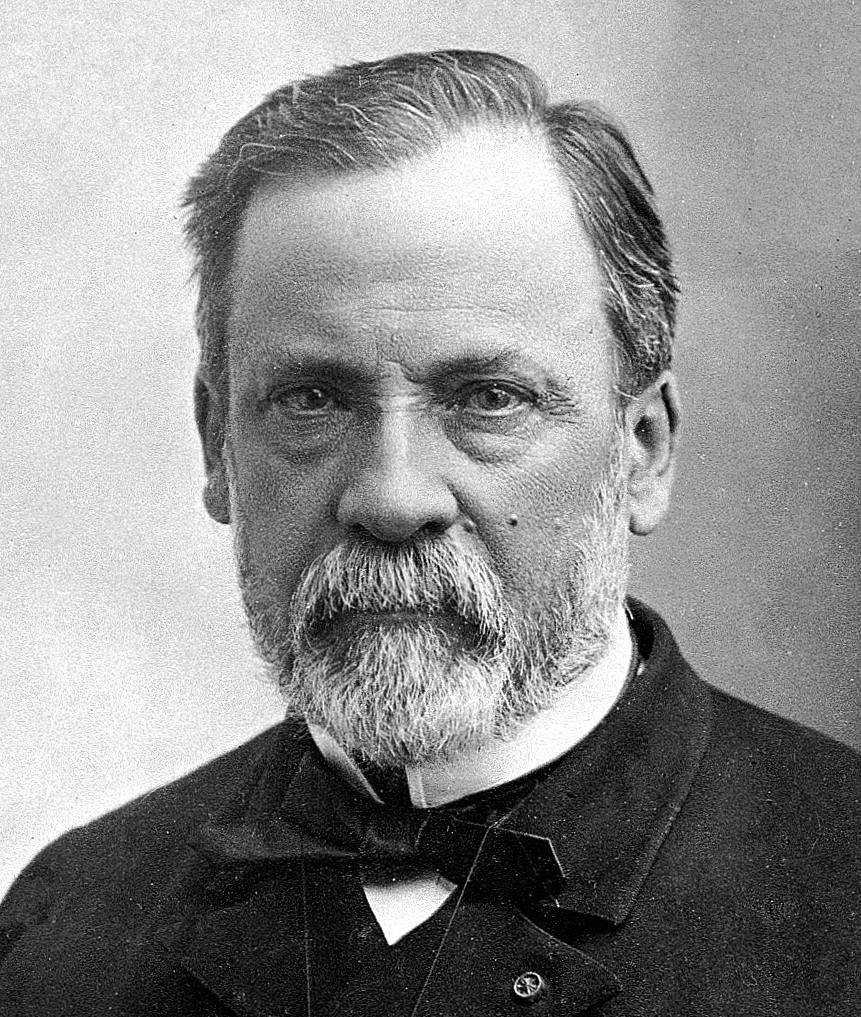
Louis Pasteur by Félix Nadar in 1878

- Édouard Balladur, politician, Prime Minister of France (1993–1995)
- Brigitte Bardot, actress (1934–2025)
- Samuel Beckett, writer, who lived in the 15th arrondissement for most of his adult life
- Walter Benjamin, philosopher
- Luc Besson, filmmaker
- Antoine Bourdelle, artist
- Alexander Calder, artist
- Marc Chagall, artist
- Barbara Chase-Riboud, artist
- Dietrich von Choltitz, military governor of Paris, 1944–1945
- André Citroën, industrialist
- Robert Desnos, poet and member of the French Resistance
- Michel Foucault, philosopher
- Tsuguharu Foujita, artist
- Rebecca Hampton, actress and television presenter
- François Hollande, President of France (2012–2017), lived in the 15th arrondissement.
- René Magritte, artist
- Sophie Marceau, actress
- André Masson, artist
- Henry Miller, writer, lived in the 15th where he worked on Tropic of Cancer.
- Joan Miró, artist
- Jacques Monod and Francois Jacob discovered the mechanism of genes' transcription regulation, a work honored by the 1965 Nobel Prize in Physiology or Medicine.
- Luc Montagnier, Françoise Barré-Sinoussi and colleagues discovered the two HIV viruses that cause AIDS, in 1983 and 1985, were honored by the 2008 Nobel Prize in Physiology or Medicine.
- Nekfeu, hip-hop artist
- Louis Pasteur, microbiologist
- Marie-Claire Pauwels, journalist
- Marc du Pontavice, producer
- Ossip Zadkine, artist

== See also ==
- Front de Seine
- Saint-Lambert Church of Vaugirard
