= Notre-Dame-de-l'Arche-d'Alliance =

Catholic church in Paris

Coordinates: 48°50′12″N 2°18′31″E

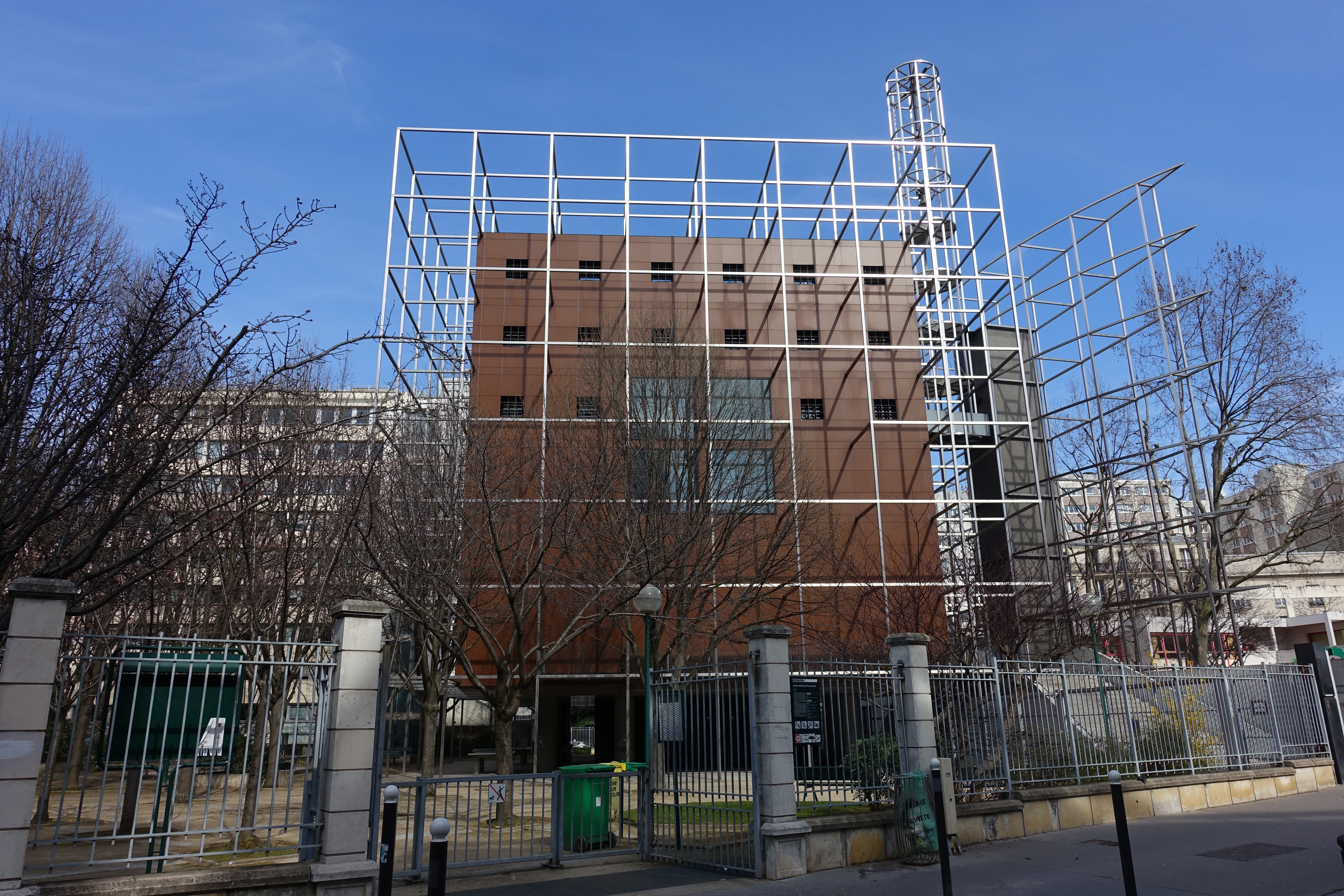
- Notre-Dame-de l'Arche-d'Alliance

Religion
- Affiliation: Catholic Church
- Province: Archdiocese of Paris
- Rite: Roman Rite

Location
- Location: 81 Rue d'Alleray, 15th arrondissement of Paris
- Interactive map of Notre-Dame-de-l'Arche-d'Alliance

Architecture
- Style: Modern architecture
- Groundbreaking: 1996
- Completed: 1999

Notre-Dame-de-l-Arche-d'Alliance is a modern cube-shaped Catholic church located at 81 rue d'Alleray in the 15th arrondissement of Paris. It was designed by the firm Architecture-Studio and was built between 1996 and 1999

== History ==
The church was built in response to the rapid increase of population in the Left Bank of the Seine and the neighbourhood. parish. The name of the church comes from the Latin "Arca" or Chest", the case in which Moses protected the tablets inscribed with the principles of Christianity, The small side of the plot of the site made it necessary to make the maximum use of the available space.

== Exterior ==
The church is in the form of a perfect cube, eighteen by eighteen meters in size. The cube is supported by twelve pillars, which symbolise the twelve tribes of Israel and the twelve Apostles. The exterior is composed of resin panels reinforced with wood fibres. Over the panels is a decorative surface painted to resemble wood. The facades are entirely covered with an inscription of a prayer to the Virgin Mary, "Je Vous Salle Marie," or "Hail Mary".

Surrounding the cube is a stainless steel framework which seems to shine at night. Next to the church is the bell tower, a slender stainless steel lance with the bells clearly visible inside.

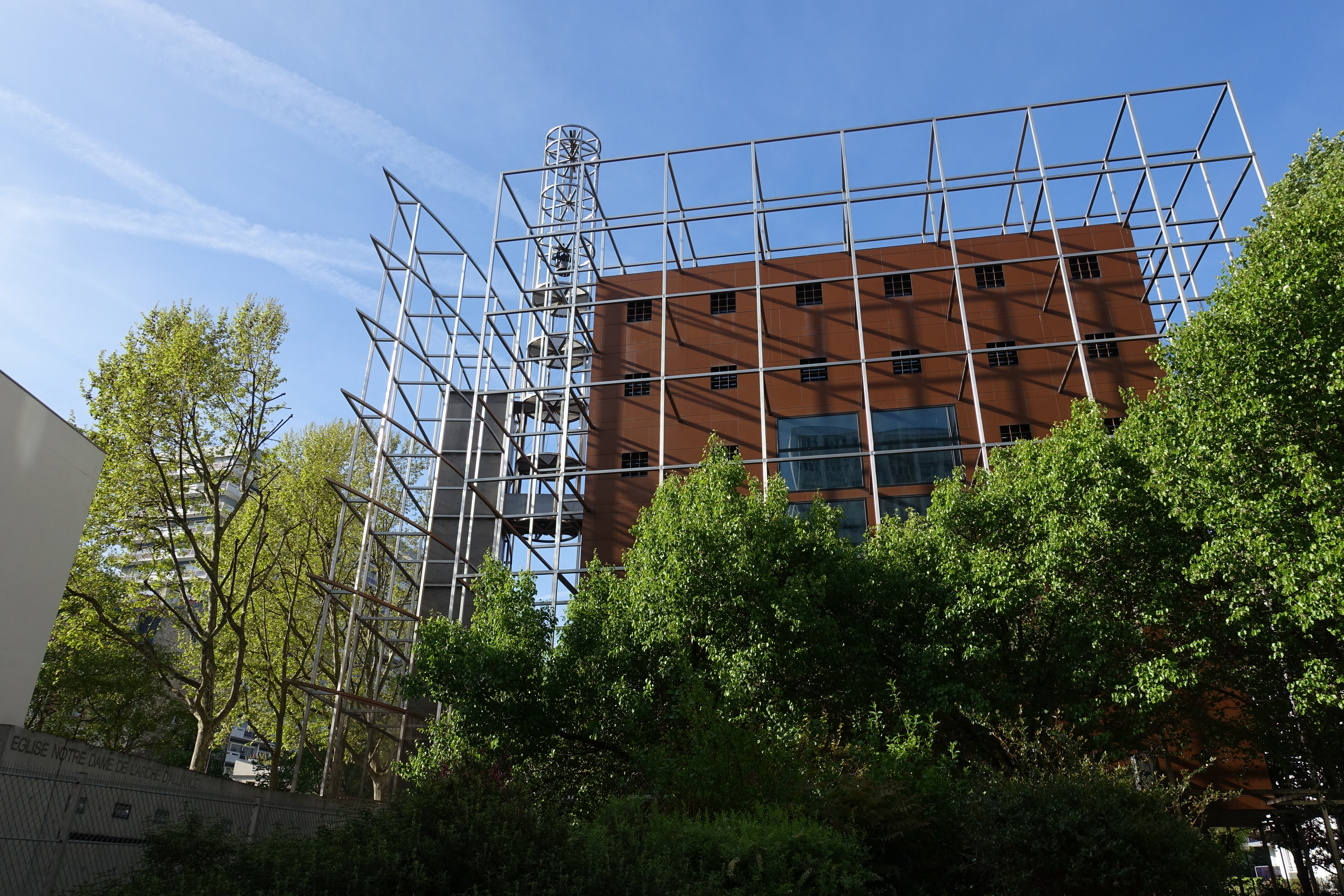

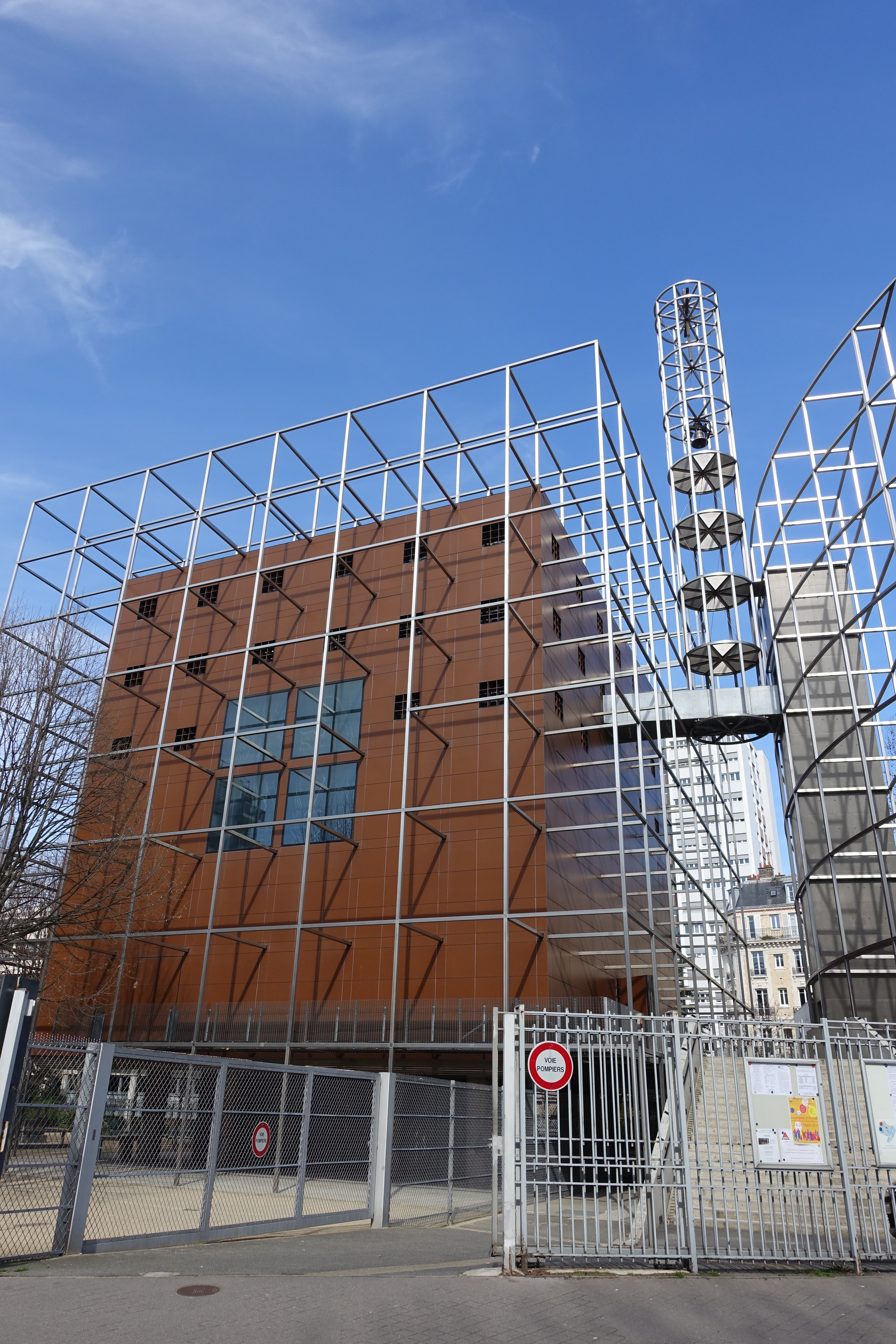
The church and bell tower

== Interior ==
The interior of the church is in the form of a Greek Cross. A metallic screen separates the nave from the sanctuary of the apse.

Two large stained glass windows, designed by Martial Raysse and made by Jean-Dominique Fleury, depict scenes from the Old Testament and New Testament. One illustrates David dancing in front of the Biblical arch, after the Philistines have returned the arch to the Israelis, as recounted in the Second Book of Samuel, 6, 14-21. The second window represents Mary, pregnant with the Christ child, hurrying to visit her cousin Elizabeth, who is soon going to give birth to John the Baptist.|

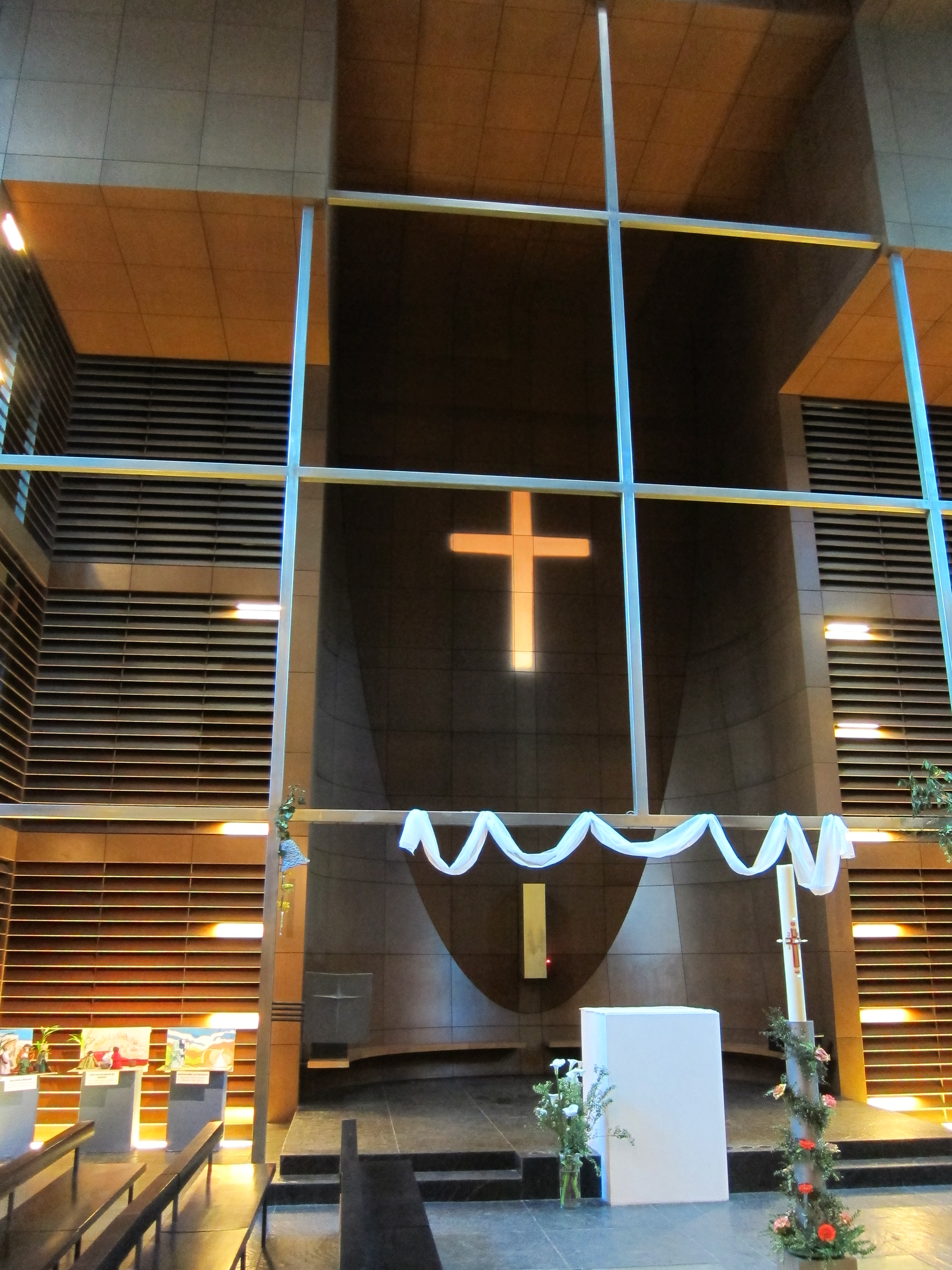
The Choir

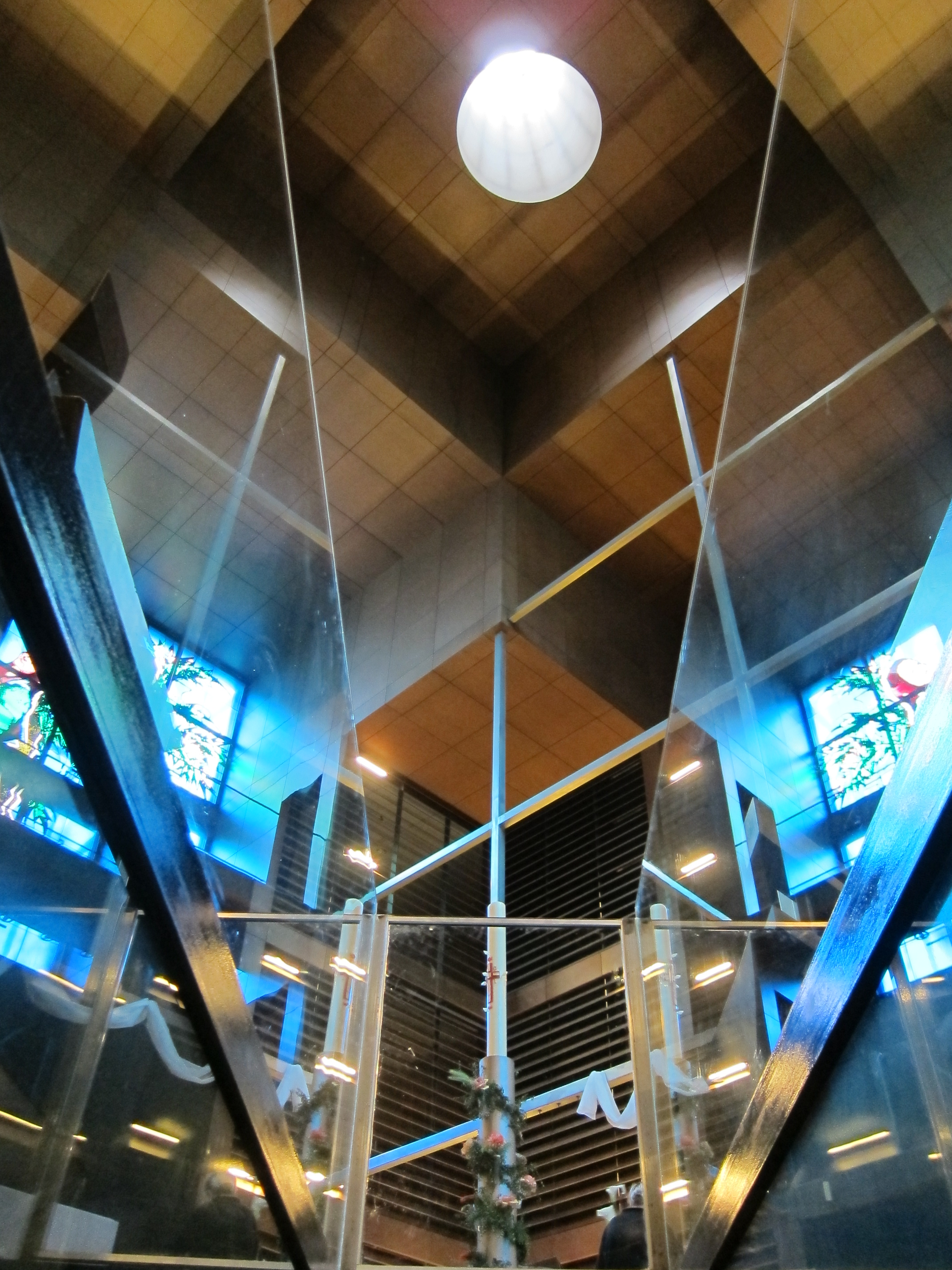
The staircase of the nave
