= Fontaine du Puits de Grenelle =

Fountain in Paris, France

Coordinates: 48°50′49″N 2°18′36″E

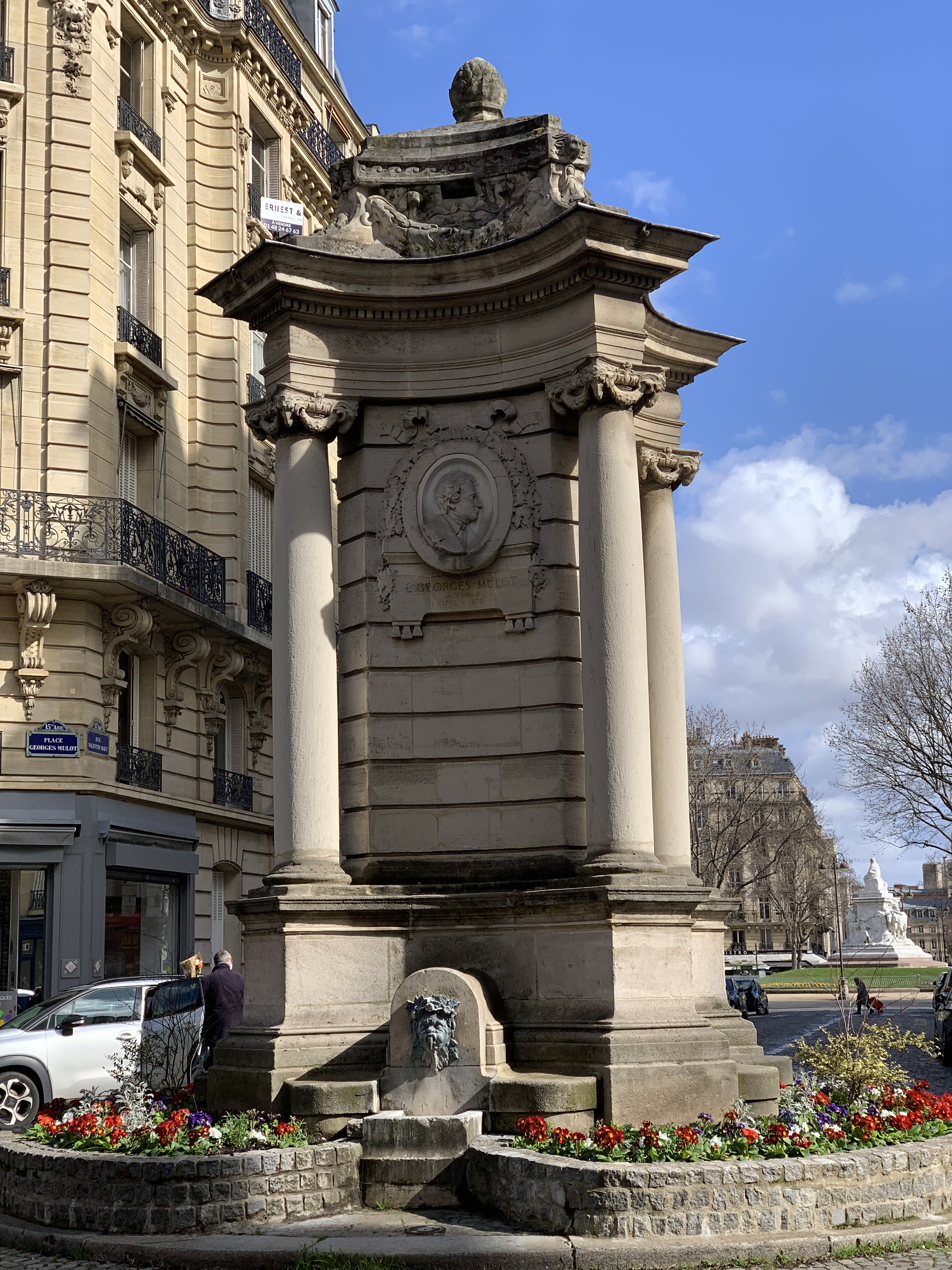
The Fontaine du Puits de Grenelle, 2021

The Fontaine du Puits de Grenelle is a fountain on Place Georges-Mulot in the 15th arrondissement of Paris, France, built in 1906.

== History ==
This fountain was built on the site of the first artesian borehole in Paris carried out from 1833 to 1841. At this site, the Grenelle slaughterhouses were located at the time. The engineer Louis-Georges Mulot directed the work, helped by François Arago, his name was given to the place where the fountain is located. Water was found at 548 meters. The catchment, conveyed in an underground pipe, sprang from a monumental metal tower 42 meters high, built in 1858 on the Place de Breteuil, a few hundred meters away. It was destroyed in 1903.

== Description ==
The fountain is in the form of a monumental block of cut stone in a square section framed by columns. On each of its faces are affixed stone medallions representing figures whose name is honored by the streets that converge in the surrounding part of the 15th district.

== Bibliography ==
- Marie-Hélène Levadé (photogr. Hughes Marcouyeau), Les Fontaines de Paris : L'eau pour le plaisir, Paris et Bruxelles, Éditions Chapitre Douze, 2006, 592 p. (ISBN 978-2-915345-05-6).
- Dominique Massounie (dir.), Pauline Prévost-Marcilhacy (dir.) et Daniel Rabreau (dir.), Paris et ses fontaines : De la Renaissance à nos jours, Paris, Délégation à l'action artistique de la ville de Paris, coll. « Paris et son patrimoine », 1995, 318 p. (ISBN 2-905-118-80-6).
