= Boucicaut station =

Metro station in Paris, France

Boucicaut
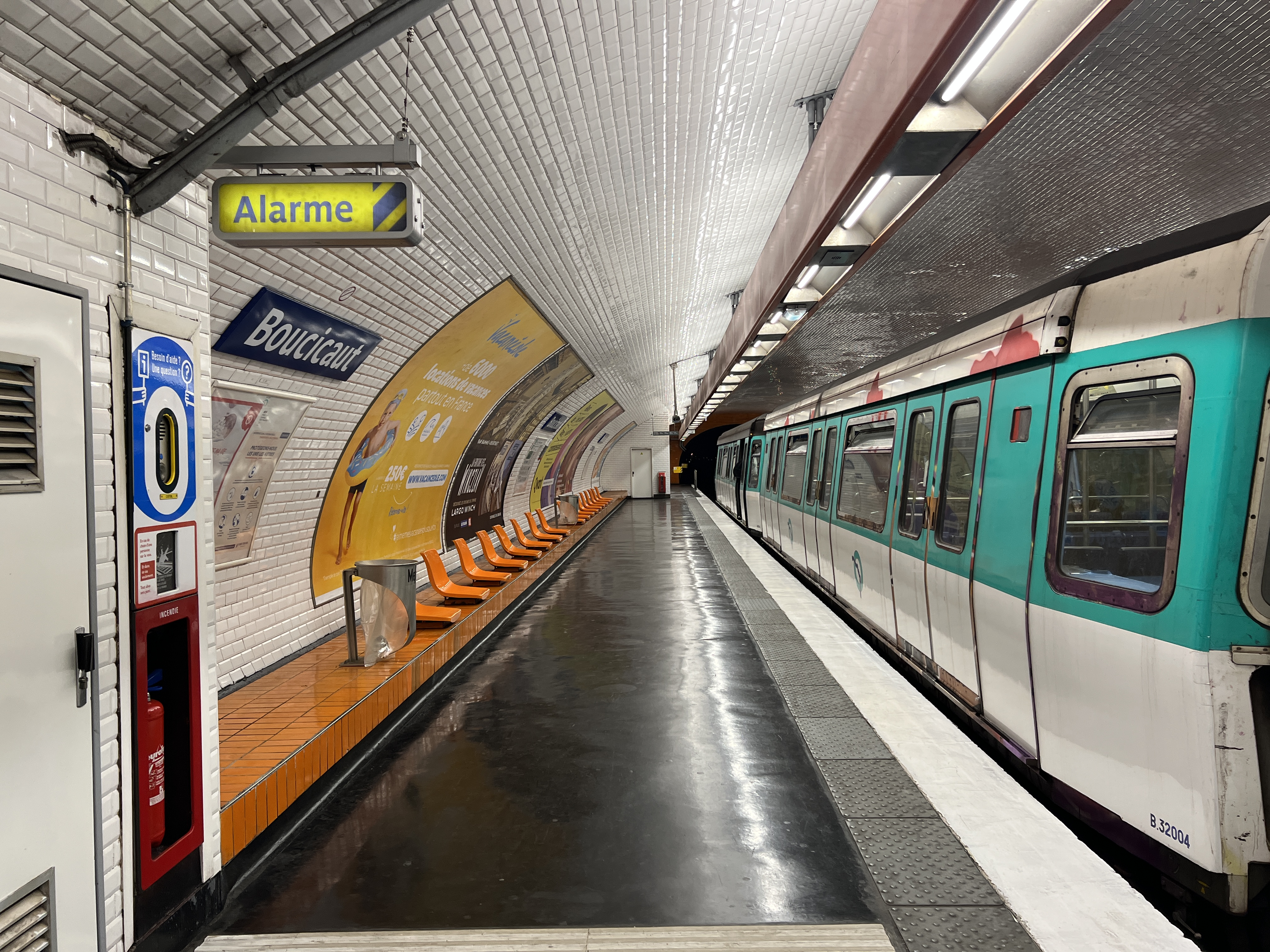
- MF 77 at Boucicaut

General information
- Location: 15th arrondissement of Paris; Île-de-France; France
- Coordinates: 48°50′26″N 2°17′12″E
- System: Paris Métro station
- Owner: RATP
- Operator: RATP
- Line: Paris Metro Paris Metro Line 8
- Platforms: 2 (side platforms)
- Tracks: 2

Construction
- Accessible: no

Other information
- Station code: 1611
- Fare zone: 1

History
- Opened: 27 July 1937

Passengers
- 2,288,055 (2021)

Services
Preceding station	Paris Metro	Following station
Lourmel towards Balard	Line 8	Félix Faure towards Pointe du Lac
Location
- Location within Paris

Boucicaut (French pronunciation: [busiko]) is a station on Line 8 of the Paris Métro in the 15th arrondissement.

It is named after the former Boucicaut Hospital (integrated into the Hôpital Européen Georges-Pompidou since 2000) and Rue Boucicaut (Rue Marguerite-Boucicaut since 2005), named after the philanthropic couple Marguerite (1816–1877) and Aristide Boucicaut (1810–1877), founders of the hospital.

It is the fourth of eight stations on the network to be named after a woman, after Barbès–Rochechouart (Lines 2 and 4), Madeleine (Lines 8, 12, and 14), and Chardon Lagache (Line 10). The remaining four stations are Louise Michel (Line 3), and more recently, Pierre et Marie Curie (Line 7), Barbara (Line 4), and Bagneux–Lucie Aubrac (Line 4 and the upcoming Line 15).

== History ==
The station opened on 27 July 1937 as part of the extension of line 8 from La Motte-Picquet - Grenelle to Balard.

As part of the "Un métro + beau" programme by the RATP, the station's corridors were renovated and modernised on 27 March 2007.

In 2019, the station was used by 3,152,108 passengers, making it the 162nd busiest of the Métro network out of 302 stations.

In 2020, the station was used by 1,734,347 passengers amidst the COVID-19 pandemic, making it the 141st busiest of the Métro network out of 304 stations.

In 2021, the station was used by 2,288,055 passengers, making it the 252nd busiest of the Métro network out of 304 stations.

The station was featured in Michel Houellebecq's poem, Station Boucicaut, in his collection, Renaissance.

== Passenger services ==
=== Access ===
The station has 5 accesses:

- Access 1: rue Sarasate
- Access 2: rue Henri-Bocquillon
- Access 3: rue de la Convention
- Access 4: avenue Félix-Faure
- Access 5: rue Duranton (with an ascending escalator)

=== Station layout ===
Street Level
B1	Mezzanine
Platform level	Side platform, doors will open on the right
Platform level	Westbound	← toward Balard (Lourmel)
Platform level	Eastbound	toward Pointe du Lac (Félix Faure) →
Platform level	Side platform, doors will open on the right

=== Platforms ===
The station is the last station on the line in the direction of Balard to have a standard configuration with 2 tracks surrounded by 2 side platforms.

=== Other connections ===
The station is also served by line 62 of the RATP bus network.

== Nearby ==
- Jardin Marguerite-Boucicaut
- Square Boucicaut
- Square Duranton

== Gallery ==
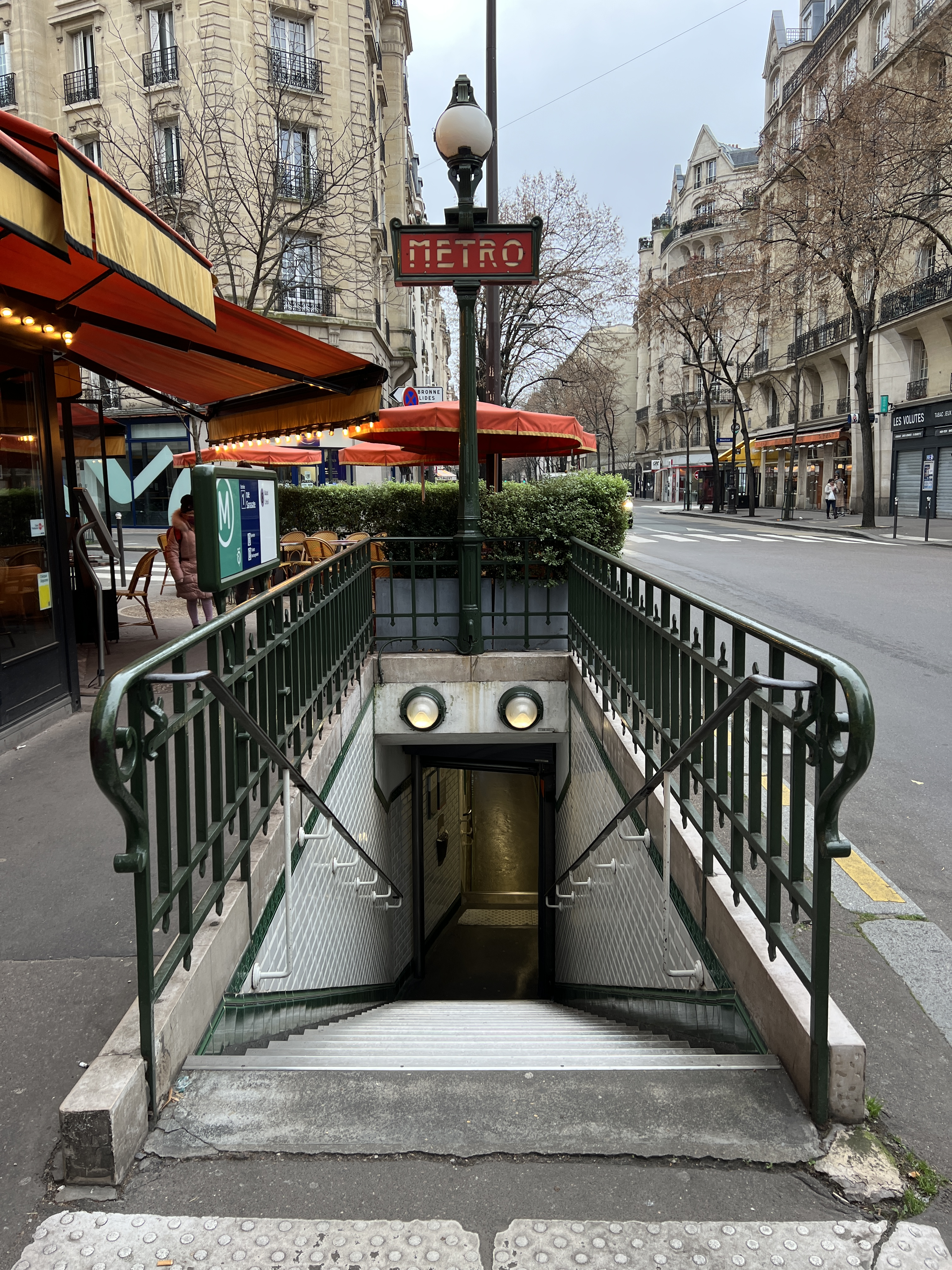
Access 1

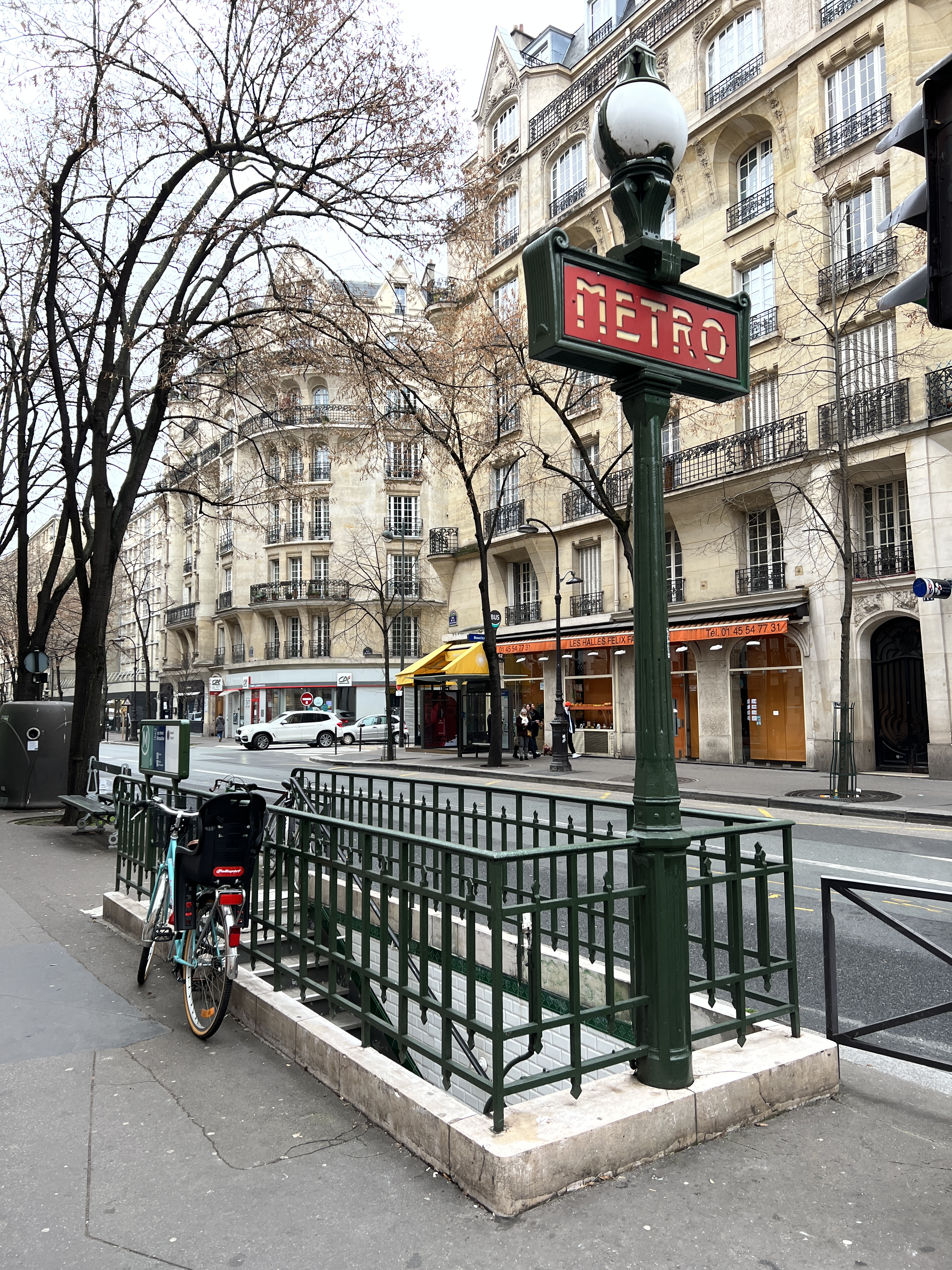
Access 2

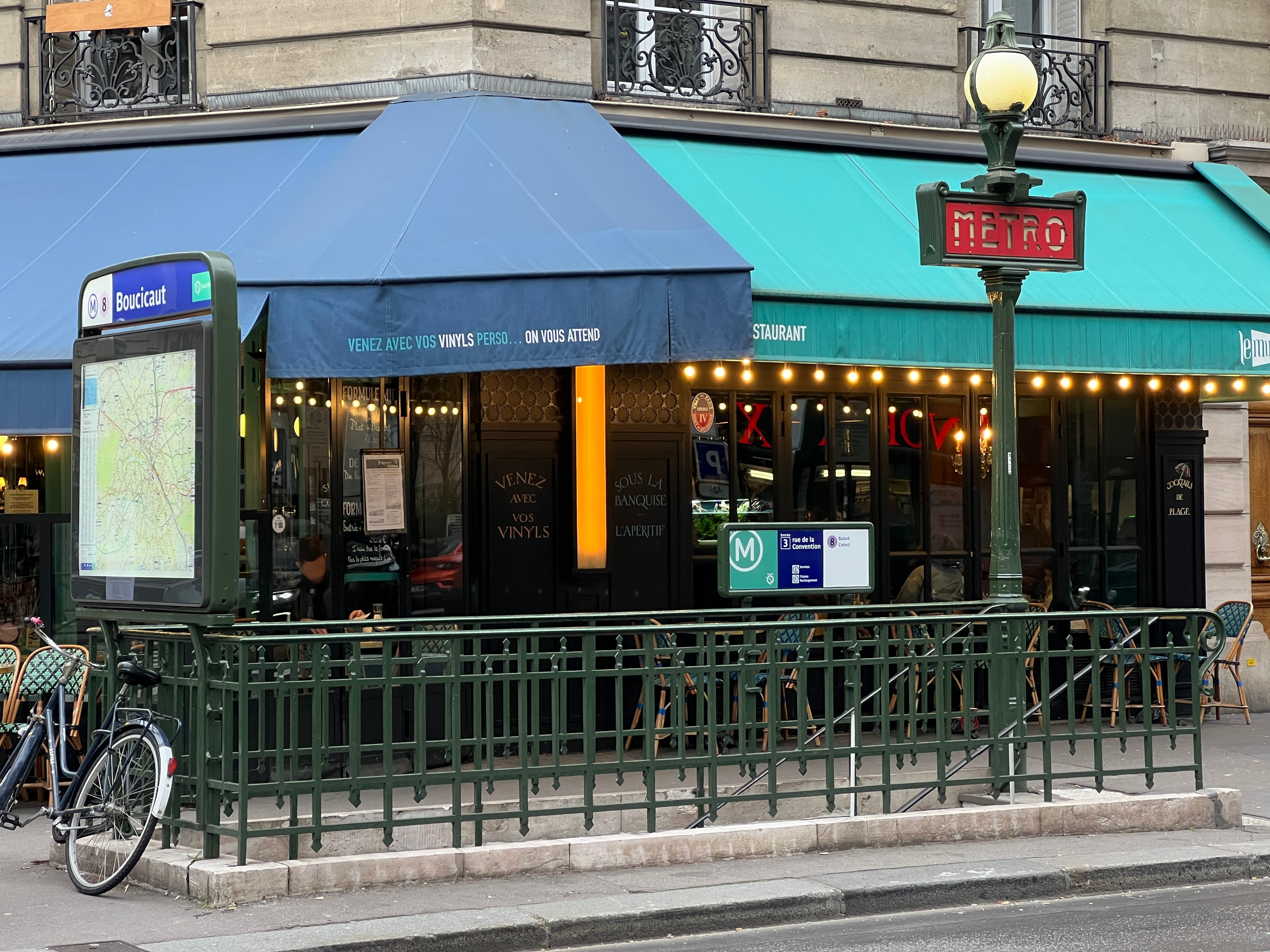
Access 3

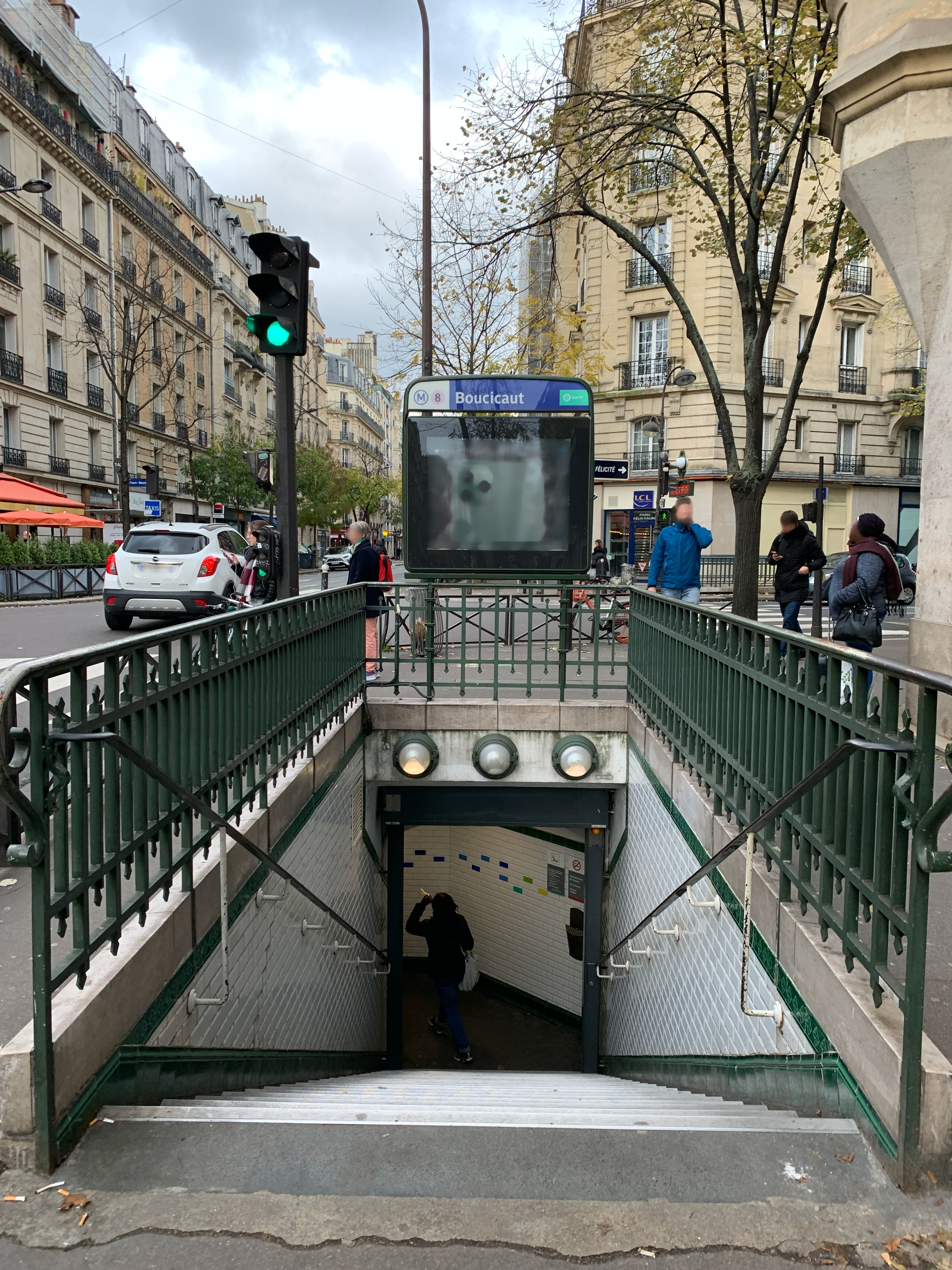
Access 4

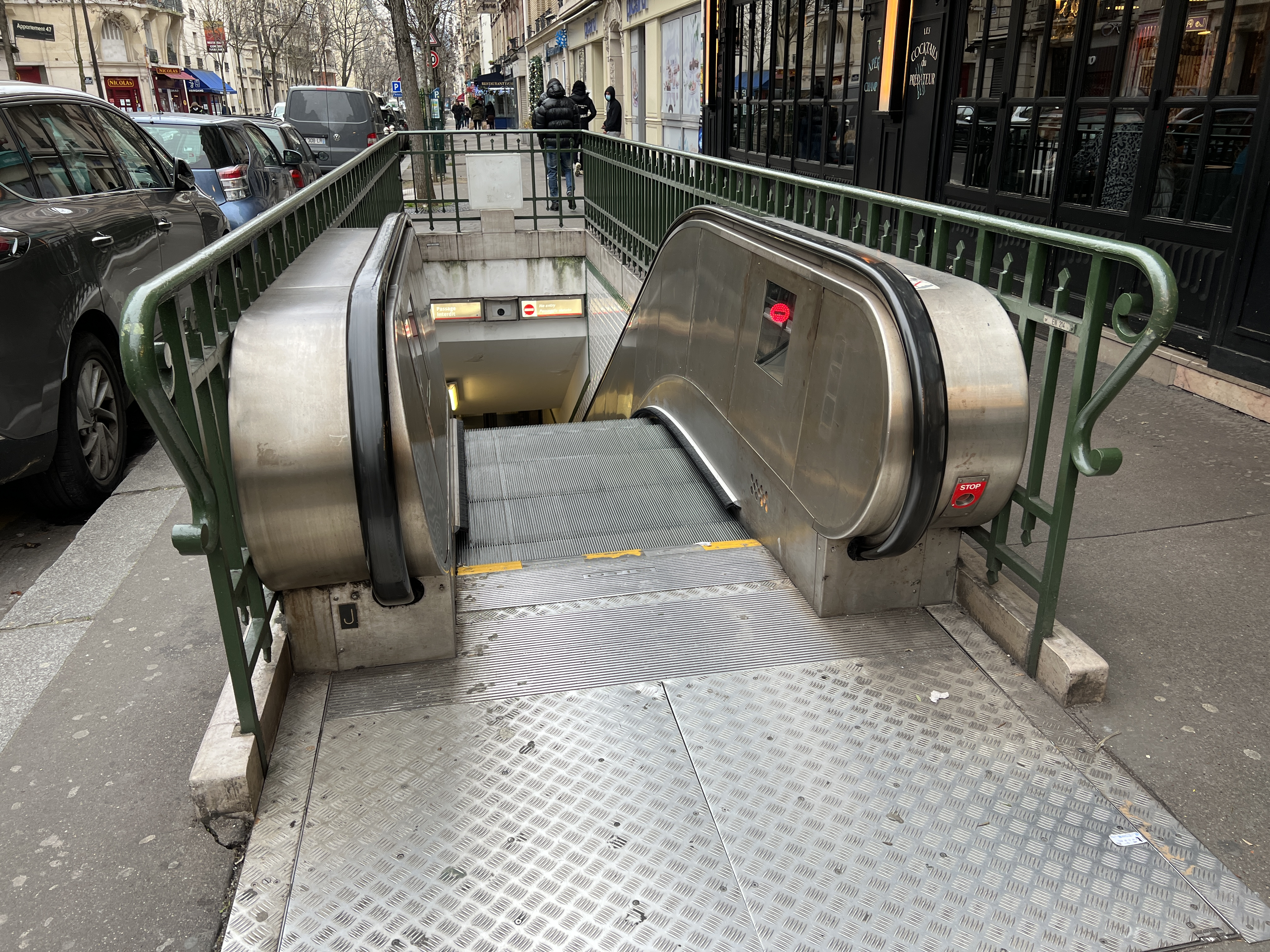
Access 5
