= Grand Pavois de Paris =

Real estate complex in Paris, France

Grand-pavois de Paris
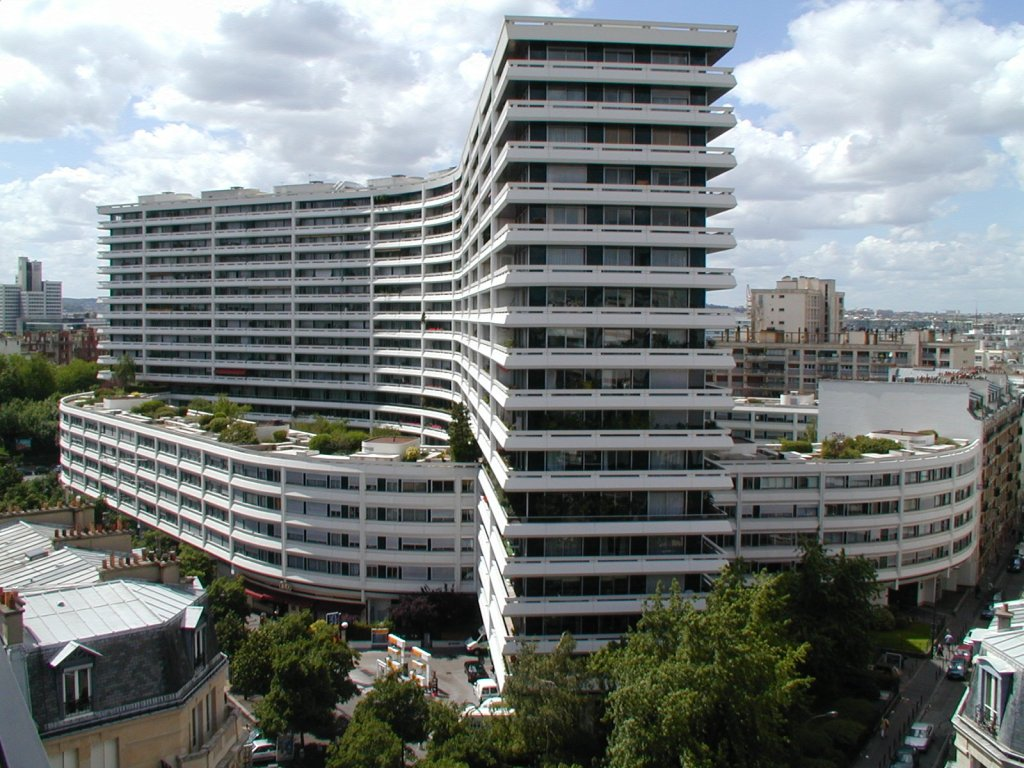
- The Grand Pavois seen from the angle Lecourbe / Vasco-de-Gama.
- Interactive map of the Grand-pavois de Paris area

General information
- Status: Completed
- Architectural style: Modernism
- Location: 354-362 Rue Lecourbe, 15th arrondissement of Paris
- Completed: 1971

Design and construction
- Architects: Jean Fayeton and Michel Herbert

The Grand Pavois de Paris is a vast real estate complex in Paris, France.

== Location and access ==
It is one of the largest real estate complexes in Paris, which occupies an entire block located between rue Vasco-de-Gama, Lourmel, Lecourbe and Leblanc, in the 15th arrondissement.

This site is served by the Lourmel and Balard metro stations on line 8 and Balard and Desnouettes tram stations on line 3.

== History and description ==
Built from 1969 to 1971 in two stages by architects Jean Fayeton (Jean-Louis Fayeton) and Michel Herbert for Cogedim, it consists of two buildings that intersect:

- one of four stories, roughly elliptical, interrupted only at the corner Vasco-de-Gama / Lourmel by older buildings,
- the other of 16 stories, shaped like a boomerang.

The building has several gardens:

- one central urban park
- several decorative gardens outside of the building.

The building also houses many shops (a supermarket, a sewing shop, a pharmacy, etc.), some of which are distributed by a shopping arcade on the ground floor, and many liberal professions. It also housed a homonymous movie theatre until 2007.

Most of the building is occupied by housing units, which number over 600. The south-eastern facade of the 16 stories building is entirely made up of balconies, also equipping the north and south gables. By its population and the variety of services offered, the Grand Pavois can be considered as a city on its own.

In 2021, the Grand Pavois is one of the three complexes having been the subject of a consultation within the framework of the “Buildings to share” project under the aegis of the Pavillon de l'Arsenal which is a prospective study of the transformation of the condominium regime in Paris.

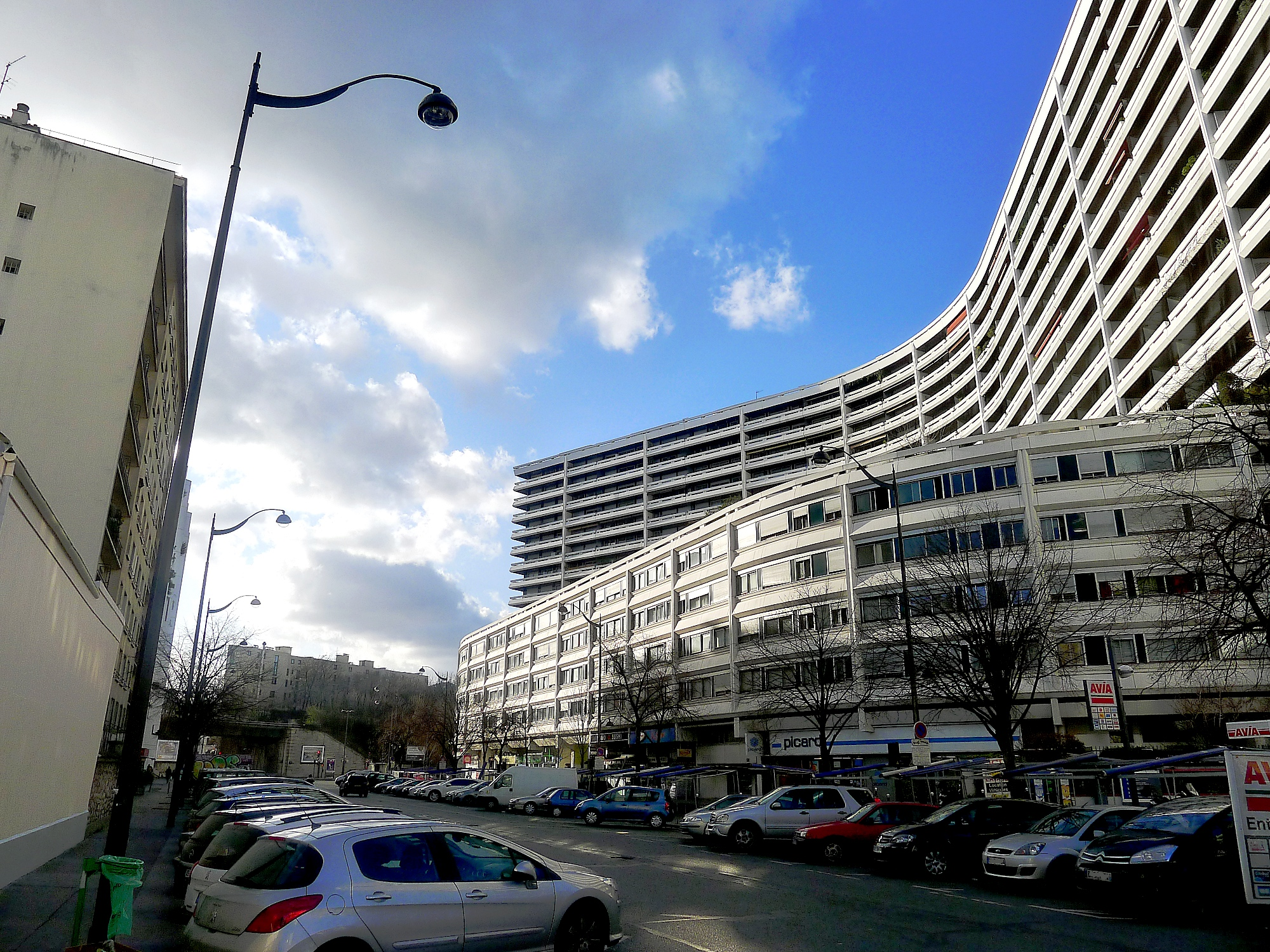
The Grand Pavois see from place Robert-Guillemard

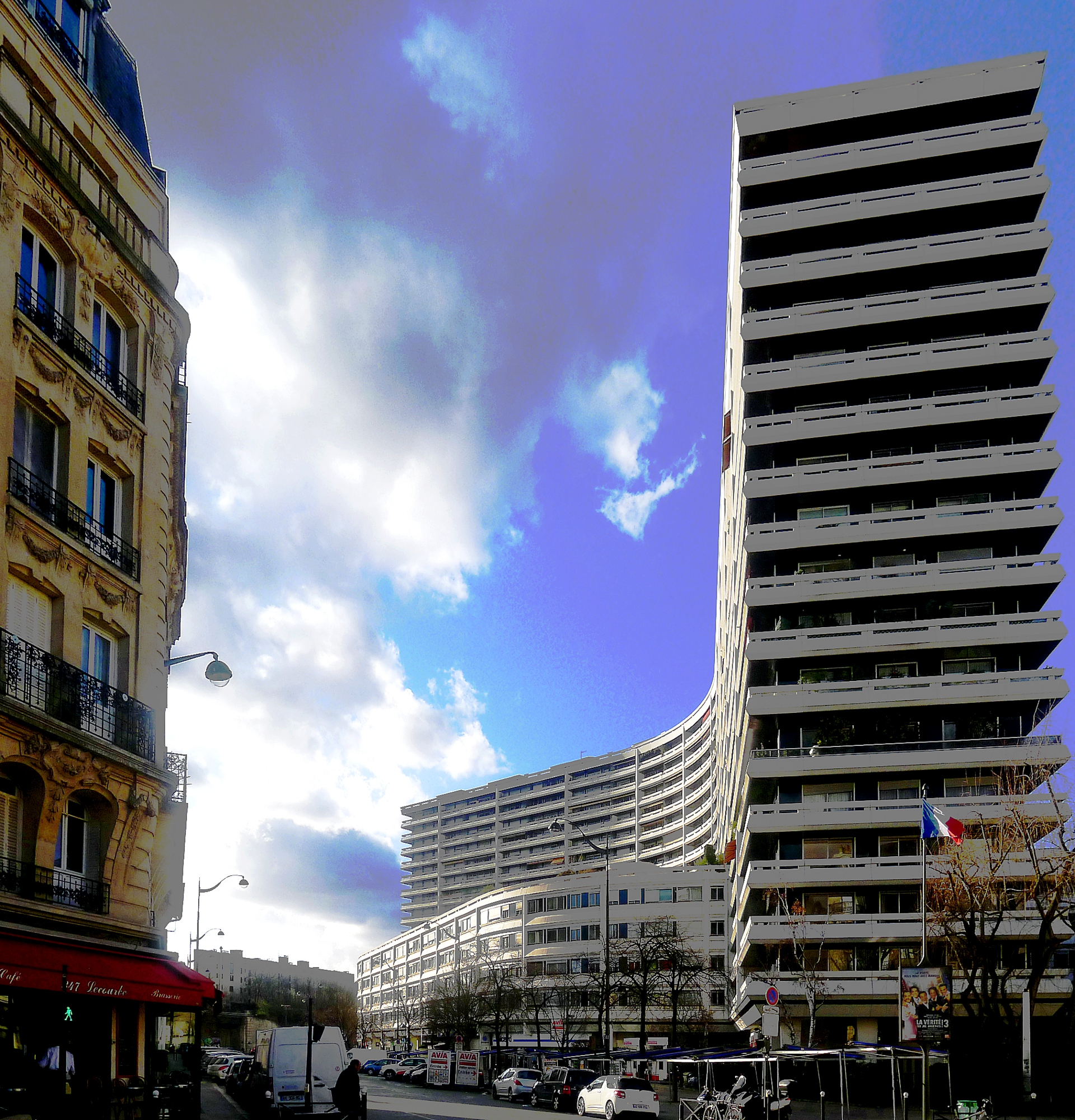
The Grand Pavois seen from rue Lecourbe

== Etymology ==
The name of the apartment complex comes from a French word related to navigation, "le pavois" is the part of a ship's hull that is above deck. The movie theatre, Le Grand Pavois, which closed in 2007, also named his projection rooms with names related to navigation : Bâbord (port side), Tribord (star board side), Vasco de Gama and Amirauté (Admiralty).
