= Félix Faure station =

Metro station in Paris, France

Félix Faure
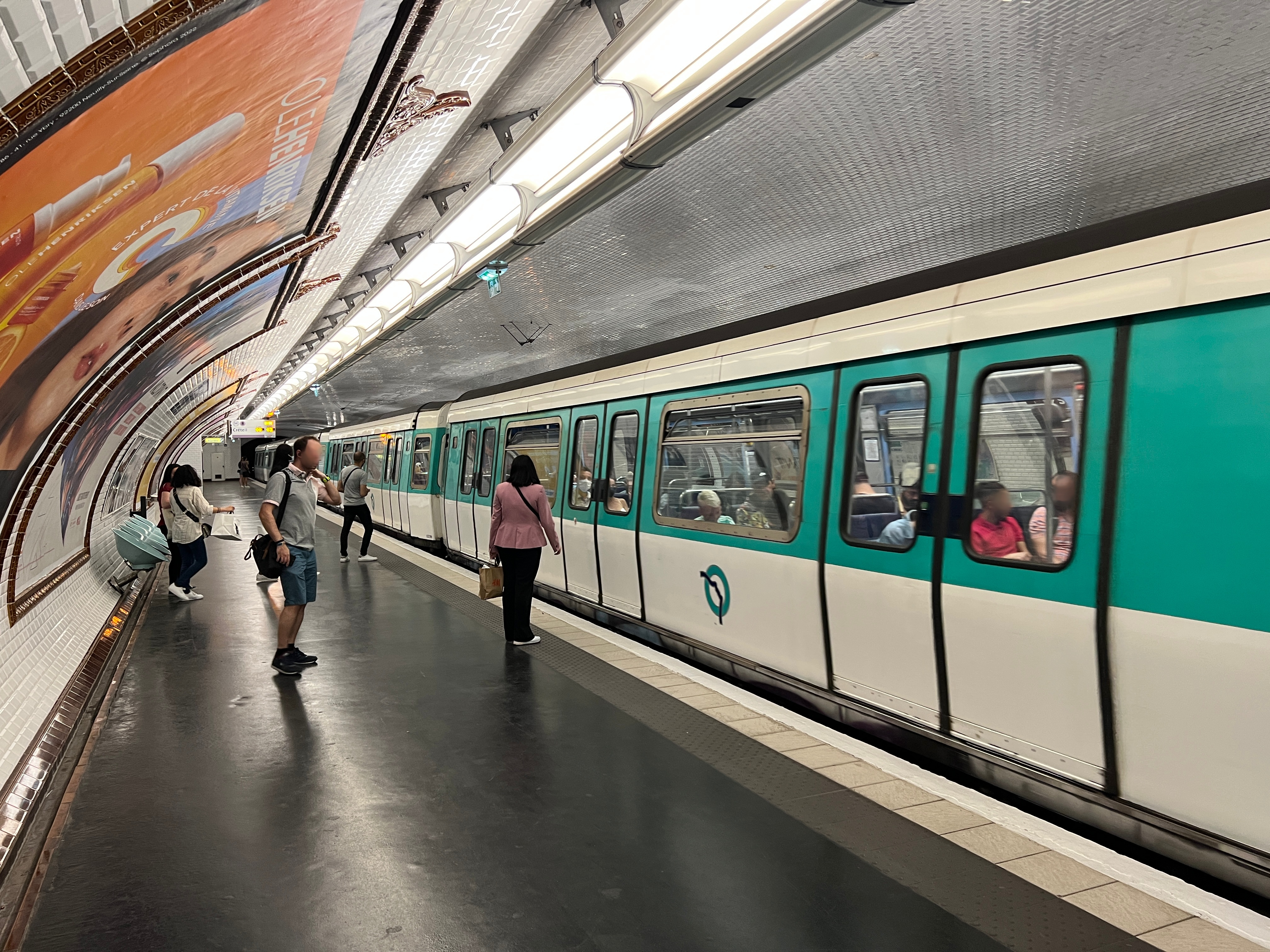
- MF 77 at Félix Faure

General information
- Location: 15th arrondissement of Paris; Île-de-France; France
- Coordinates: 48°50′32″N 2°17′28″E
- System: Paris Métro station
- Owner: RATP
- Operator: RATP
- Line: Paris Metro Paris Metro Line 8
- Platforms: 2 (side platforms)
- Tracks: 2

Construction
- Accessible: no

Other information
- Station code: 1612
- Fare zone: 1

History
- Opened: 27 July 1937

Passengers
- 1,161,978 (2021)

Services
Preceding station	Paris Metro	Following station
Boucicaut towards Balard	Line 8	Commerce towards Pointe du Lac
Location
- Location within Paris

Félix Faure (French pronunciation: [feliks fɔʁ]) is a station on Line 8 of the Paris Métro in the 15th arrondissement.

It is named after the nearby Avenue Félix-Faure, which is in turn named after Félix Faure (1841–1899), the President of France from 1895 to 1899. It is the first of three stations on the network that were named after a President of France; the other two being Charles de Gaulle–Étoile on Lines 1, 2 and 6, and Bibliothèque François Mitterrand on Line 14.

== History ==
The station opened on 27 July 1937 as part of the extension of line 8 from La Motte-Picquet - Grenelle to Balard.

In 2019, the station was used by 1,744,774 passengers, making it the 263rd busiest of the Métro network out of 302 stations.

In 2020, the station was used by 776,924 passengers amidst the COVID-19 pandemic, making it the 270th busiest of the Métro network out of 304 stations.

In 2021, the station was used by 1,161,978 passengers, making it the 265th busiest of the Métro network out of 304 stations.

== Passenger services ==
=== Access ===
The station has 3 accesses:

- Access 1: rue des Frères Morane
- Access 2: Place Étienne Pernet
- Access 3: avenue Félix Faure

=== Station layout ===
Street Level
B1	Mezzanine
Platform level	Side platform, doors will open on the right
Platform level	Westbound	← toward Balard (Boucicaut)
Platform level	Eastbound	toward Pointe du Lac (Commerce) →
Platform level	Side platform, doors will open on the right

=== Platforms ===
The station has a standard configuration with 2 tracks surrounded by 2 side platforms.

=== Other connections ===
The station is also served by lines 70 and 88 of the RATP bus network as well as the Traverse Brancion-Commerce, an electric bus operated by BE Green from parc Georges Brassens to the Pasteur Institute.

== Nearby ==
- Église Saint-Jean-Baptiste de Grenelle
- Square Saint-Lambert
- Square Violet

== Gallery ==
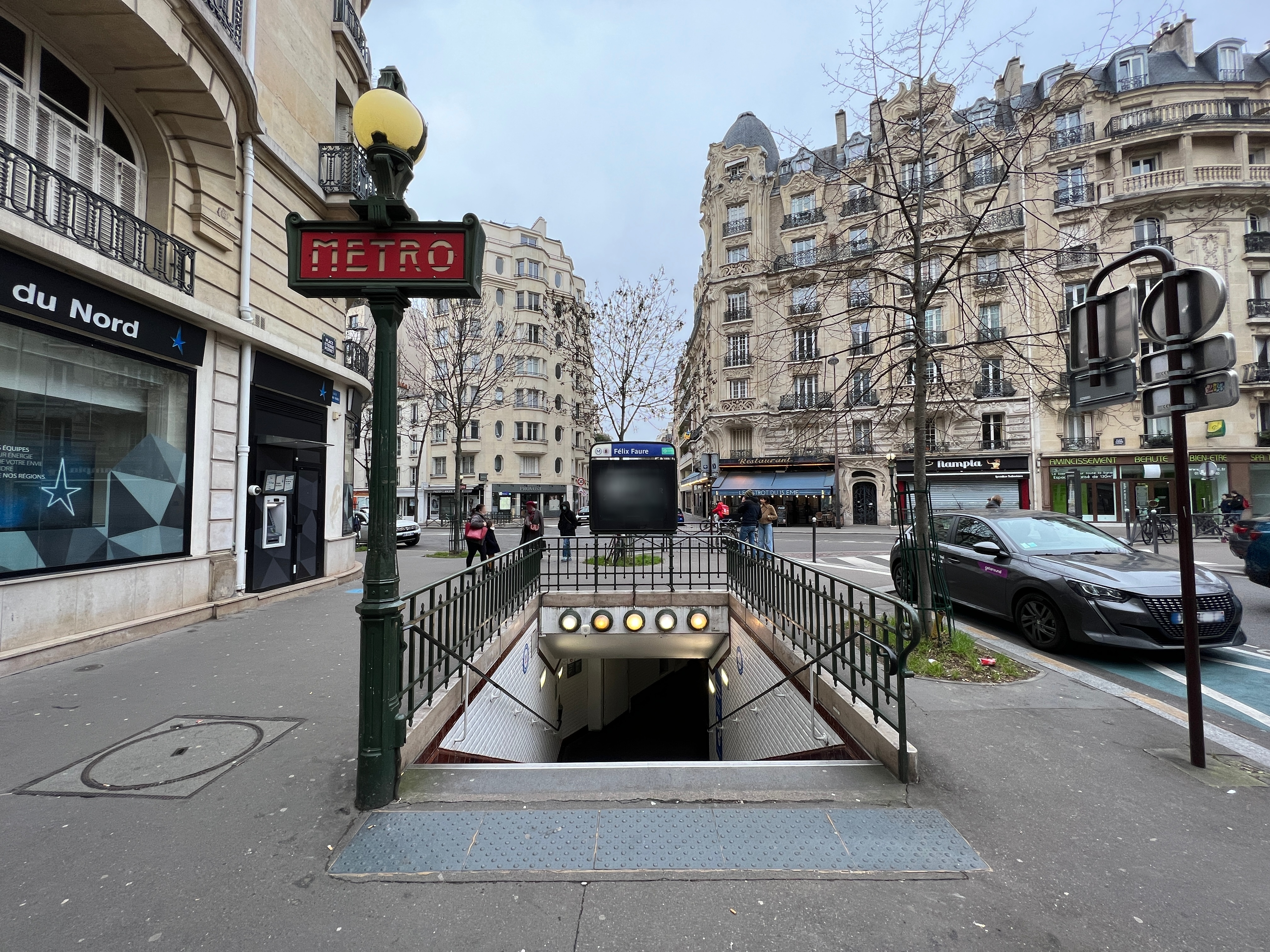
Access 1

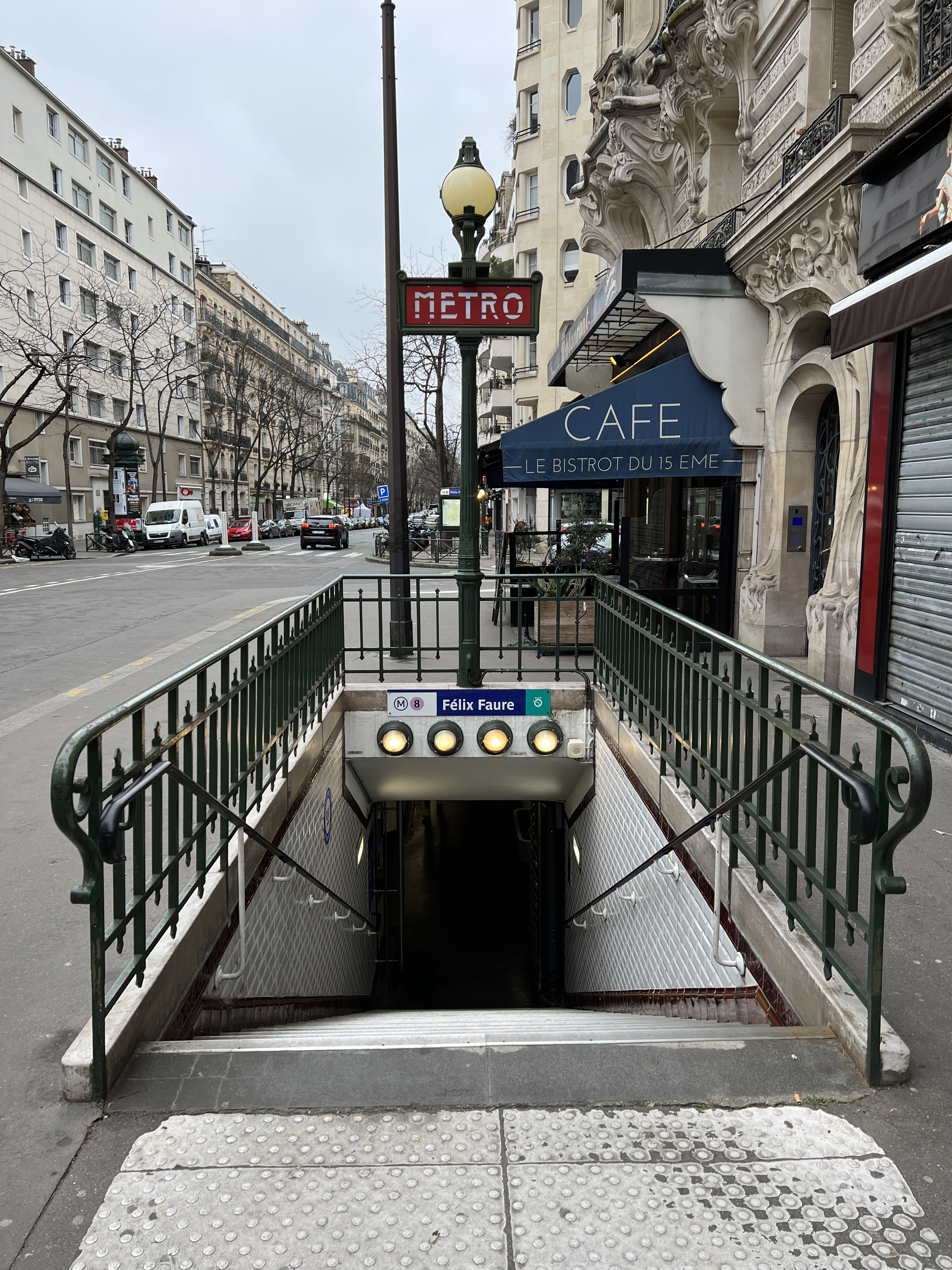
Access 2

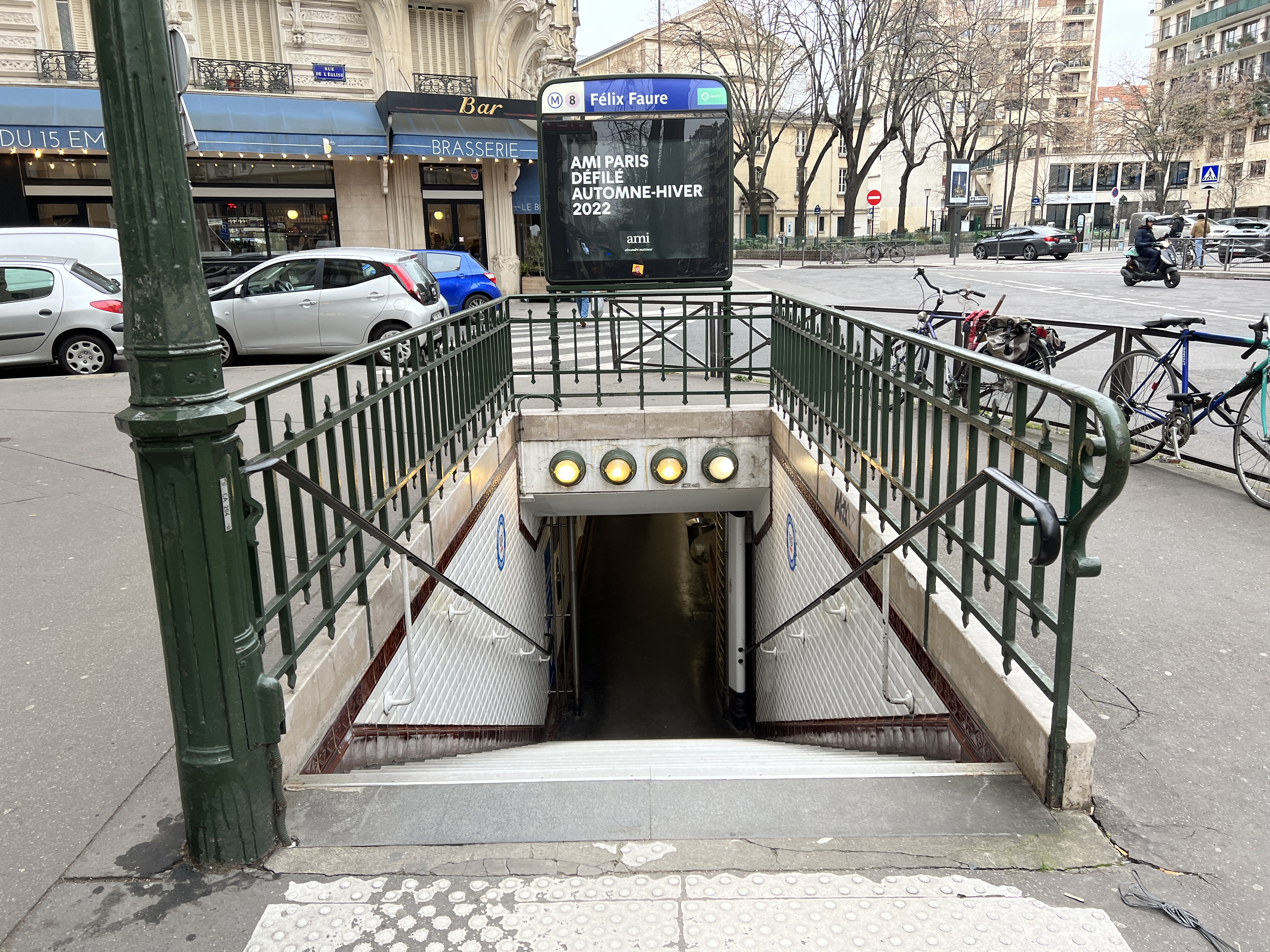
Access 3
