= Lourmel station =

Metro station in Paris, France

Lourmel
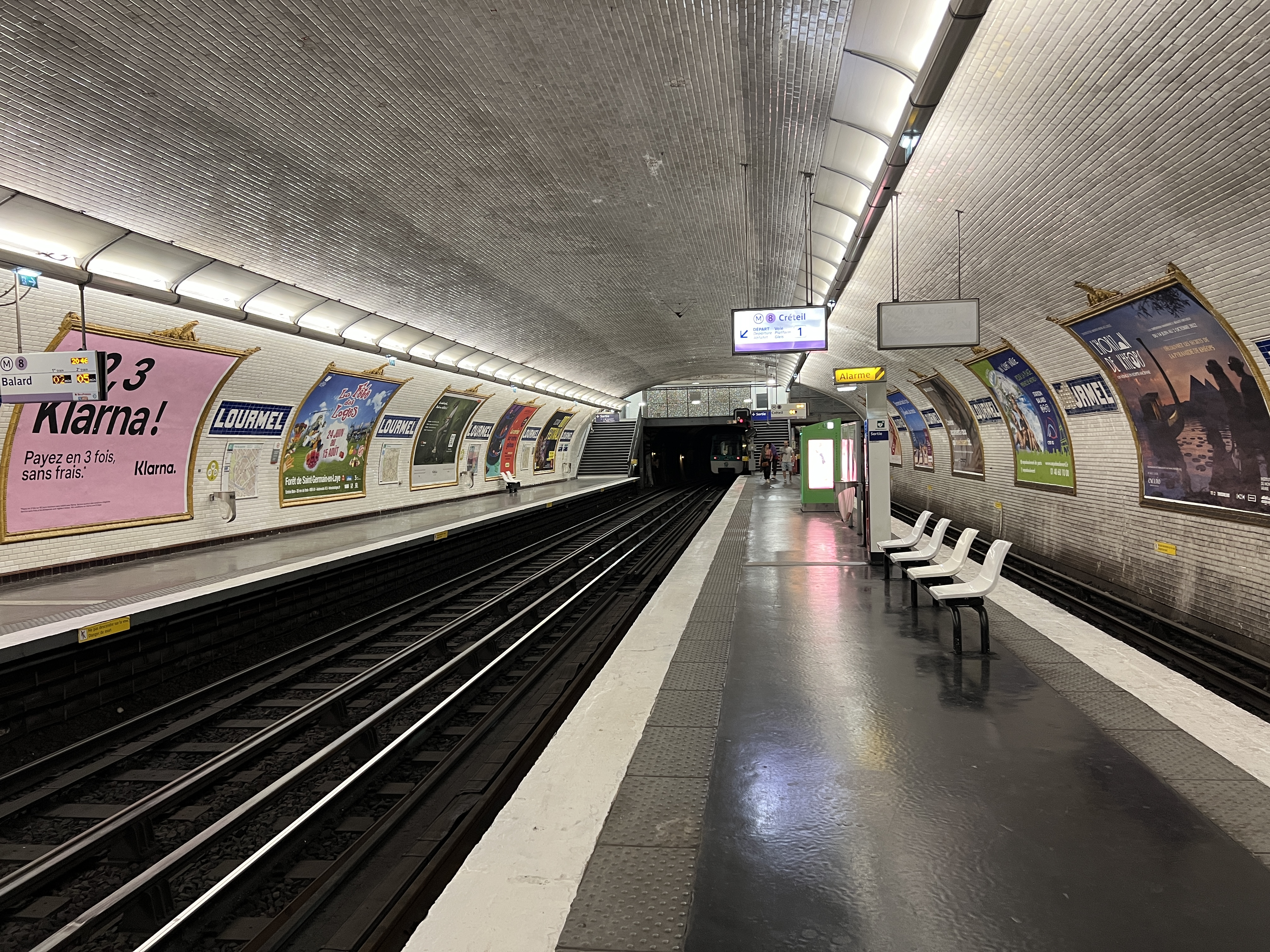
- Platforms

General information
- Location: 15th arrondissement of Paris; Île-de-France; France
- Coordinates: 48°50′19″N 2°16′55″E
- System: Paris Métro station
- Owner: RATP
- Operator: RATP
- Line: Paris Metro Paris Metro Line 8
- Platforms: 2 (1 island platform, 1 side platform)
- Tracks: 3

Construction
- Accessible: no

Other information
- Fare zone: 1

History
- Opened: 27 July 1937

Services
Preceding station	Paris Metro	Following station
Balard Terminus	Line 8	Boucicaut towards Pointe du Lac
Location
- Location within Paris

Lourmel (French pronunciation: [luʁmɛl]) is a station on Line 8 of the Paris Métro in the 15th arrondissement. It is named after the nearby Rue de Lourmel, which in turn is named after General Frédéric Henri Le Normand de Lourmel (1811–1854), who was killed at the Battle of Inkerman where the Franco-British armies defeated the Russian armies under Alexander Sergeyevich Menshikov during the Crimean War.

== History ==
The station opened on 27 July 1937 as part of the extension of line 8 from La Motte-Picquet - Grenelle to Balard.

As part of the "Un métro + beau" programme by the RATP, the station's corridors and platform lighting were renovated and modernised on 13 November 2003.

In 2019, the station was used by 2,301,922 passengers, making it the 226th busiest of the Métro network out of 302 stations.

In 2020, the station was used by 1,120,497 passengers amidst the COVID-19 pandemic, making it the 231st busiest of the Métro network out of 304 stations.

In 2021, the station was used by 1,696,432 passengers, making it the 210th busiest of the Métro network out of 304 stations.

== Passenger services ==
=== Access ===
The station has 2 accesses:

- Access 1: rue de Lourmel
- Access 2: rue Vasco-de-Gama (with an ascending escalator)

=== Station layout ===
Street Level
B1	Mezzanine
Platform level	Side platform, doors will open on the right
Platform level	Westbound	← toward Balard (Terminus)
Platform level	Eastbound	toward Pointe du Lac (Boucicaut) →
Platform level	Island platform, doors will open on the right
Platform level	Yard track	No regular service

=== Platforms ===
It has 3 tracks divided amongst 1 island platform and 1 side platform. Trains towards Balard utilise the northern track (the side platform) while trains towards Pointe du Lac use the central track. The yard track is not used in revenue service and is normally used to park trains. It also has access to the Javel workshops (a maintenance centre) for trains to be removed from service (on the tracks towards Boucicaut) or for routine maintenance. The yard track leads to a dead end on the side towards Balard. The workshops contain a washing machine where trains from line 8 are regularly washed: a machine wash once a week and a manual wash once a month (including the interiors). It has several features that help reduce water consumption as part of the RATP's sustainable development policy such as the ability to use groundwater in addition to tap water for washing.

=== Other connections ===
The station is also served by line 42 of the RATP bus network.

== Nearby ==
- Grenelle cemetery
- Jardin Caroline-Aigle
- Parc André Citroën
- Square Jean-Cocteau
- Square Rosalind-Franklin
- Vaugirard Cemetery

== Gallery ==
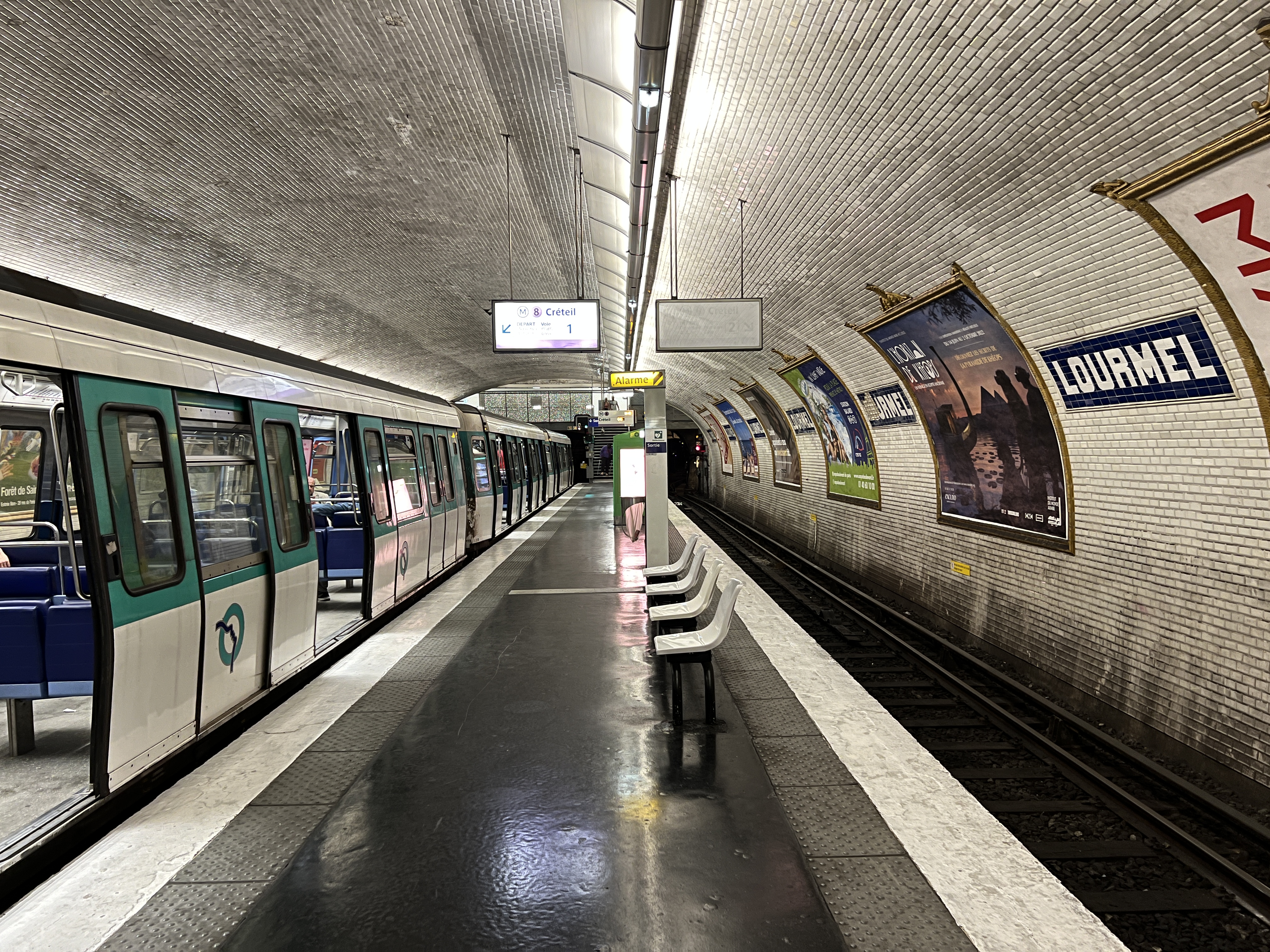
MF 77 at Lourmel

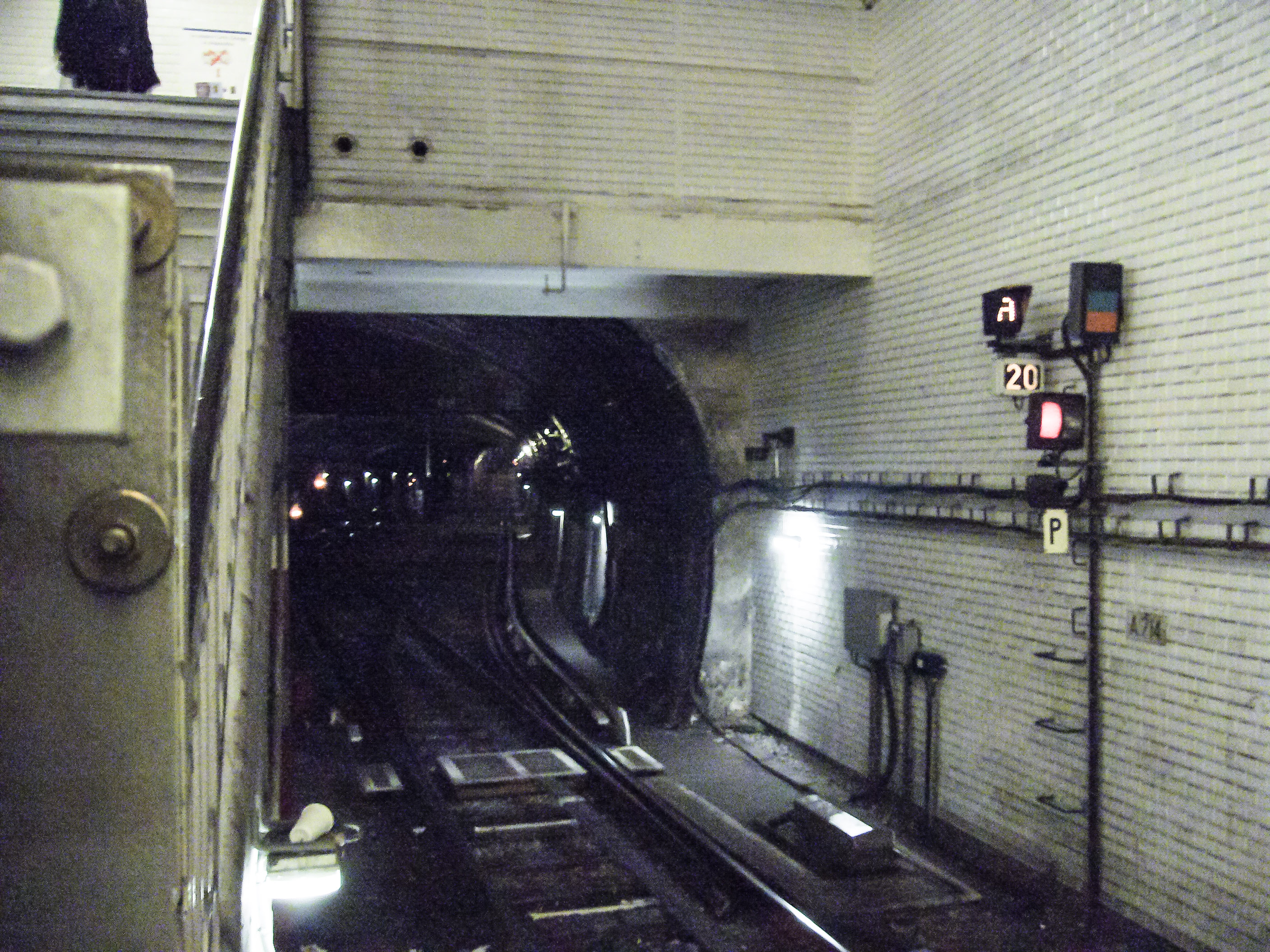
Tracks switches leading to the Javel workshops from the yard track

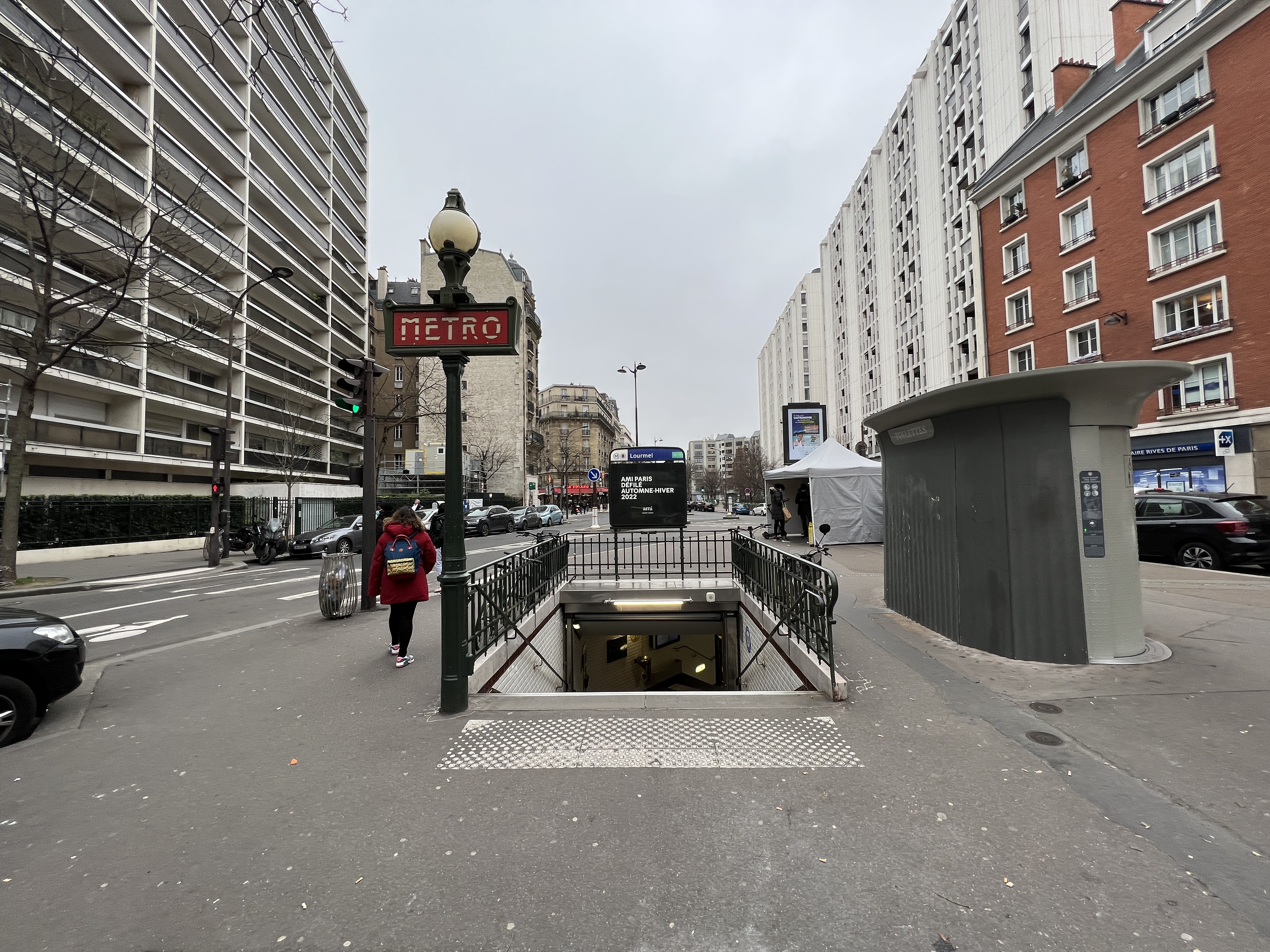
Access 1

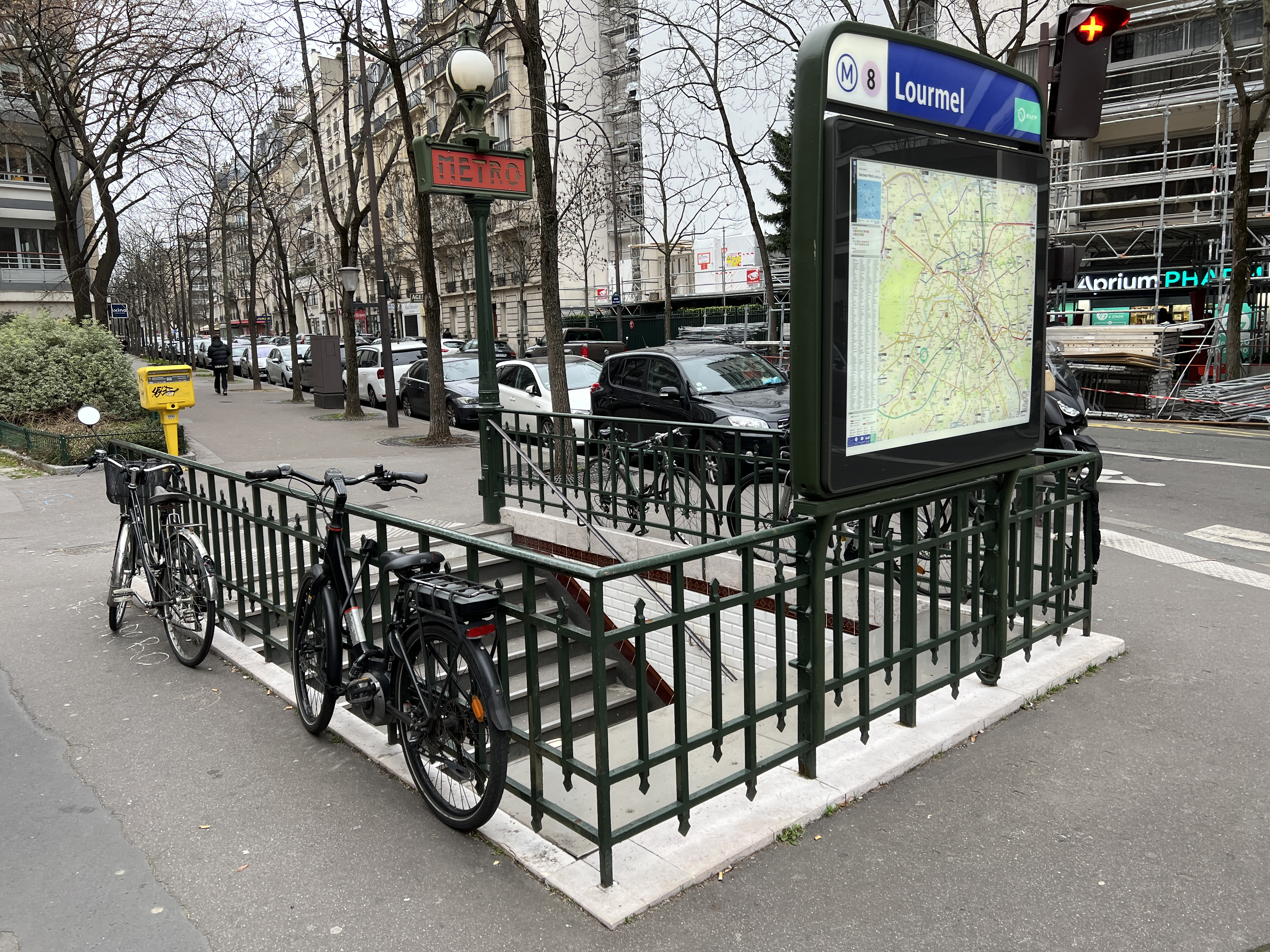
Another view of access 1

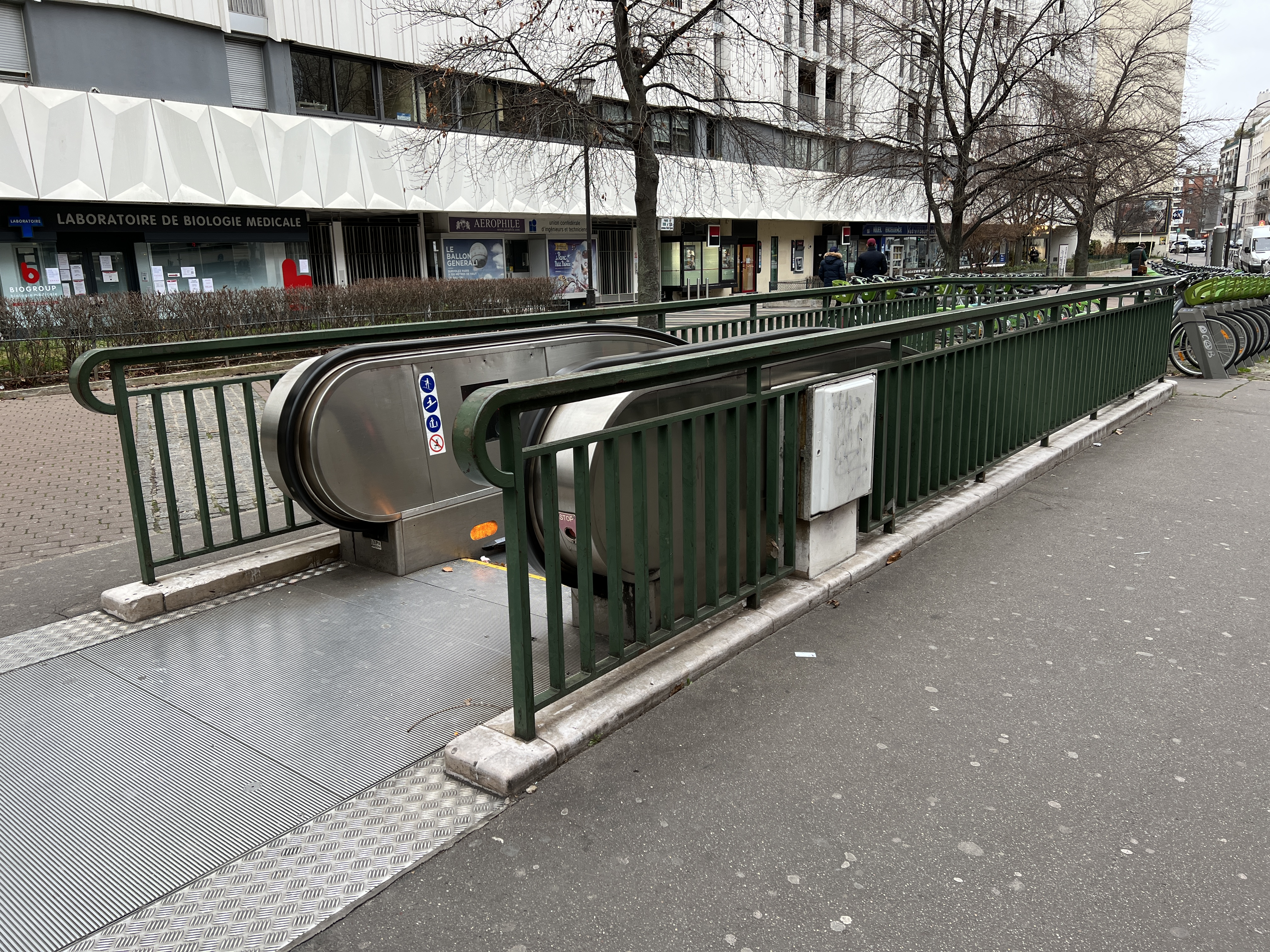
Access 2
