= Compagnons de Jeanne d'Arc =

The Compagnons de Jeanne d'Arc (Companions of Joan of Arc) was an association honouring Saint Joan of Arc. From 1937 to 1939, it organised mass patriotic and religious demonstrations at Domrémy in her honour.

== Demonstrations ==
=== 9 May 1937 ===
This demonstration was organised by the Amis du berceau de Jeanne d'Arc with the aid of the Compagnons de Jeanne d'Arc. Fifty parliamentary deputies took part, of whom 21 belonged to the URD group in the Chamber of Deputies (including Louis Marin, François Valentin, Xavier Vallat and Philippe Henriot). Twenty thousand people were in attendance. The ceremony included a Mass with a sermon by the Bishop of Saint-Dié-des-Vosges and addresses by Louis Madelin, Charles Berlet and senator Charles Reibel.

=== 1 May 1938 ===
The rally was organised jointly by the two associations. Marcel Boucher obtained the support of the government and the presence of the army, represented by a military band and the commandant of the 20th Corps. The demonstration was larger, but it remained linked to the Catholic Church. The church, Action catholique and Catholic periodicals in Lorraine gave their support. The Mass was celebrated by Cardinal Jean Verdier and two bishops. The crowd heard addresses by Louis Marin, Marcel Boucher, Maxime Real del Sarte and Marshal Louis Franchet d'Espèrey. The parliamentary deputies who were present were from the centre-right (or right) of the Chamber.

=== 4 June 1939 ===
This rally benefited from the attention brought by the visit to Lorraine of Cardinal legate Villeneuve and a number of bishops. Tens of thousands of people attended the open-air Mass in front of the new basilica, the procession and addresses by Maxime Real del Sarte, Marcel Boucher and General Maxime Weygand. Parliamentary deputies present were from the centre-right or the right.

Minister Auguste Champetier de Ribes (Minister of War Veterans and Pensions and a Catholic member of the Parti démocrate populaire) and the Vosges prefect were present. In addition, the highest authorities of the Republic were part of the association's honorary committee. (Note: The honorary committee included the president of the Republic, Albert Lebrun, the president of the Chamber of Deputies, Herriot, the presidents of the council Daladier, Camille Chautemps, Tardieu, Pierre Laval and Pierre-Étienne Flandin, marshals Pétain and Franchet d'Espérey, generals Maxime Weygand, Édouard de Castelnau and Henri Gouraud. Daladier gave his support during the Munich Crisis at the request of Marcel Boucher. Most of the parliamentarians from Lorraine was also part of the honorary committee, including Marc Rucart and Gaston Thiébaut, Radical Socialist deputies for Verdun, and three cardinals, Verdier, archbishop of Paris, Emmanuel Suhard, archbishop of Reims, and Alfred Baudrillart, rector of the Catholic Institute.)

Since 1938, a municipal order prohibited the sale or distribution of newspapers and the sale or carrying of political signs in the commune during the rally, since the Parti social français had taken advantage of the occasion in 1937 to distribute its newspaper.
