= Louis Madelin =

French historian (1871–1956)

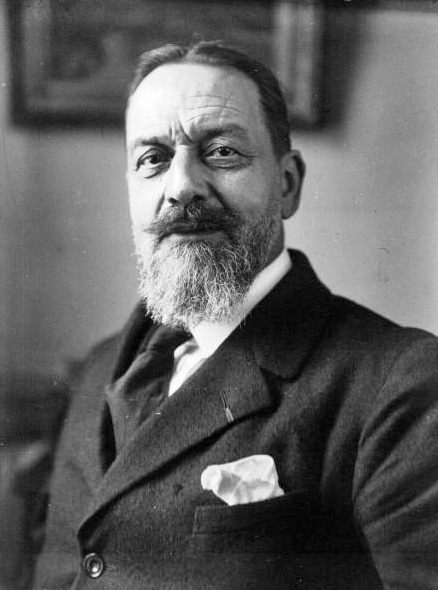
Louis Madelin in 1927

Louis Emile Marie Madelin (8 May 1871 – 18 August 1956) was a French historian (specialising in the French Revolution and First French Empire) and a Republican Federation deputy for Vosges from 1924 to 1928. He is buried at the Cimetière de Grenelle.

== Biography ==
Madelin was born in Neufchâteau (Vosges). Studying history at the École des chartes, he became a member of the École française de Rome then a professor at the faculté des lettres de Paris. He married in 1898, having four children by his first wife and on her death remarrying in 1909 to Marthe Clavery. During the First World War he was conscripted in 1914, becoming a sous-lieutenant and information officer before being demobbed in 1918 and receiving the Croix de guerre.

Elected to the Académie française in 1927 (replacing Robert de Flers in seat 5), in Lorraine he became president of the Association des Amis du berceau de Jeanne d'Arc on the death of Lyautey - the Association organised mass demonstrations in Domrémy from 1937 to 1939 under the aegis of the Compagnons de Jeanne d'Arc. In 1948 he participated in the creation of the Comité pour la Libération du Maréchal Pétain.

== Works ==
- 1901 De conventu Bononiensis
- 1901 Fouché
- 1905 Croquis lorrains
- 1906 La Rome de Napoléon
- 1906 Le général Lasalle
- 1911 La Révolution
- 1913 La France et Rome
- 1914 Danton
- 1916 La victoire de la Marne
- 1916 L'aveu, la bataille de Verdun et l'opinion allemande
- 1917 La mêlée des Flandres, l'Yser et Ypres
- 1918 L'expansion française de la Syrie au Rhin
- 1919 Les heures merveilleuses d'Alsace et de Lorraine
- 1920 Verdun. La bataille de France.
- 1921 Le chemin de la victoire, 2 vol
- 1922 La France du Directoire
- 1925 La colline de Chaillot
- 1925 Le maréchal Foch
- 1926 La France de l'Empire
- 1928 Les hommes de la Révolution
- 1929 Le Consulat de Bonaparte
- 1931 La Fronde
- 1932 Le Consulat et l'Empire, 2 vol
- 1933 Les grandes étapes de l'Histoire de France
- 1935 Lettres inédites de Napoléon à l'impératrice Marie-Louise, écrites de 1810 à 1814. Napoléon. La Contre-Révolution sous la Révolution
- 1936 Le crépuscule de la monarchie
- 1937 François Ier, le souverain politique
- 1937-1953 Histoire du Consulat et de l'Empire, 16 vol.
- 1944 Talleyrand
- 1945 Édition des Mémoires de Fouché.
