= Antoine Jérôme Balard =

French chemist

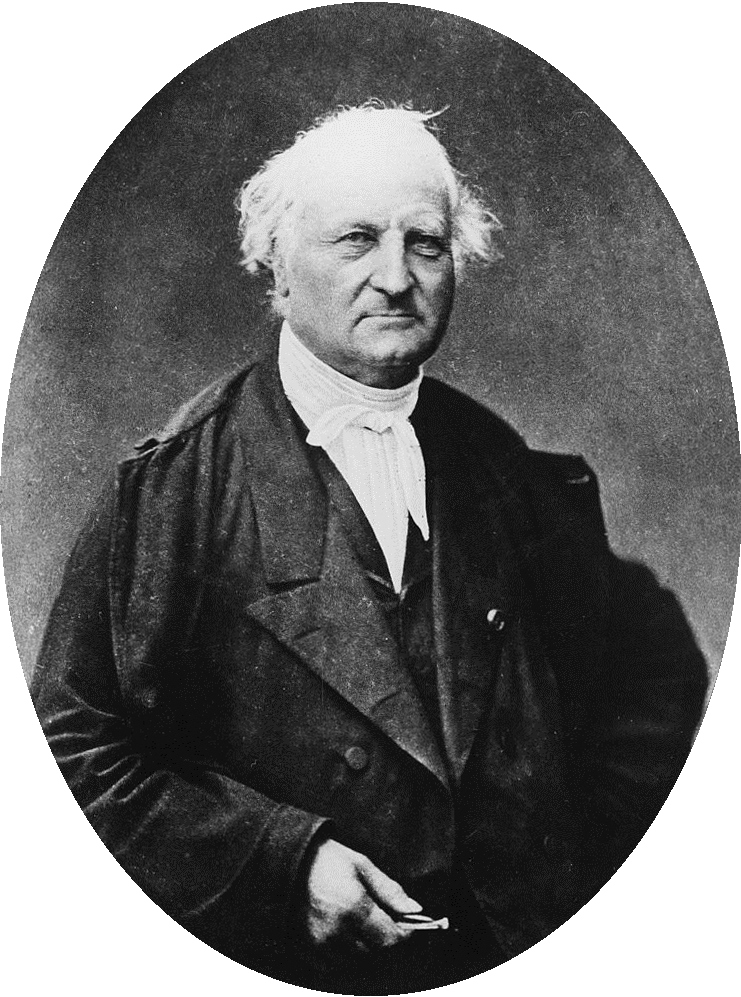
- Balard in the 1870s
- Born: 30 September 1802; Montpellier, France
- Died: 30 April 1876 (aged 73); Paris, France
- Education: École de pharmacie de Montpellier
- Known for: Discovery of bromine
- Spouse: Sophie-Elisabeth Pascal (m. 1838; died 1875)
- Awards: Royal Medal (1830)
- Scientific career
- Fields: Chemistry
- Workplaces: University of Paris; Collège de France

Antoine Jérôme Balard (French pronunciation: [ɑ̃twan ʒeʁom balaʁ]; 30 September 1802 – 30 April 1876) was a French chemist and one of the discoverers of bromine.

== Career ==
Born at Montpellier, France, on 30 September 1802, he started as an apothecary, but taking up teaching he acted as chemical assistant at the faculty of sciences of his native town, and then became professor of chemistry at the royal college and school of pharmacy and at the faculty of sciences. In 1826 he discovered in seawater a substance which he recognized as a previously unknown element and named it bromine. It had been independently prepared by Carl Jacob Löwig the previous year and the two are both regarded as having discovered the element.

This achievement brought him the reputation that secured his election as successor to Louis Jacques Thénard in the chair of chemistry at the faculty of sciences in Paris, and in 1851 he was appointed professor of chemistry at the College de France, where he had Marcellin Berthelot first as pupil, then as assistant and finally as colleague. Balard also had Louis Pasteur as a pupil when Pasteur was only 26 years old. It was in Balard's laboratory that Pasteur discovered the difference between "right-handed" and "left-handed" crystals while he was working with tartaric acid. Balard died in Paris on 30 April 1876.

While the discovery of bromine and the preparation of many of its compounds was his most conspicuous piece of work, Balard was an industrious chemist on both the pure and applied sides. In his researches on the bleaching compounds of chlorine he was the first to advance the view that bleaching-powder is a double compound of calcium chloride and hypochlorite; and he devoted much time to the problem of economically obtaining soda and potash from seawater, though here his efforts were nullified by the discovery of the much richer sources of supply afforded by the Stassfurt deposits. In organic chemistry he published papers on the decomposition of ammonium oxalate, with formation of oxamic acid, on amyl alcohol, on the cyanides, and on the difference in constitution between ethyl nitrate and ethyl sulfate. He also helped Louis Pasteur devise the experiment that would prove spontaneous generation to be false.

== Botany and John Stuart Mill ==
Antoine Jérôme Balard met John Stuart Mill while Mill was studying at the Montpellier Faculty of Sciences in the Winter of 1820. In Mill's journal of the period he writes of visiting Balard at his home, being shown his herbarium and receiving from him a selection of his plants from the Montpellier area, in addition to other accounts of the two embarking on daytrips around the city of Montpellier and to the sea to look for coastal plants. In a later letter to Auguste Comte, Mill describes Balard as his first real friend. A ‘friend of my own choice as opposed to those given to me by family ties’. A portion of John Stuart Mill's Herbarium, believed to be in the vicinity of 4000 specimens, is housed at the National Herbarium of Victoria (MEL) and within the Mill Herbarium are contained these Balard collections, mainly from the area of Montpellier.

== Commemoration ==
Balard is commemorated in the name of Balard station on the Paris Metro.
