= Grenelle cemetery =

Cemetery in Paris, France

Coordinates: 48°50′29″N 2°16′47″E

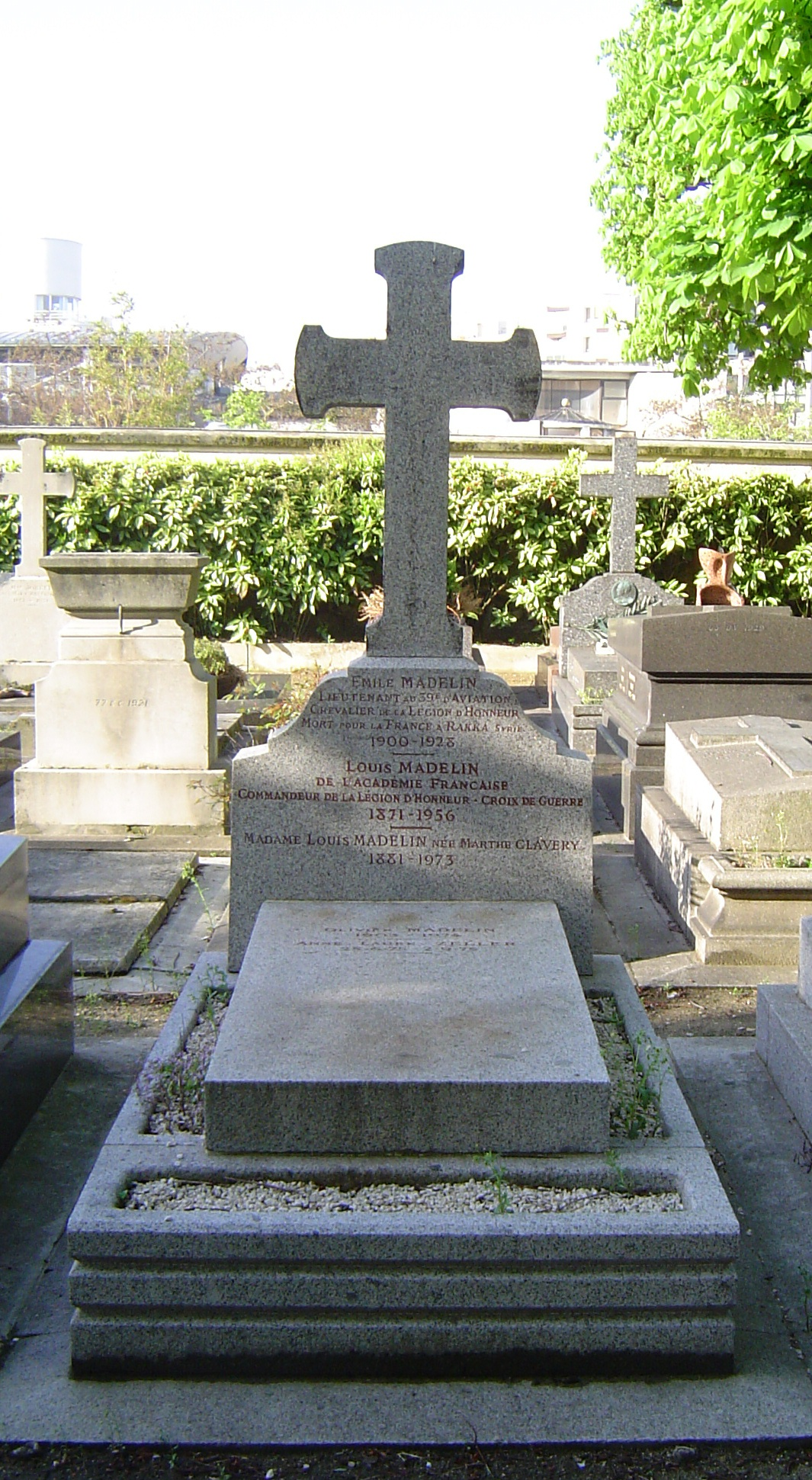
Tomb of Louis Madelin

The Cimetière de Grenelle is a 64 are cemetery on rue Saint-Charles in Grenelle, in the 15th arrondissement of Paris. It was set up in 1835 and annexed to the city of Paris in 1860. Those buried there include Louis Madelin and the Schmid and Rémondot families.
