= Balard station =

Metro station in Paris, France

Balard
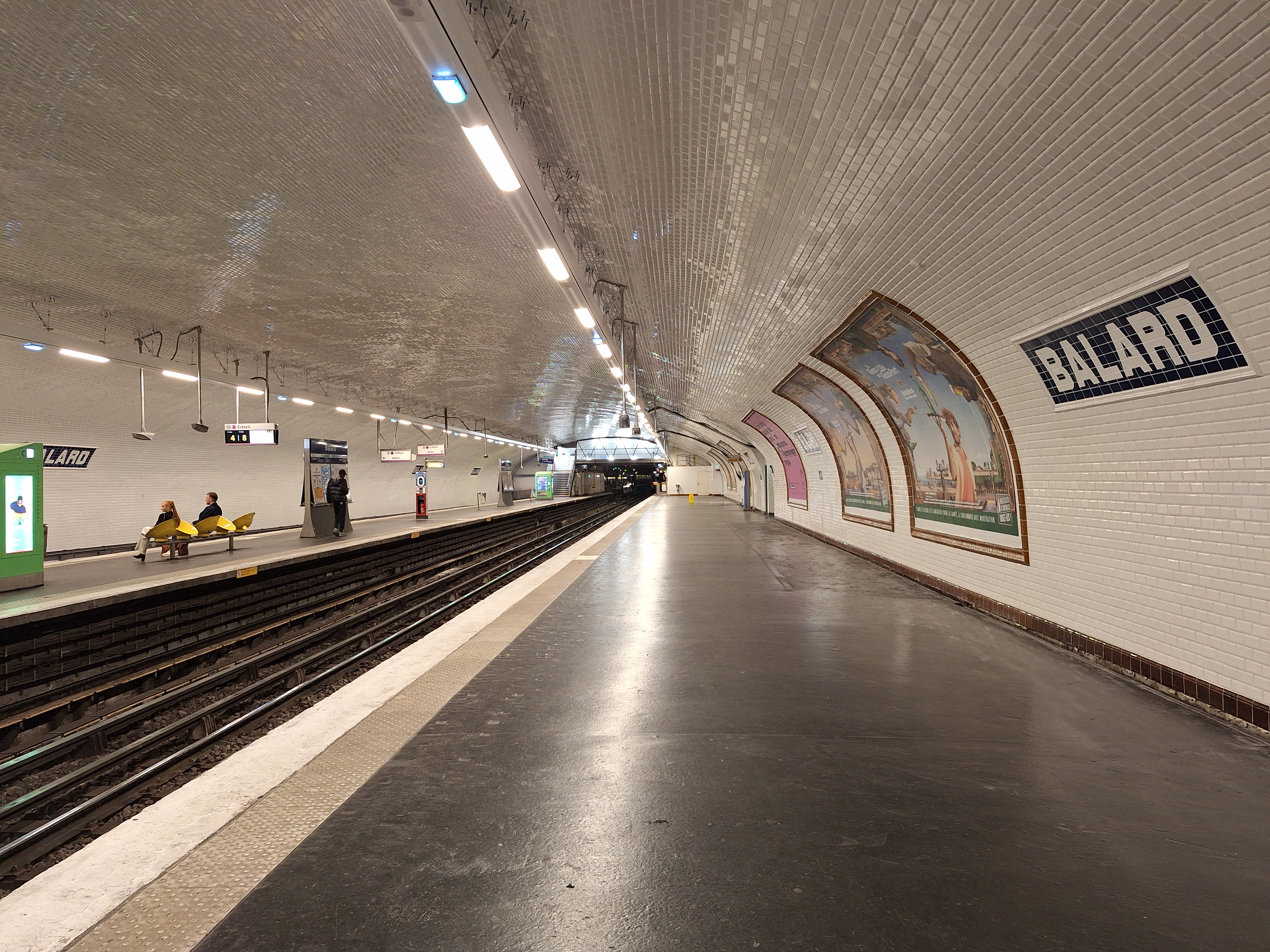

General information
- Location: 15th arrondissement of Paris; Île-de-France; France
- Coordinates: 48°50′09″N 2°16′42″E
- System: Paris Métro station
- Owner: RATP
- Operator: RATP
- Line: Paris Metro Paris Metro Line 8
- Platforms: 2 (1 island platform, 1 side platform)
- Tracks: 3

Construction
- Accessible: no

Other information
- Fare zone: 1

History
- Opened: 27 July 1937

Passengers
- 3,236,801 (2021)

Services
| Preceding station | Paris Metro | Following station |
|---|---|---|
| Terminus | Line 8 | Lourmel towards Pointe du Lac |
| Preceding station | Tram | Following station |
| Henri Farman towards Pont de Bezons | T2 transfer at Suzanne Lenglen | Porte d'Issy towards Porte de Versailles |
| Pont du Garigliano Terminus | T3a transfer at Balard | Desnouettes towards Porte de Vincennes |
Location
- Location within Paris

Balard (French pronunciation: [balaʁ]) is the southwestern terminus of Line 8 of the Paris Métro in the 15th arrondissement of Paris. Since 16 December 2006, it has also been a stop on tramway T3a as part of the initial section of the line between Pont du Garigliano and Porte d'Ivry. The station is named after Place Balard, itself named after Antoine-Jérôme Balard (1802-1876), a French chemist and the discoverer of bromine. Among the stations serving the Boulevards des Maréchaux along the former gates of Paris, it is the only one not called Porte de…, though it serves the Porte de Sèvres.

== History ==
The station opened on 27 July 1937 as part of the extension of line 8 from La Motte-Picquet - Grenelle, serving as its new south-western terminus.

On 3 September 1943, the Royal Air Force bombarded the area and destroyed the accesses to the station, causing the deaths of 22 people, including 2 CMP agents.

To facilitate a connection to tramway T2 via Suzanne Lenglen tram station (opened on 21 November 2009), an additional access (access 6) was constructed during the first phase of works between March and December 2012. In the second phase, three new lifts were added to improve the accessibility of the station between January 2014 and June 2015 for people with impaired mobility. This was to minimise disruption to traffic on line 8 and to coordinate with the construction of the Hexagone Balard, the new headquarters of the Ministry of Defense.The cost of the project, estimated to be approximately 16.4 million euros, was included in the budget for the extension of T2 from Issy–Val de Seine to Porte de Versailles which opened on 21 November 2009.

In 2019, the station was used by 5,626,040 passengers, making it the 68th busiest of the Métro network out of 302 stations.

In 2020, the station was used by 2,643,639 passengers amidst the COVID-19 pandemic, making it the 71st busiest of the Métro network out of 304 stations.

In 2021, the station was used by 3,236,801 passengers, making it the 95th busiest of the Métro network out of 304 stations.

== Passenger services ==
=== Access ===
The station has 6 accesses:

- Access 1: Boulevard Victor
- Access 2: Boulevard du Général Martial Valin Ministère de la Défense
- Access 3: rue Balard Hôpital Européen Georges Pompidou
- Access 4: avenue Félix Faure
- Access 5: avenue de la Porte de Sèvres (an ascending escalator)
- Access 6: rue Louis Armand Centre Aquatique Aquaboulevard (with an ascending escalator)

=== Station layout ===
Street Level
| B1 | Mezzanine |
| Platform level | Side platform, doors will open on the right |
| Platform level | Westbound | ← Alighting passengers only |
| Platform level | Eastbound | toward Pointe du Lac (Lourmel) → |
| Platform level | Island platform, doors will open on the left, right |
| Platform level | Eastbound | toward Pointe du Lac (Lourmel) → |

=== Platforms ===
The station has, as does Pointe du Lac located on the same line, a particular arrangement specific to the stations serving or had served as a terminus. It has three tracks and two platforms. The side platform serves as the arrival platform while the island platform serves as the departure platform. The walls of the western side of the platform are tiled with bevelled white tiles, with the name of the station written in earthenware and the advertising frames with plant motifs, also in earthenware, are honey-coloured. The rest of the station, however, is simply painted white, except for the parts below platform level which is painted grey with the station names written on enamel plates.

=== Other connections ===
==== RER ====
A remote connection with line C of the RER via Pont du Garigliano station is possible, although not shown today on RATP's métro maps, it was previously shown in 1998 and 2000. The connection is occasionally depicted in station locality maps but not on the line maps inside its trains.

==== Tramway ====
The station has been served by tramway T3a since 16 December 2006 via Balard tram station and by tramway T2 since 21 November 2009 via Suzanne Lenglen tram station about 140 metres away. It is one of four métro stations on the network that are located at one of the former gates of Paris and are served by two tram lines; the other three are Porte de Choisy (line 7), Porte de Versailles (line 12), and Porte de Vincennes (line 1). Basilique de Saint-Denis (line 13) is the only station served by two tram lines not located at one of the gates of Paris.

==== Bus ====
The station is also served by the following bus networks:

- RATP bus network: lines 30, 39,42, 88, and 169
- Noctilien: lines N13, N62, and N145
- Sénart bus network: line 54

== Popular culture ==
The station appeared in Monsieur Klein, a 1976 French film set in 1942 with Alain Delon as the titular role. He plays a short scene where he waits at one of the station's accesses.

== Nearby ==
- Aquaboulevard
- Directorate General for Civil Aviation
- Grand Pavois de Paris
- Héliport de Paris - Issy-les-Moulineaux - Valérie-André
- Hexagone Balard
- Parc omnisports Suzanne-Lenglen

== Gallery ==
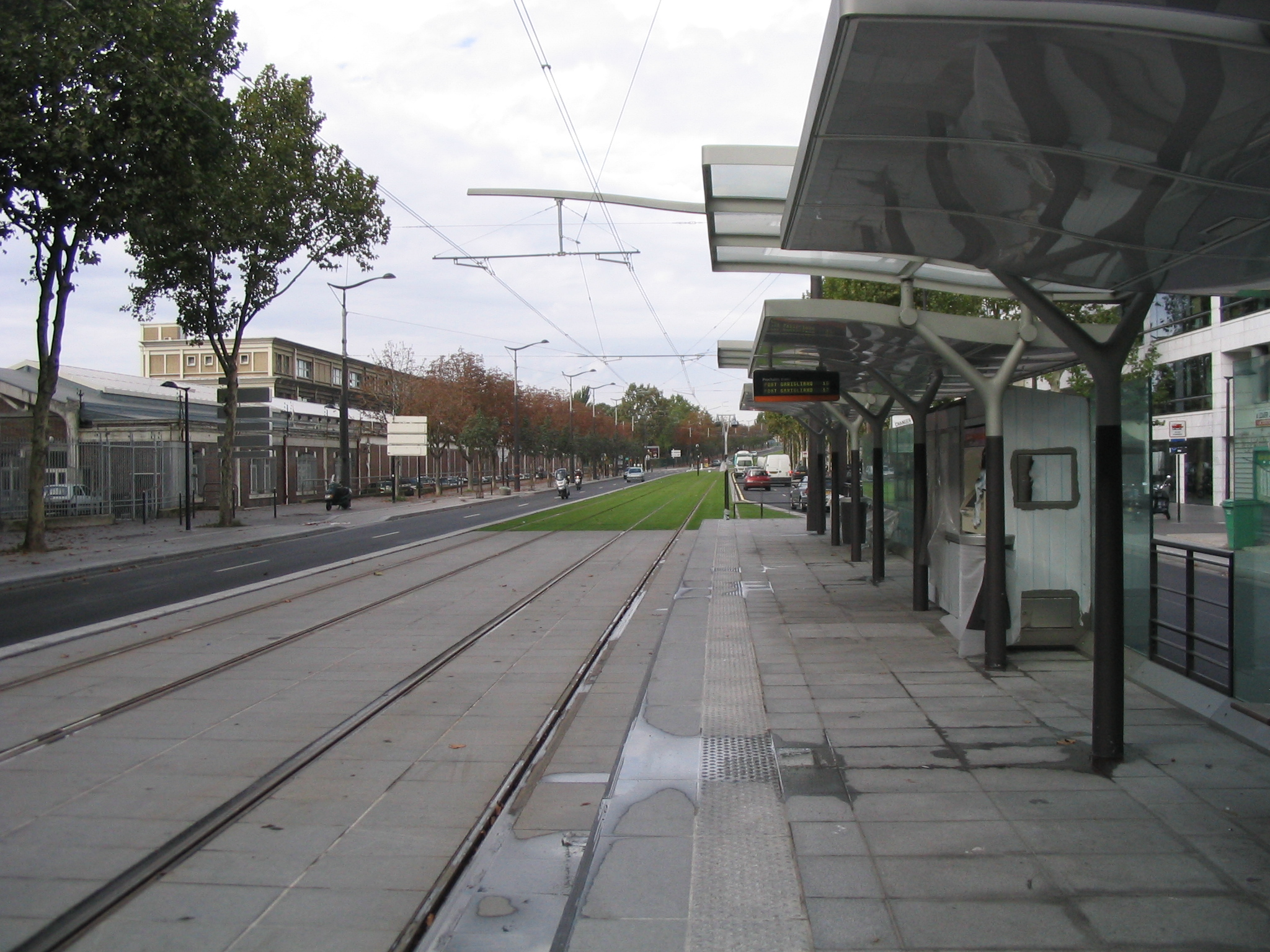
T3a tram station for services to Garigliano

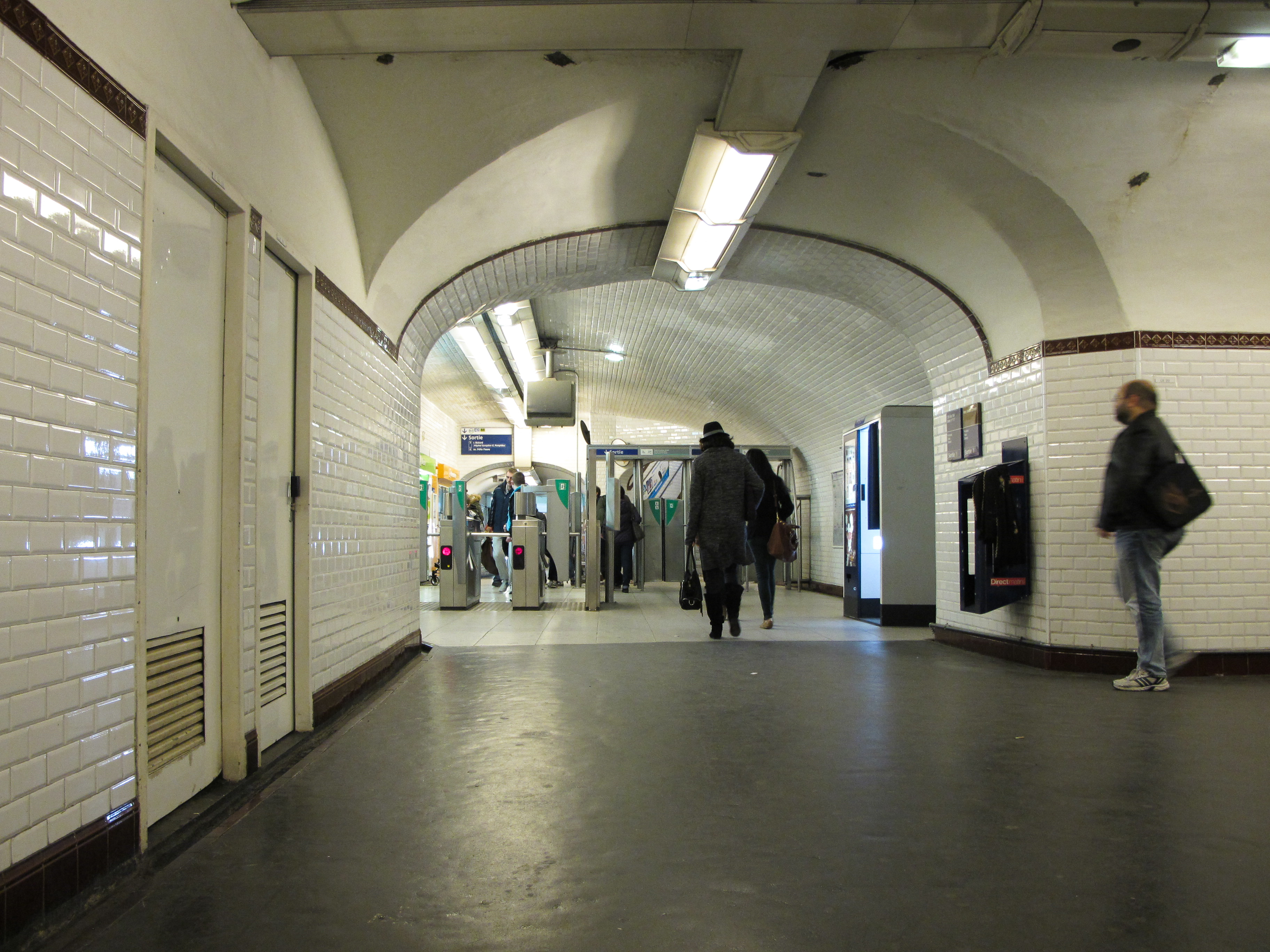
Ticket barriers at the mezzanine

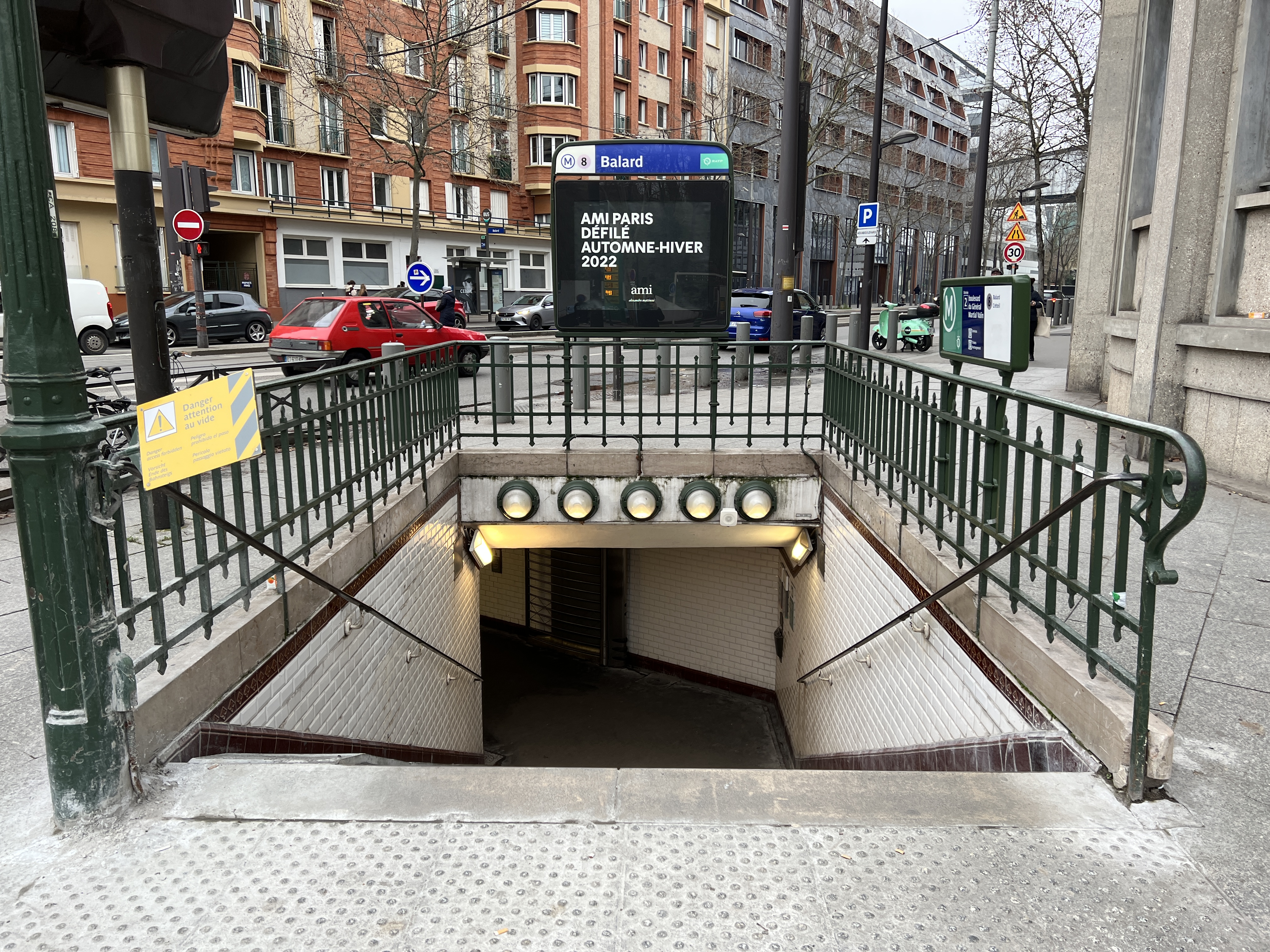
Access 1

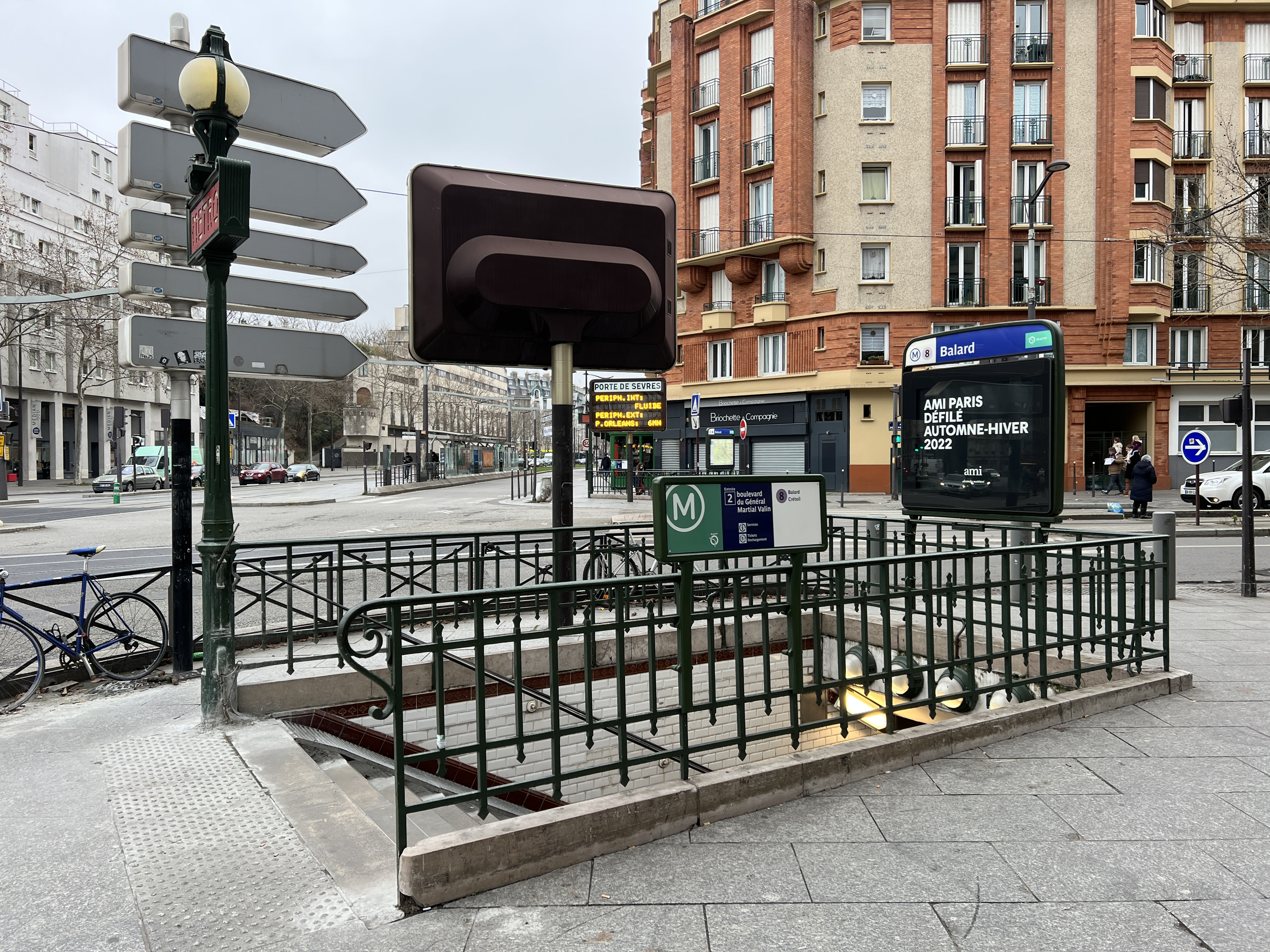
Access 2

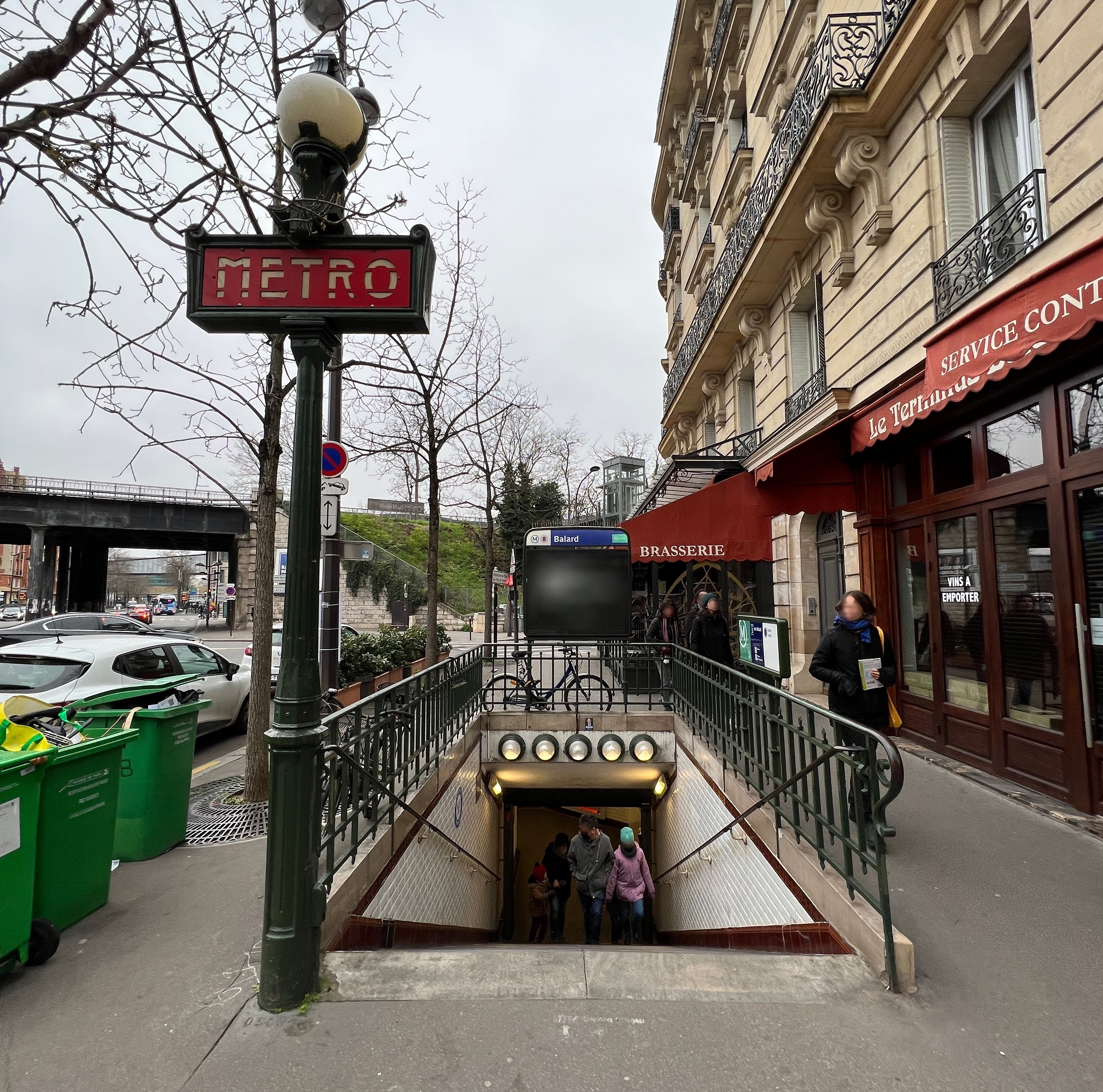
Access 3

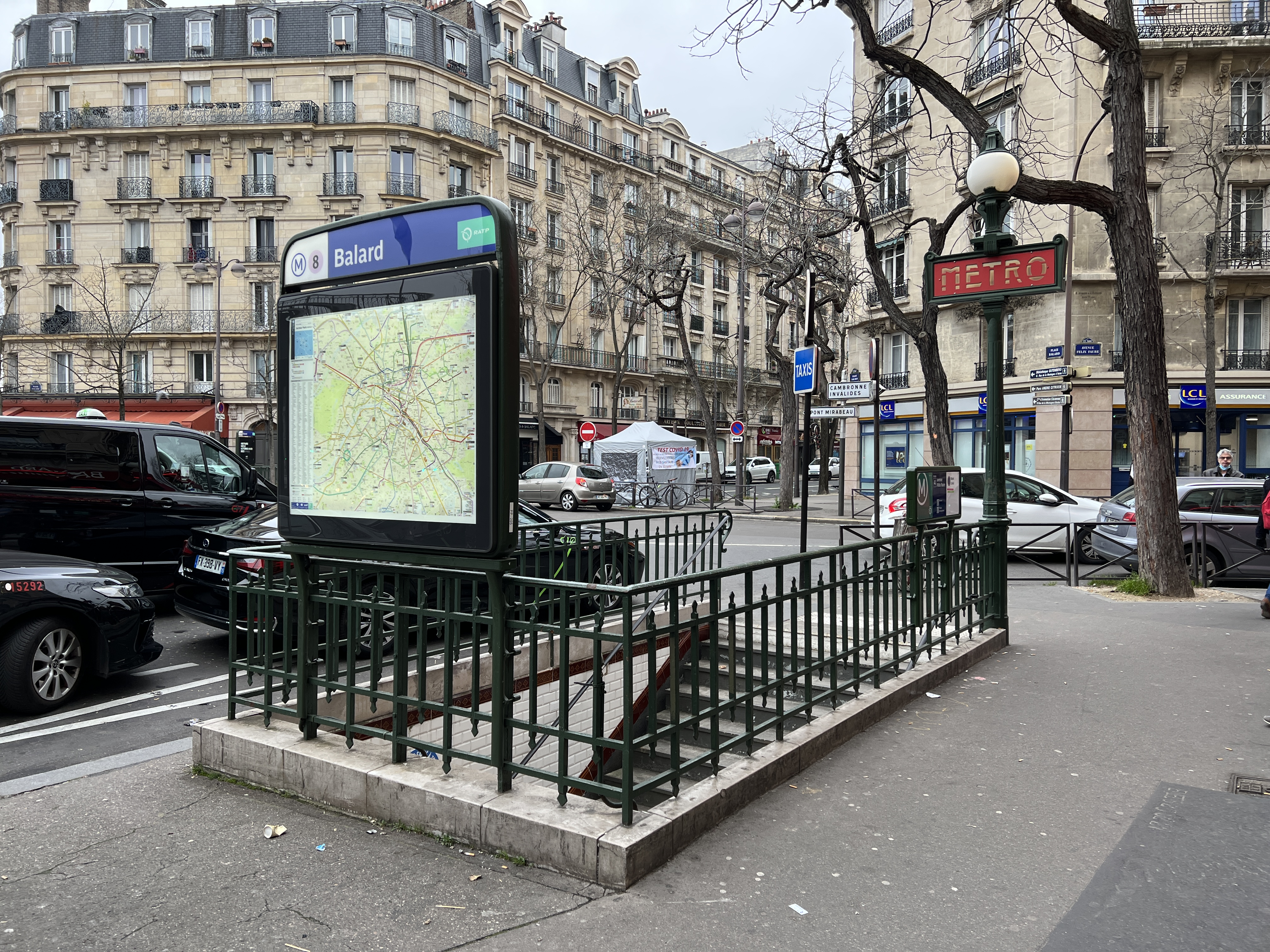
Access 4

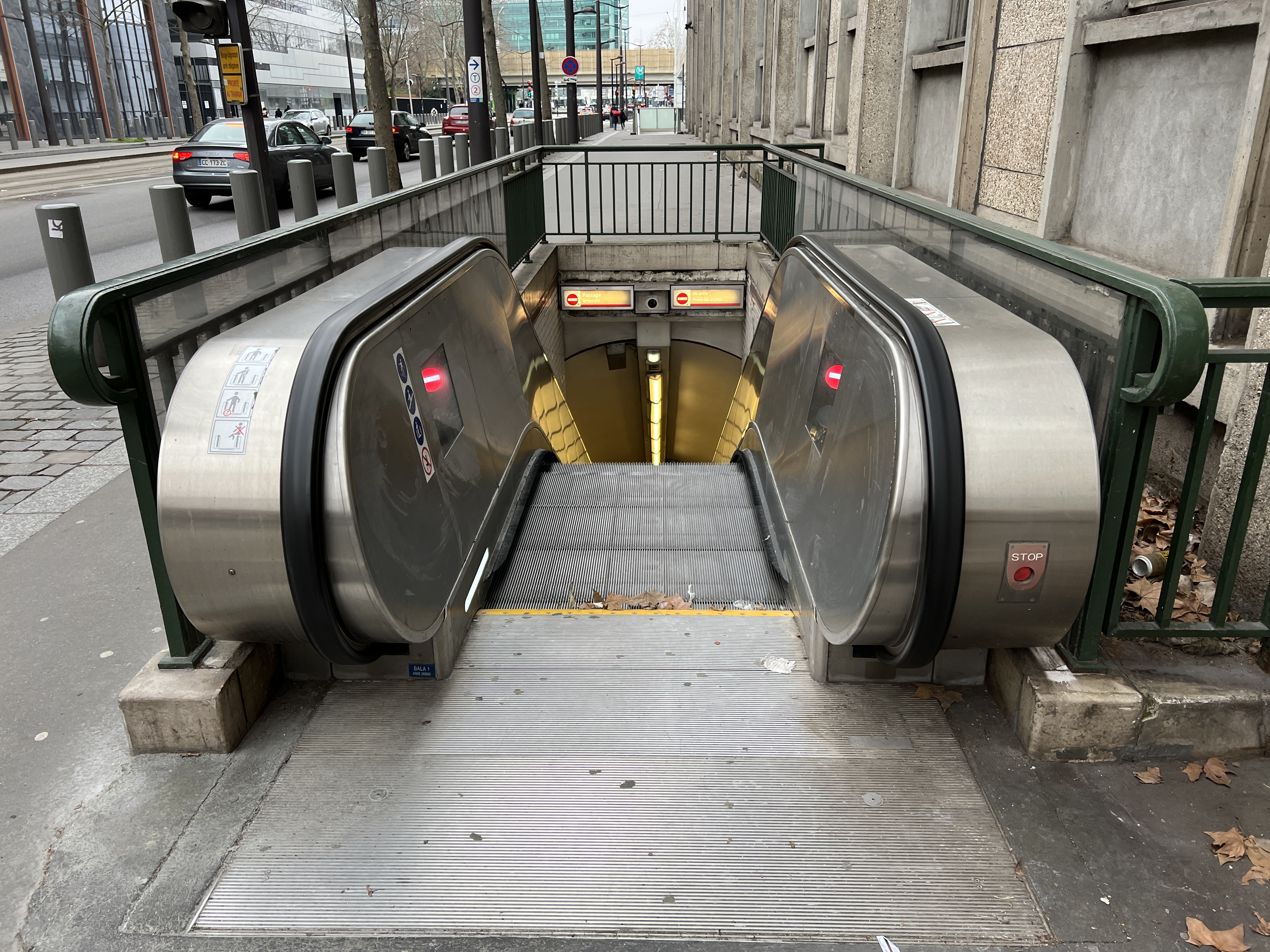
Access 5

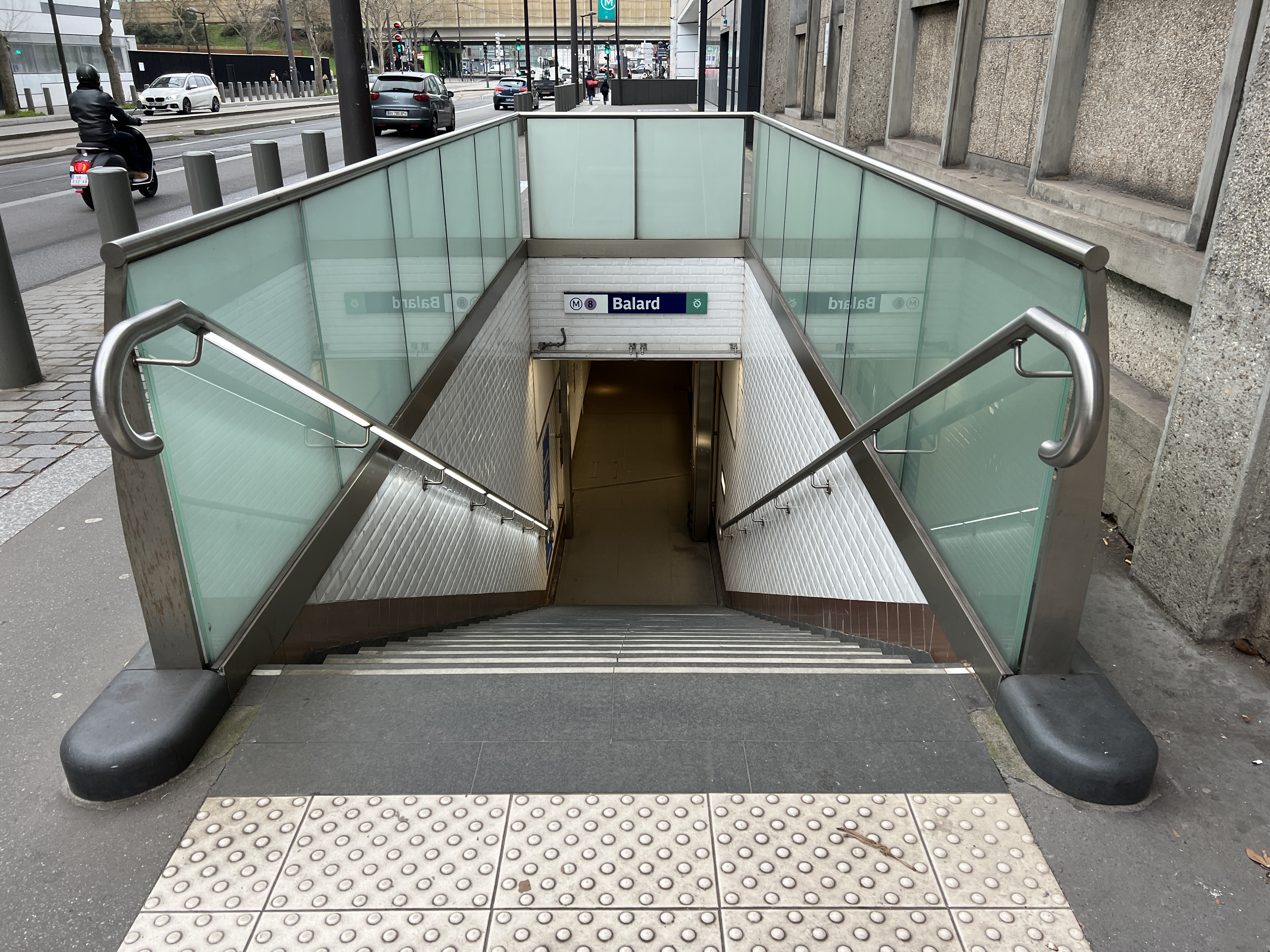
Access 6

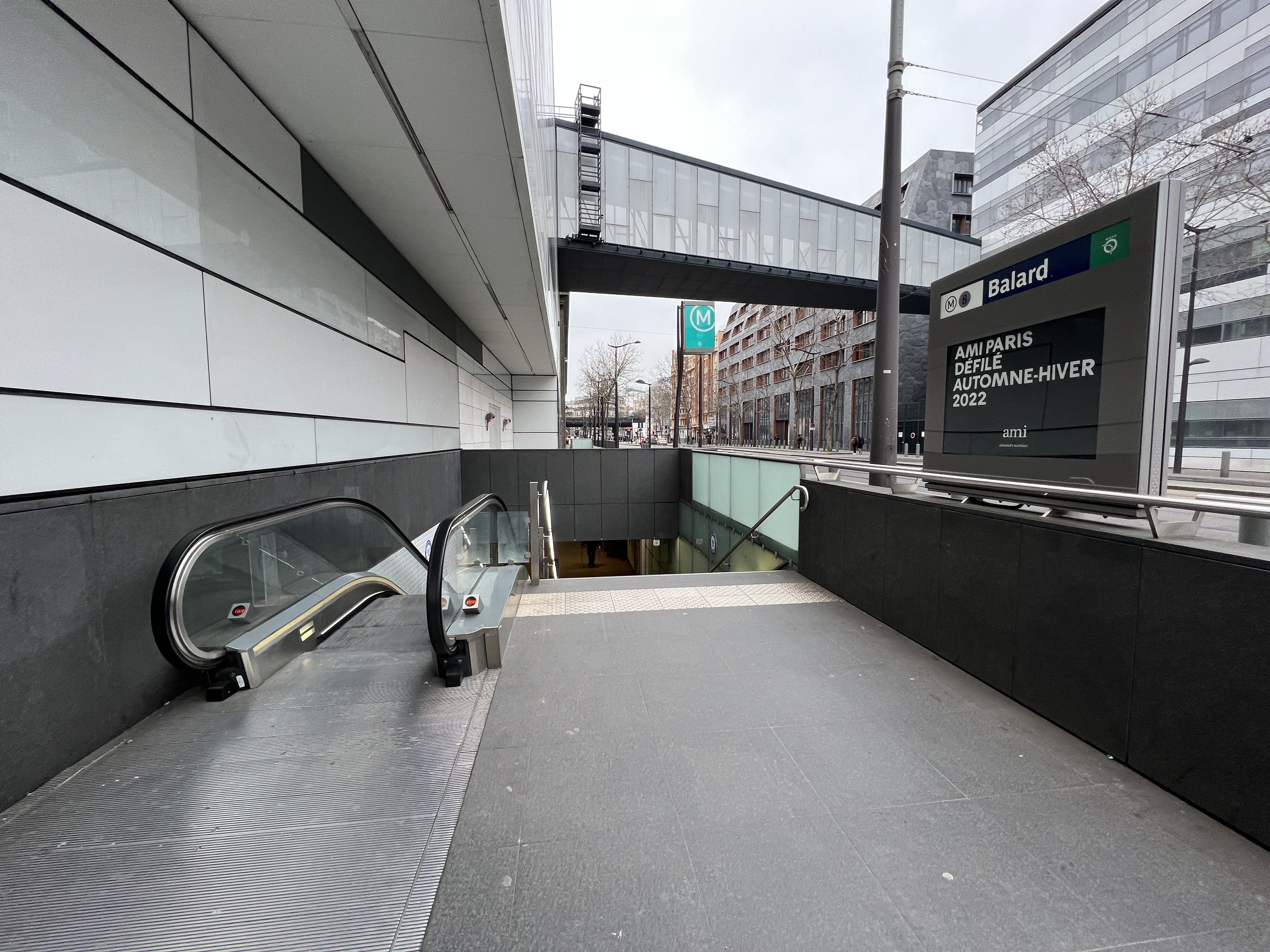
Access 6 with its escalator
