= Tropical sage =

Tropical sage is a common name for several plants and may refer to:

- Salvia coccinea, with red flowers
- Salvia misella, with blue flowers
- Salvia splendens, with red flowers
