= Jumart =

Hybrid creature in French folklore

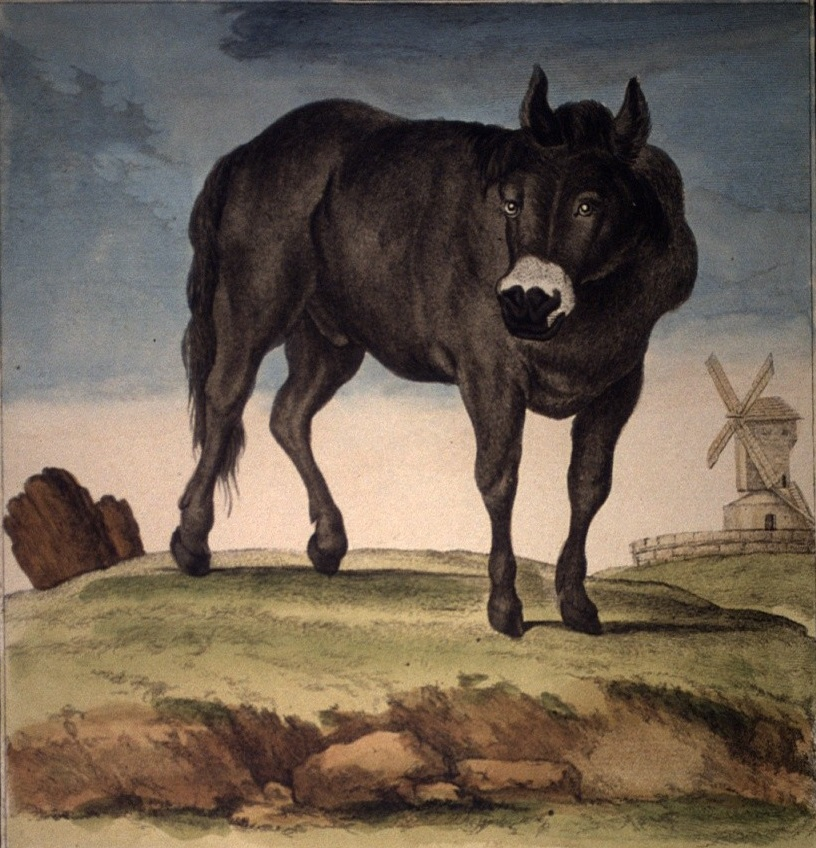
Le jumart as depicted in an engraving by Pierre-Joseph Buc'hoz

A jumart, bif, or baf is a mythical hybrid between a bull or cow and an equine (horse or donkey). Descriptions of such animals appear in numerous naturalist texts and travel accounts from the 1600s, 1700s, and 1800s.

Such hybridization is now believed to be biologically impossible. The described specimens are now thought to have been hinnies (hybrids of a male horses and female donkeys) or equines afflicted with achondroplasia.

== Etymology ==
The first record of a jumart appears in Conrad Gesner's Historia Animalium, published from 1551 to 1587, in which it is referred to as a jumar. The term first appears in a French-Latin dictionary in 1670 as jeumarre. Numerous alternate spellings and regional variants have been recorded; these include jumarre, jumerre, gimerre, gemar, gemart, gémart, jemerri, jeumarre, jimère, jumère, joumar, and choumarrou. The terms baf (for the issue of a bull and a mare), bif (the issue of a bull and a donkey), kumrah, hinnulus, and hippotaure were also employed.

The Provençal writer Frédéric Mistral proposed that the term jumart (jumarre) may derive from chimera. The writer Jacques Mulliez noted in a later essay that the term chimera was used often used to describe a hermaphroditic livestock animal, an infertile or masculine woman, or an animal with a malformed jaw.

The philologist and literary critic Leo Spitzer proposes that jumart may be a regional pronunciation of the French word for mare, jument. He also suggests a relation to the word gimère, which he defines as a 14th century term for a pièce en fer du moulin (an iron piece of a windmill), possibly referring to the animal's protruding lower jaw. Other possible derivations include the Algerian word for donkey, hmara, the Hebrew word for donkey, chamor, and the French word for twin, jumeau.

In Italian, the jumart is referred to as a gimerou, giumarro, or gimerro.

== Description ==
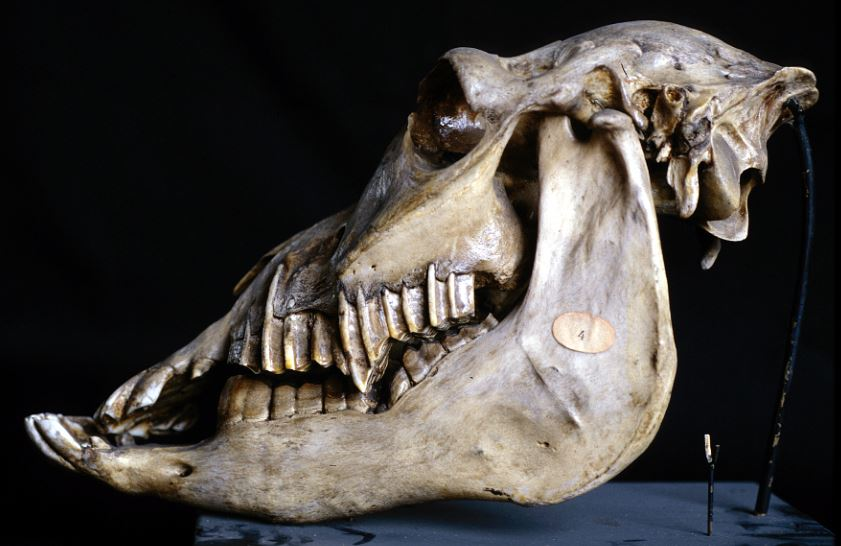
A skull once thought to belong to a jumart from the collection of the Musée Fragonard d'Alfort.

The jumart is most often described as having the body of an equine with the head (and sometimes the tail) of a bovine. It is generally described as lacking horns but possessing small protrusions on its head in place of horns. Other accounts describe the jumart as being nearly indistinguishable from an ordinary mule.

The jumart is frequently described as having an upper jaw which is shorter than the lower jaw (though one account reverses this, describing the animal as having "upper fore-teeth remarkably more forward than their under.") Some accounts reported that jumarts fathered by bulls lacked incisors in their upper jaws.

Jumarts were generally described as being small in stature. The French naturalist Pierre-Joseph Buc'hoz gave the animal's height as "trois pieds, deux pouces" (literally "three feet and two thumbs"), or approximately 1.03m. The agronomist André Sarcey de Sutières, who claimed to own three of the animals, gave a similar estimate of trois pieds, trois pouces. The pastor Jean de Léger reported that jumarts produced from bulls and mares ("bafs") were, predictably, said to be larger than those produced from bulls and jennies ("bifs"). Jumarts were frequently described as displaying strength out of proportion to their stature.

The French zoologist and hippiatrie (equine physician) François-Alexandre de Garsault reported that the jumart (like its non-fictional counterpart the mule) was sterile despite possessing reproductive organs.

== Behavior ==
The jumart was generally described as having an obstinate and vicious temperament. Léger reported that the creature was said to eat little and travel swiftly. By contrast, the Italian writer Giuseppe Barreti describes it as "a sluggish beast; scarcely sensible of the bit and whip; but wonderfully sure-footed." Several accounts highlight the jumart’s utility as a mount and pack animal.

According to an account by the Genevan naturalist Charles Bonnet, the cry of a jumart did not resemble that of either of its parents but was similar to that of a goat.

== Selected examples ==
=== English-language accounts ===
The Scottish surgeon Patrick Blair includes an account of the jumart in his 1720 Botanic Essays in Two Parts:

"And when of a Bull and a She-Ass is procreated a certain Animal, called Joumar*, as I am credibly inform'd by the Intelligent Dr. [James] Sherard, who has often seen them in Turkey, where they are very frequent, and of great Use, as being excellent Beasts of Burthen [stet] and of a quick Pace upon a March, a property not very incident either to Father or Mother."

The English cleric Thomas Sedgwick recounts his ride on a supposed jumart in 1738:

"Now, at first I thought it was a sturdy, wicked-looking mule; but on eyeing him again and again my belief was staggered, and I asked the Prieur's man, who followed me, what manner of brute it might be"..."On I went then, on my jumarre, examining him from head to foot, and, above all things, having an eye to his vile dispositions to break my neck down the rocks"..."Did Vincent's mule dare approach it, a bite and a kick were his sure welcome."

The missionary Thomas Shaw describes an alleged donkey-cow hybrid in his 1757 work Travels, or observations relating to several parts of Barbary and the Levant:

"To the Mule we may joyn [stet] the Kumrah, as, I think, these People call a little serviceable Beast of Burthen [stet] begot betwixt an Ass and a Cow. That which I saw was single hoofed like the Ass but distinguished from It in all other Respects, having a sleeker Skin and the Tail and Head (excepting the Horns) in Fashion of the Dam's."

=== Official records and purported specimens ===
A review on the legendary hybrid authored by Daniel Meslé notes that jumarts appeared on a statistical inventory of livestock of the Alpes-de-Haute-Provence published in 1804 alongside mules and were recorded in numerous provinces in the southeast of France.

The Musée Fragonard d'Alfort, a museum of anatomical oddities located in the École Nationale Vétérinaire has the skull of an alleged jumart in its collection (now known to be a horse with achondroplasia).

== Scientific investigations ==
The existence of the jumart was a subject of vigorous debate among prominent naturalists in the 1800s, including Valmont de Bomare, Felix Vicq d'Azyr, George-Louis Leclerc Compte de Buffon, Charles Bonnet, and Claude Bourgelat.

The Italian biologist Lazzaro Spallanzani unsuccessfully attempted to create a jumart by cross-breeding a bull to a female donkey. The Marquis Brézé attempted to cross a horse and a cow and a bull and a mare but was unable to induce either pair to copulate.

The German physiologist Johann Friedrich Blumenbach recounts the dissection of four alleged jumarts, two ordered by the Compte de Buffon and two ordered by the Cardinal delle Lanze at the request of Bonnet and Spallanzani. None bore any evidence of their supposed bovine heritage, and the latter two were concluded to be hinnies.

The Italian physiologist Leopold Marcantonio Caldani made unsuccessfully attempts to determine the parentage of supposed specimens sold to naturalists by French peasants. A friend to whom he entrusted this task reported back:

"All [of my correspondents] have replied to me that from their exact inquiries they have not gained anything except that the animals are certainly either ugly, deformed, hairy mules born from she-ass and horse, or ugly, very small, very hairy asses born from ass and she-ass."

== Proposed origins of the myth ==
=== Hinnies ===
The British botanist Thomas Andrew Knight noted that hinnies (hybrids resulting from crosses between male horses and female donkeys) were said to differ in appearance from the more common donkey-mare crosses and might thus be mistaken for jumarts. Hinnies tend to have shorter ears, stronger legs, and a thicker mane than their reciprocal hybrids due to genetic imprinting.

=== Achondroplasia ===
The Musée Fragonard d'Alfort, a museum of anatomical oddities located in the École Nationale Vétérinaire identifies a skull in their collection once purported to belong to a jumart as that of a horse with achondroplasia, a form of dwarfism; equine achondroplasia is caused by a recessive mutation, such that an animal with the condition could be born from an unaffected mother. Christophe Degueurce, the director of the Musée Fragonard d'Alfort notes that this mutation is unusually prevalent in the Dauphiné region of southeast France from which many reports of jumarts originate. The Merck Veterinary Manual notes that dwarf horses are prone to prognathia, a condition in which the mandible is relatively longer than the maxilla.

=== Economic incentives ===
Daniel Meslé noted that the debate over the existence of the jumart was motivated by both economic and scientific interest, as the reported qualities of the animal would have made it useful in the agricultural industry. An article penned by embryologist Arthur Meyer in 1932 soliciting funding for experiments in artificial insemination proposes that such an animal would be "highly advantageous to mankind."

The American science historian Conway Zirkle notes that the owners of so-called jumarts also stood to gain from perpetuating the hoax:

"It need not surprise us to learn that there actually was a practically unlimited supply of jumars...It is true that most of them were old, and practically useless as beasts of burden, and it is also very probable that the learned doctors who were interested in dissecting jumars offered more money for them than their owners could get from the eighteenth-century equivalent of the glue factory. Under such circumstances we would expect jumars to appear on the market."

== Cultural impact ==
The jumart was one of the domesticated animals for which a dedicated day in the French Republican calendar was proposed (the 15th of Messidor); however it was replaced with the chamois in the final calendar.

According to a social media post by the Italian museum L'Ecomuseo delle Miniere e della Valle Germanasca, the saying "fort coum un gimerou" or "forte come un giumarro" ("strong as a jumart") persists in Italian reference to the strength of the mythical animal.

== Gallery ==
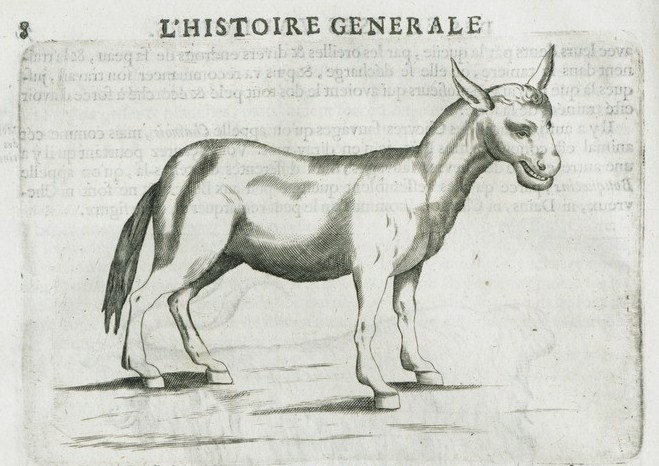
A jumart as depicted by Jean de Léger in 1669.

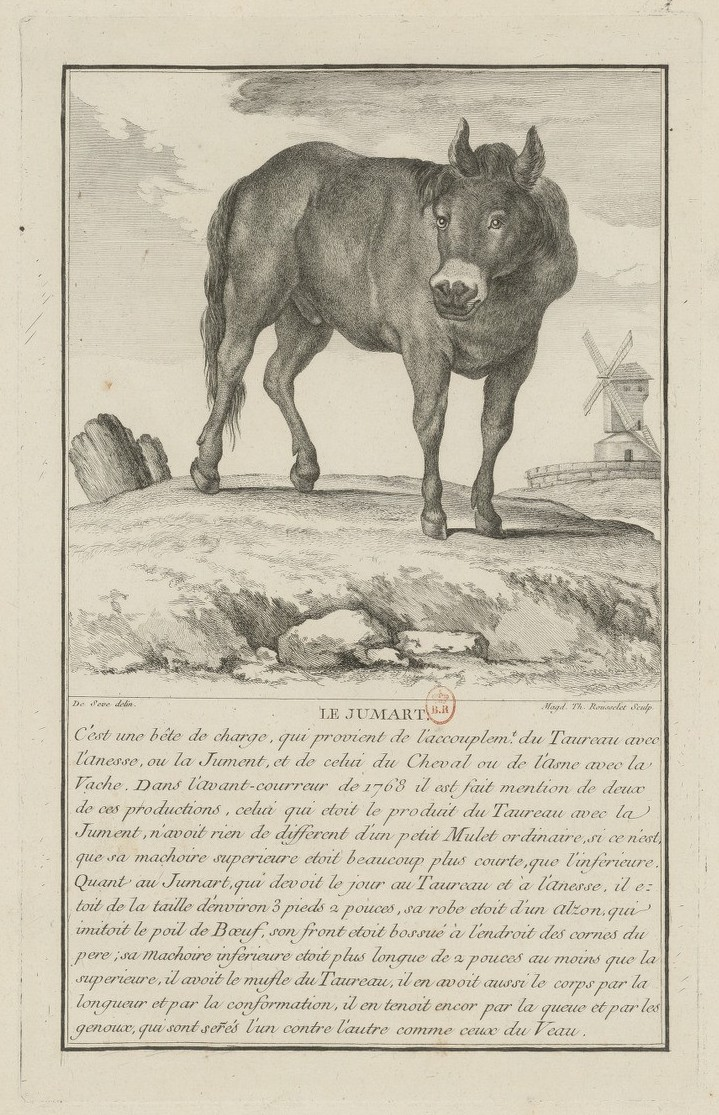
The full jumart plate published by Pierre-Joseph Buc'hoz in 1776 - in black and white.

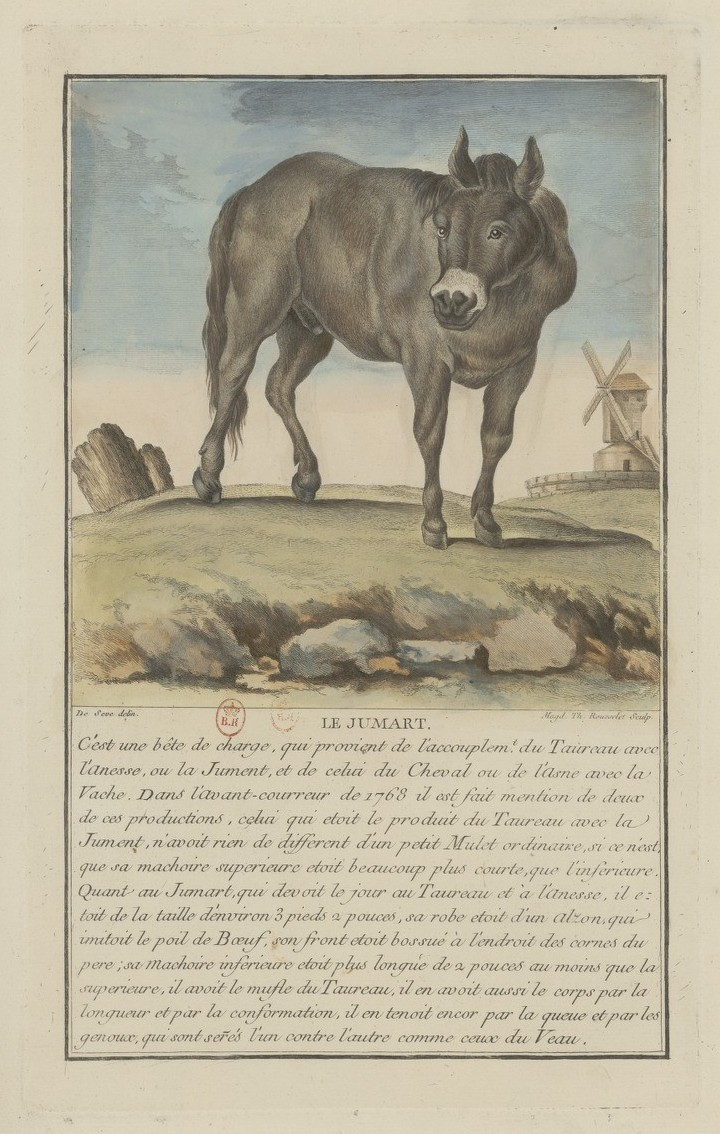
The full jumart plate published by Pierre-Joseph Buc'hoz in 1776 - colored.

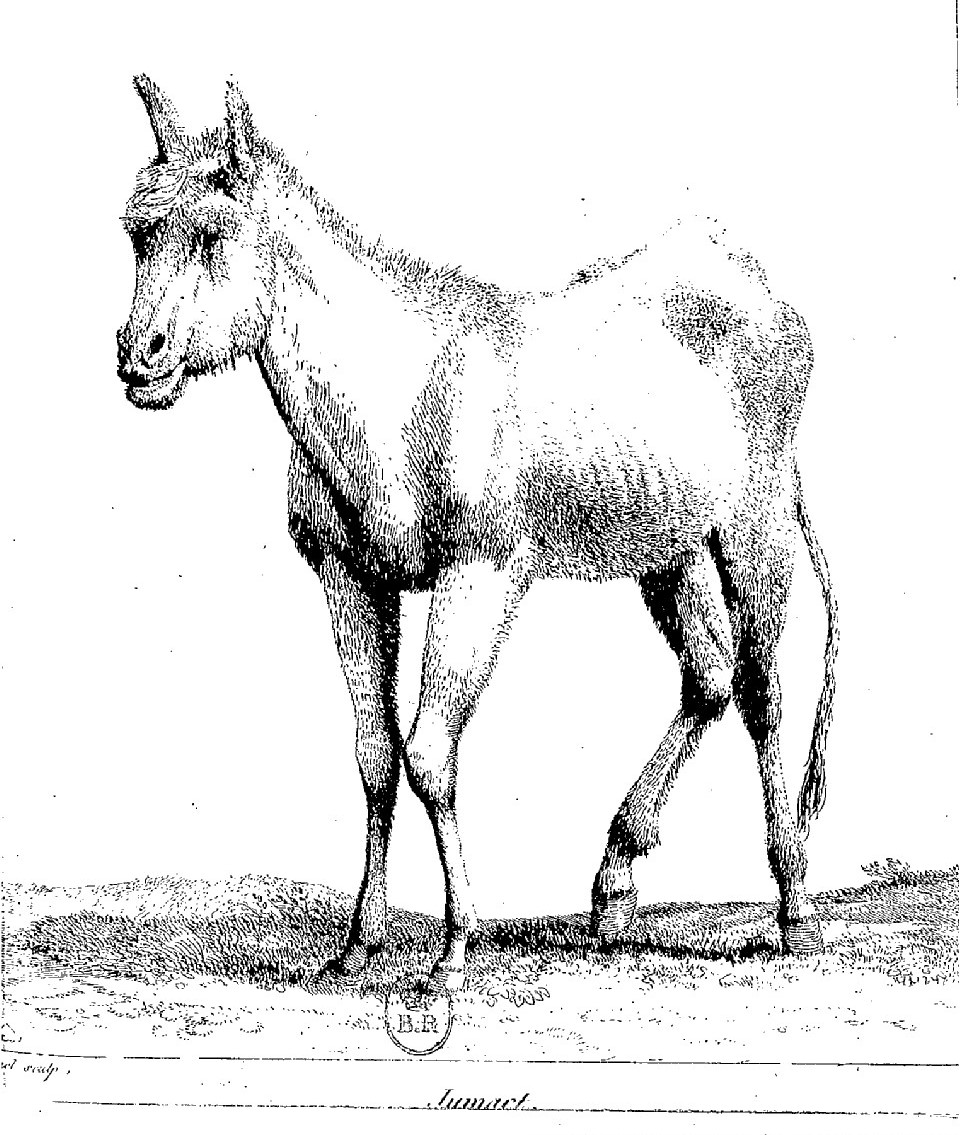
A jumart as depicted by the French engraver Jean-Pierre Houël.

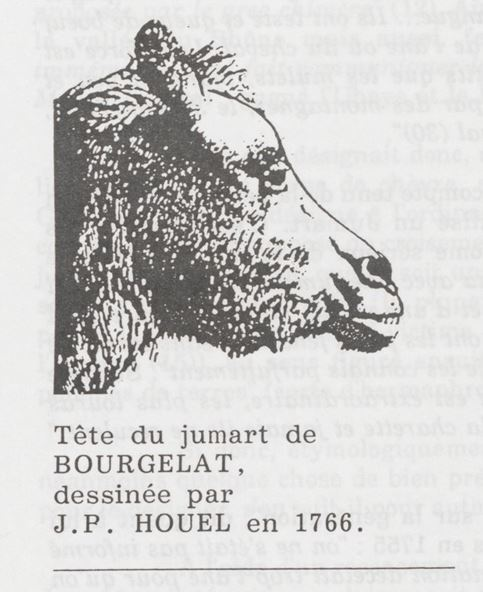
The head of a jumart as depicted by the French engraver Jean-Pierre Houël
