= Musée d'Anatomie Delmas-Orfila-Rouvière =

Former museum of wax anatomical items in Paris

Coordinates: 48.8558°N 2.3320°E

The Musée d'Anatomie Delmas-Orfila-Rouvière was a museum of anatomy formerly located on the eighth floor of the Faculty of Medicine, Paris V René Descartes University, 45, rue des Saints-Pères, 6th arrondissement of Paris, France. It was the largest anatomy museum in France. It was closed around 2005, with all its exhibits going into storage.

In 2011 the collections were donated to the University of Montpellier and are on display in the Medical School.

== History ==
The museum dated from 1794 when Honoré Fragonard, demonstrator and professor of anatomy, collected specimens for the Faculty of Medicine of Paris's new anatomical cabinet. Although the city had contained earlier, amateur collections, including a set of more than 1000 wax anatomical models bequeathed by Jean-Baptiste Sue to the École des Beaux-Arts, these earlier collections were dispersed during the French Revolution.

The cabinet's anatomical collection was reorganized and vigorously expanded by Mathieu Orfila. Appointed dean of the Faculty of Medicine of Paris in 1832, Orfila visited the Hunterian Museum and was inspired by its collections of comparative anatomy. In 1844 he established a museum, which in 1847 was formally inaugurated and named the Musée Orfila in his honor. By 1881 it contained nearly 4500 items, as documented in the catalog published by its curator, Charles Nicolas Houel. Unfortunately, during the early 20th century, the museum fell into great disrepair. According to the museum's web site, precious wax models by Laumonier were consumed for lighting, and only a few hundred of Houel's cataloged items still remain. In 1947, however, Prof. André Delmas began an effort to restore and greatly enlarge the Musée Orfila, conjoining it with the Musée Rouvière, the lymphatic collection of Prof. Henri Rouvière (1876-1952). Since 1953 the museum occupied the vast exhibition halls and galleries of the eighth floor of the Faculty of Medicine.

The museum contained about 5,800 human and animal anatomical items. It contained a wide range of anatomical specimens, including a small monkey preserved by Fragonard in 1797; Paul Broca's castings brains of birds, mammals, and humans, including the brains of children, criminals, and representatives of various races, as well as his own brain; showcases of comparative anatomy of reptiles and birds; casts of the heads of criminals executed during the 19th century; a collection of skulls from asylums for the mentally ill; major exhibits of different stages of growth of the skeleton, splanchnology (casts of livers, hearts, lungs, and trachea), and of the viscera and major vessels of the human body; and displays of malformations of the brain caused in rats (Giroud-Delmas), lymph systems (Marie Philibert Constant Sappey), kidney structure (Augier), trachea (Eralp), esophagus (Sussini), and liver. It also included the Spitzner collection, a famous set of anatomical wax models dating from the 19th Century.

== See also ==
- List of museums in Paris
- Musée Dupuytren
- Musée Fragonard d'Alfort, Maisons-Alfort
