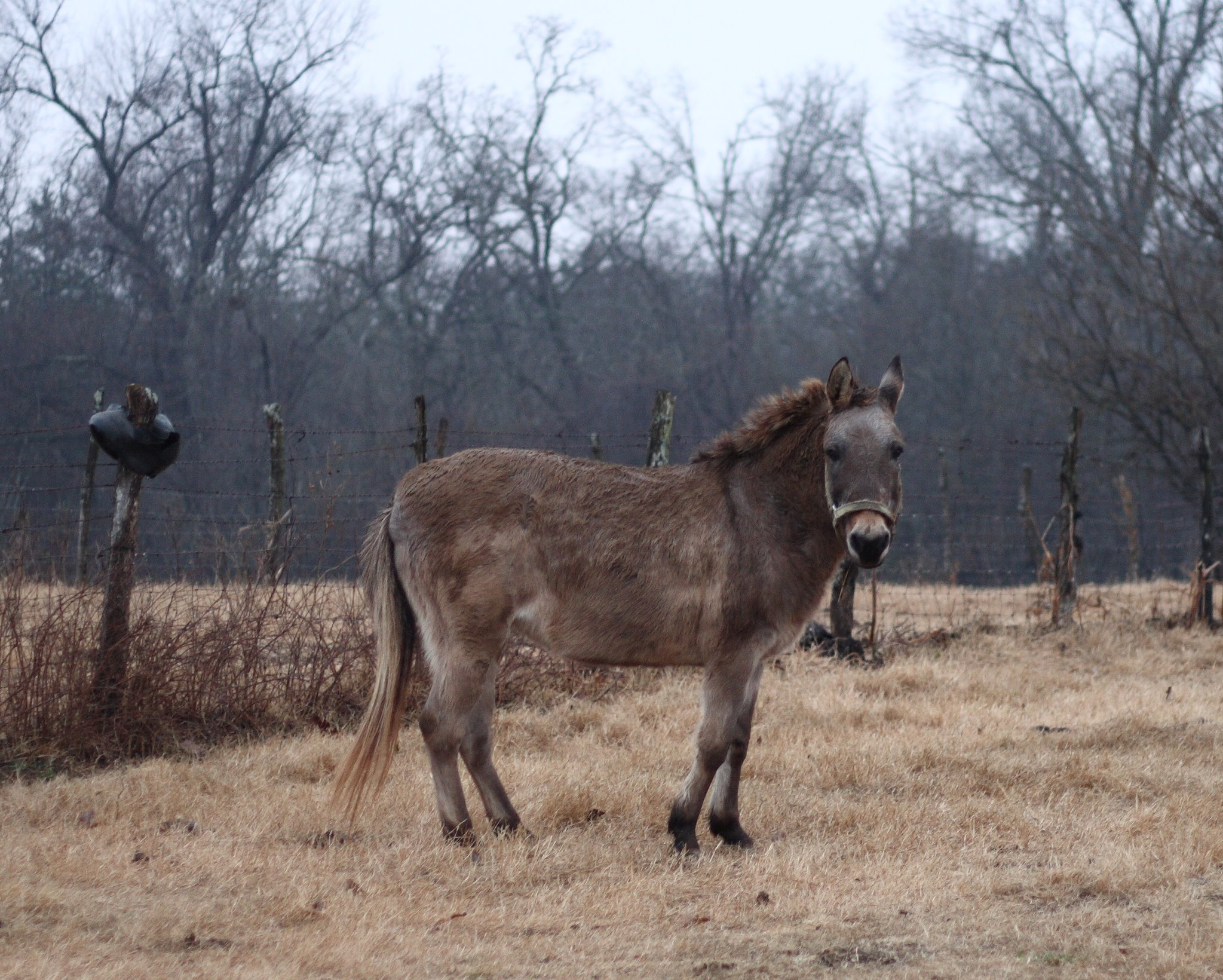

Conservation status
- Domesticated

Scientific classification
- Kingdom: Animalia
- Phylum: Chordata
- Class: Mammalia
- Order: Perissodactyla
- Family: Equidae
- Subtribe: Equina
- Genus: Equus
- Species: E. caballus♂ × E. asinus♀

= Hinny =

Domestic horse–donkey hybrid

The hinny is a domestic equine hybrid, being the offspring of a male horse (a stallion) and a female donkey (a jenny). It is the reciprocal cross to the more common mule, which is the product of a male donkey (a jack) and a female horse (a mare). The hinny is distinct from the mule both in physiology and temperament as a consequence of genomic imprinting; it is also less common.

Many supposed examples of the jumart, which were thought to be a hybrid between a horse and a cow in European folklore, were found to be hinnies.

== Description ==
The hinny is the offspring of a stallion and a jenny or female donkey, and is thus the reciprocal cross to the more common mule foaled by a jack (male donkey) out of a mare. Like the mule, the hinny displays hybrid vigour (heterosis).

In general terms, in both these hybrids the foreparts and head of the animal are similar to those of the sire, while the hindparts and tail are more similar to those of the dam. A hinny is generally smaller than a mule, with shorter ears and a lighter head; the tail is tasselled like that of its donkey mother.

The distinct phenotypes of the hinny and the mule are partly attributable to genomic imprinting – an element of epigenetic inheritance. Hinnies and mules differ in temperament despite sharing nuclear genomes, with hinnies tending to be quieter and closer in temperament to donkeys; this too is believed to be attributable to the action of imprinted genes.

== Fertility, sterility, and rarity ==
According to most reports, hinnies are sterile and are not capable of reproduction. The male hinny can mate but has testicles that will only produce malformed spermatozoa. The dam of a foal carried to term in Henan, China, in 1981, is variously reported to have been a mule or a hinny.
