= Jean-Robert =

Jean-Robert is a French masculine given name. Notable people with the name include:

- Jean-Robert Argand (1768–1822), French gifted amateur mathematician
- Jean-Robert Bellande (born 1970), American nightclub owner, promoter and poker player
- Jean-Robert Gauthier (1929–2009), Canadian politician
- Jean-Robert Ipoustéguy (1920–2006), French sculptor
- Jean-Robert Royer (1990–), Canadian guitar teacher, Realtor
