= André Suchetet =

French politician (1849–1910)

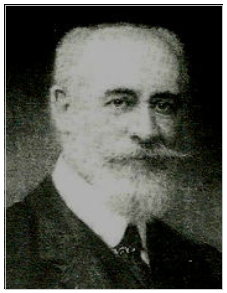

André Suchetet (6 March 1849 – 15 July 1910) was a French politician, artist, philanthropist, land-owner, agriculturist and naturalist. He studied animal hybridization and was involved in a study of "Jumart" legends - supposedly hybrids of cows and horses. He examined the evidence and showed that nobody had every seen one and that hybrids could only form between closely related animals.

== Life and work ==
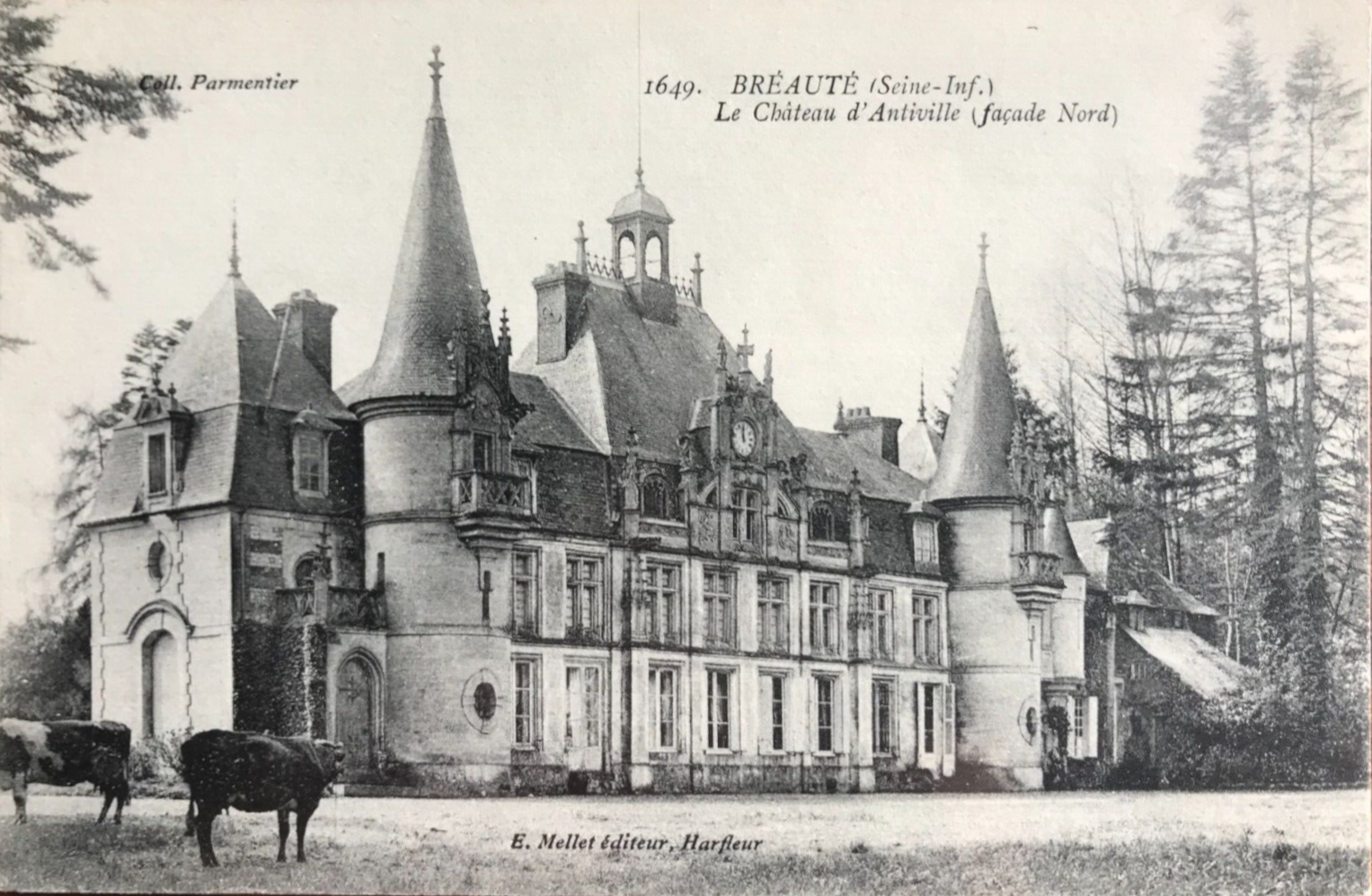
Chateau d'Antiville

Suchetet was born in Elbeuf, the son of textile manufacturer Achille Suchetet (1820-1853) and Cécile Louise Marie Delarue (1826-1854). An ancestor Jean-Baptiste Suchetet had established a textile industry in the city. His uncle Hector was mayor of Caudebec-lès-Elbeuf in 1870. When Suchetet turned five, he was orphaned and was raised by grandparents in Rouen and grew up in Institution Patry. He was drafted during the 1870 war and served in Paris. He married Augustine Aglaé Laguette (1852-1917) in 1871 and they would have eight children. He lived on rents from land that he had inherited and lived in Antiville castle from 1880. He conducted amateur researchers in agriculture, livestock and had a particular interest on the hybridization of birds and wrote to the learned societies. He also studied the legends of "jumarts" - supposed hybrids between horses and cows and was able to determine that there was no evidence. He published his notes in La fable des Jumarts (1889). He also pointed out that hybrids could form only between closely related species of animals. He also painted several murals in chapels.

Suchetet was a staunch Catholic and supported the construction of a school for girls, donated for a hospice in Elbeuf and founded an orphanage, Foundation Olivier-Suchetet, along with family members. He was awarded the order of Saint Gregory the Great for his work.

He became a municipal councillor of Bréauté in 1882 and became mayor in 1892. He headed the commune for many years and later became a House member represented the Republicans in 1902 in the legislature. He took part in parliamentary discussions and supported agricultural measures to improve oilseed production, cultivation of flax and hemp, protection of birds in agriculture and the protection of French fishermen.

He died at his castle at the age of 61 and was buried in Bréauté.
