= Honoré Fragonard =

French anatomist

- Born: 13 June 1732; Grasse, France
- Died: 5 April 1799 (aged 66); Charenton, France
- Known for: His work as an anatomist, specialising in écorchés

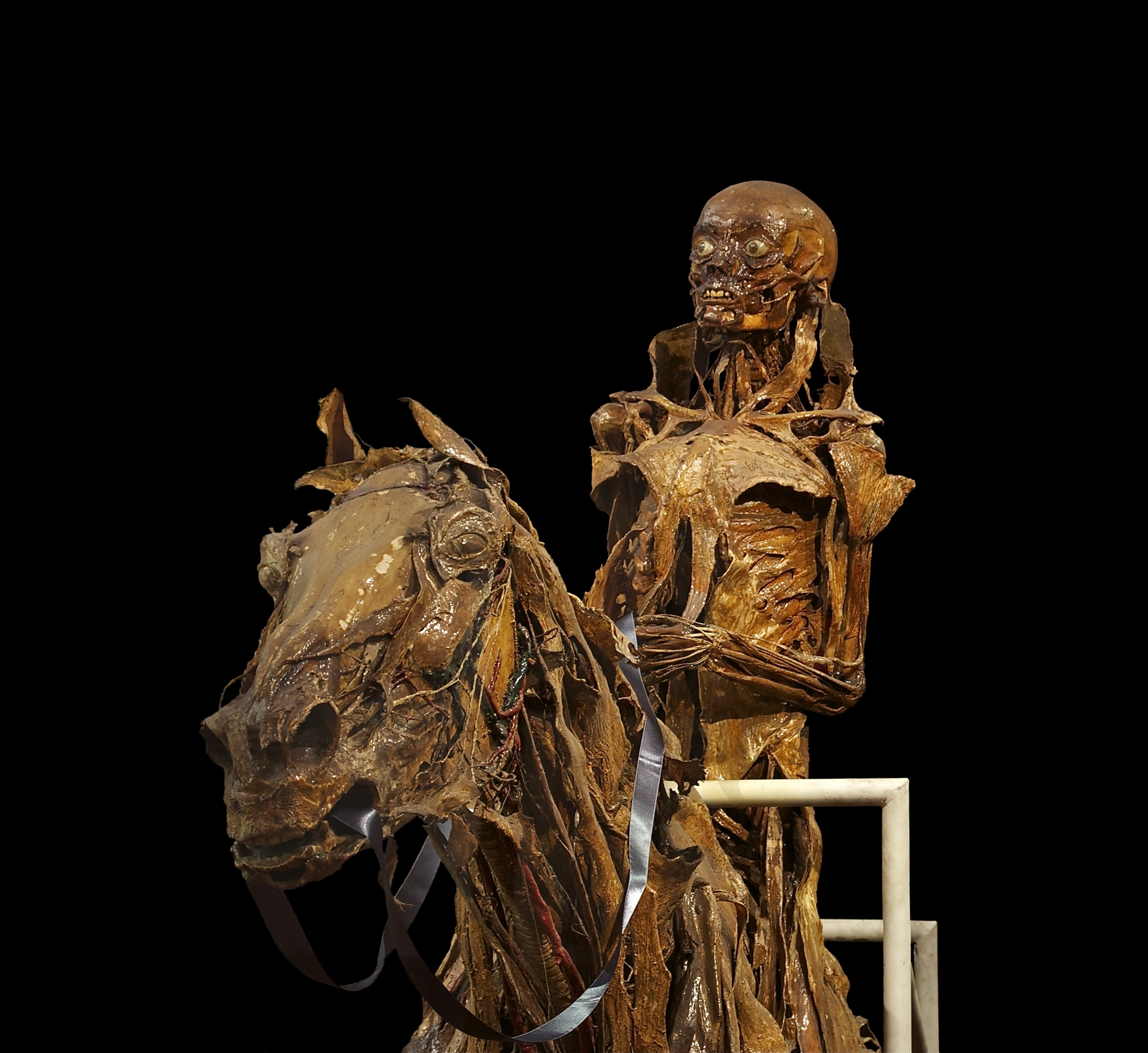
Horseman of the Apocalypse, an écorché of a horse and his rider, made between 1766 and 1771 by Honoré Fragonard.

Honoré Fragonard (French pronunciation: [ɔnɔʁe fʁaɡɔnaʁ]; 13 June 1732 – 5 April 1799) was a French anatomist, now remembered primarily for his remarkable collection of écorchés (flayed figures) in the Musée Fragonard d'Alfort.

Fragonard was born in Grasse as cousin to painter Jean-Honoré Fragonard. After studying surgery, in 1759 he obtained his license and in 1762 was recruited by Claude Bourgelat, founder of the world's first veterinary school in Lyon. There Fragonard began to make his first anatomical exhibits. In 1765 Louis XV initiated a veterinary school in Paris, first resident at rue Sainte Appoline but in 1766 moving to the suburb of Alfort (today the École nationale vétérinaire d'Alfort in Maisons-Alfort). There Fragonard served as the school's first professor of anatomy for six years, preparing thousands of anatomical pieces, but was expelled in 1771 as a madman. His ostentatious specimens were housed among many other objects of natural history and comparative anatomy. He subsequently continued to prepare dissections in his home, gaining income by selling his works to the aristocracy.

Fragonard was careful in his dissections and preserved the results via means never divulged, but which may have been based on those of Jean-Joseph Sue. His pieces were often prepared for theatrical effect rather than scientific exhibition, as can be seen in the surviving pieces in the Musée Fragonard d'Alfort. In 1793, along with his cousin, he became a member of the Jury national des arts, and in the following year the Commission temporaire des arts. In this position he collected his work at Alfort for an envisioned Office national d'anatomie; but it never materialized and most of his work was dispersed. Despondent, he subsequently was named director of anatomy at the newly created École de santé de Paris, but died in Charenton on 5 April 1799.

== Honoré Fragonard in fiction ==
- Honoré Fragonard appears in a brief but important role in Susanne Alleyn's historical mystery novel The Cavalier of the Apocalypse (2009).
- Fragonard is the central character of the French novel Le Cousin de Fragonard (2006) by Patrick Roegiers.
- Fragonard and his Horseman of the Apocalypse figure is mentioned in the novel Austerlitz (2001) by W.G. Sebald. Austerlitz characterizes Fragonard as "moved by a desire to secure for the frail body at least some semblance of eternal life...translating its so readily corruptible substance into a miracle of pure glass."
- Honoré Fragonard is mentioned in Chaosium's Reign of Terror (2017) for having made Comte Fenalik's twisted écorché, the skinless pope. He is also available to the investigators as a resource to translate from Latin at the keepers discretion

== See also ==
- Musée d'Anatomie Delmas-Orfila-Rouvière
- Écorché
- Androtomy
- Plastination
- Frederik Ruysch
