= Jean-Robert Ipoustéguy =

French sculptor (1920–2006)

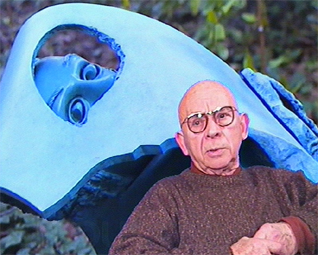
- Ipoustéguy in front of Été 94 (Summer 94, photographed in 1995)
- Born: Jean Robert; January 6, 1920; Dun-sur-Meuse, France
- Died: February 8, 2006 (aged 86); Dun-sur-Meuse, France
- Resting place: Montparnasse Cemetery
- Education: Evening art courses with Robert Lesbounit
- Known for: Sculpture
- Notable work: L'Homme passant la porte (Man passing through the door); La Femme au Bain (Woman in the Bath, 1966)
- Style: Figurative, Abstract, Surreal
- Spouse(s): Geneviève Gilles (1943-??); Françoise Delacouturiere (1963-2006)
- Awards: 1964 Bright Prize, Venice Biennale exhibition 1977 Grand National Prize for Art; 1984 Chevalier de la Légion d'honneur
- Website: ipousteguy.com

Jean-Robert Ipoustéguy (French pronunciation: [ʒɑ̃ʁɔbɛʁ ipusteɡi]; January 6, 1920 – February 8, 2006), a figurative French sculptor, was born Jean Robert in Dun-sur-Meuse. His artwork had a distinct style, combining abstract elements with the human figure, often in the écorché style of French anatomists. The American writer John Updike once wrote that he "may be France's foremost living sculptor, but he is little known in the United States". He and other critics noted sharp contrasts between rough and smooth, abstract and realistic, tender and violent, delicate and crude, and many other paired oppositions in his artwork, and his recurrent themes of sex, birth, growth, decay, death, and resurrection. Ipoustéguy was unafraid to depict emotional intensity in a sometimes controversial way; several of his major commissioned works were rejected, but later installed as planned, or in other locations.

== Early life and education ==
In 1920, Jean-Robert Ipoustéguy was born Jean Robert in Dun-sur-Meuse, between Verdun and Sedan, in the recent aftermath of the ruinous trench warfare of World War I. Jean's father was a joiner, earning a living by producing fine woodwork, who also enjoyed painting, violin playing, and amateur theatrical productions. He also had a great love of reading, which he passed on to his son, who did very well in school. The artist later remembered his father as "soft and sweet", but recalled his mother as being "strict".

As a boy, Ipoustéguy played in the surrounding fields, but as he dug into the earth, he would sense the presence of death beneath him. He harbored a secret ambition to become a painter, but he hid this from his father, who held the profession in low regard.

At the age of 18, Ipoustéguy moved to Paris, where he got a job as a legal clerk and courier. On a winter afternoon in 1938, he saw a poster offering an evening art class taught by Robert Lesbounit, and signed up immediately. The teacher encouraged him to read books far beyond the level of his classmates, and introduced him to a deeper understanding of art history through visits to the Louvre and art galleries. Lesbounit recognized his student's talent, and they would become lifelong friends. At these evening classes, he also met the sculptor known as "Adam" (Henri-Georges Adam).

Art studies were disrupted by World War II and the German invasion of France. Ipoustéguy was mobilized into the French artillery, and relocated to southwest France. Under the Vichy regime, he was assigned as an ironworker and cement worker on the Atlantic Wall and later the submarine base at Bordeaux, incidentally acquiring practical skills he would later use in his artworks. During this difficult period, he produced drawings when he could, such as Soldat endormi (Soldier asleep, 1941) and Sanguine nu de femme (Fiery female nude, 1941). After the Liberation of France, he returned to Paris to resume his art studies with Robert Lesbounit, finishing his evening course of study in 1946.

== Career ==
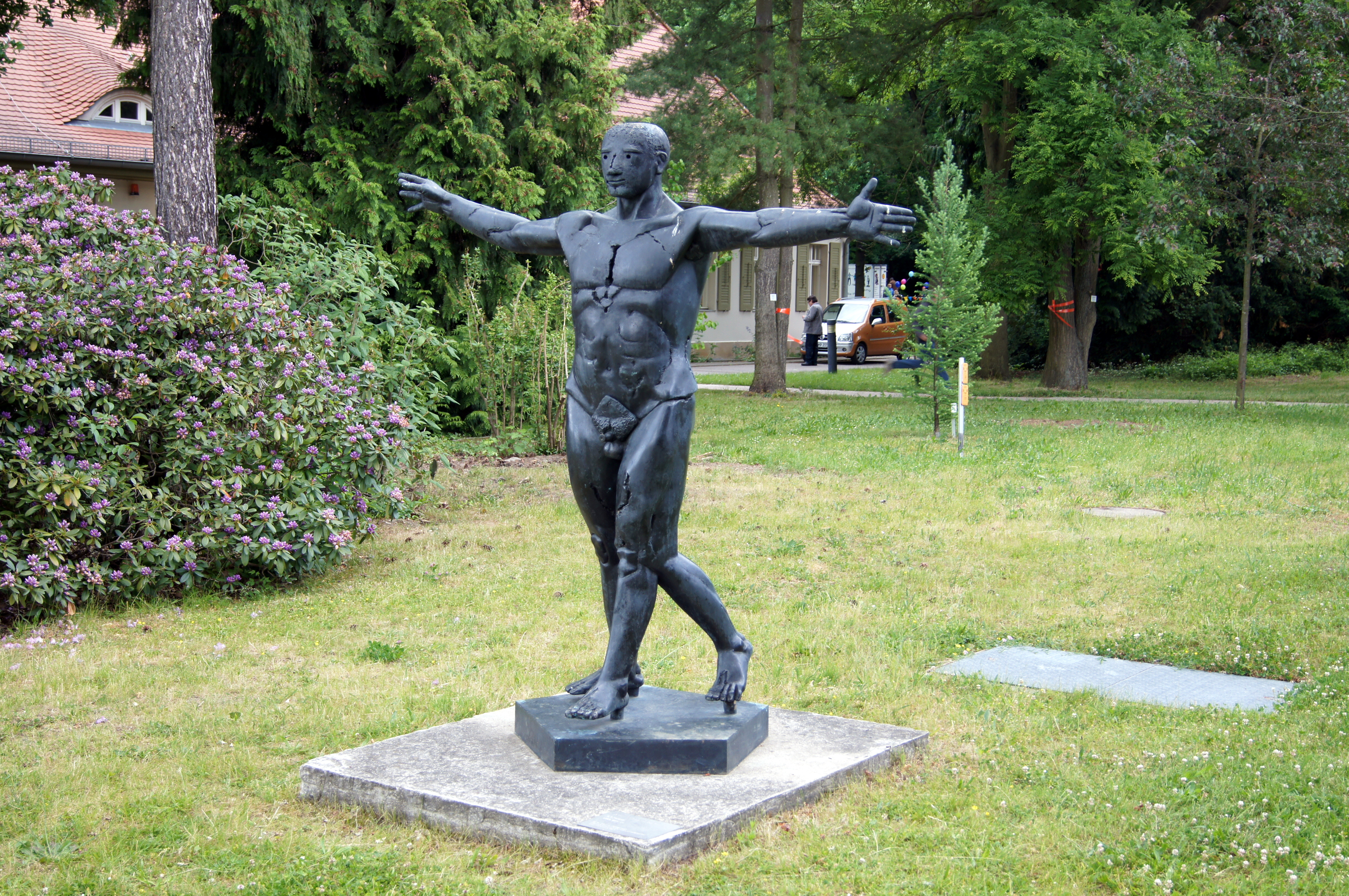
L'homme (1963)

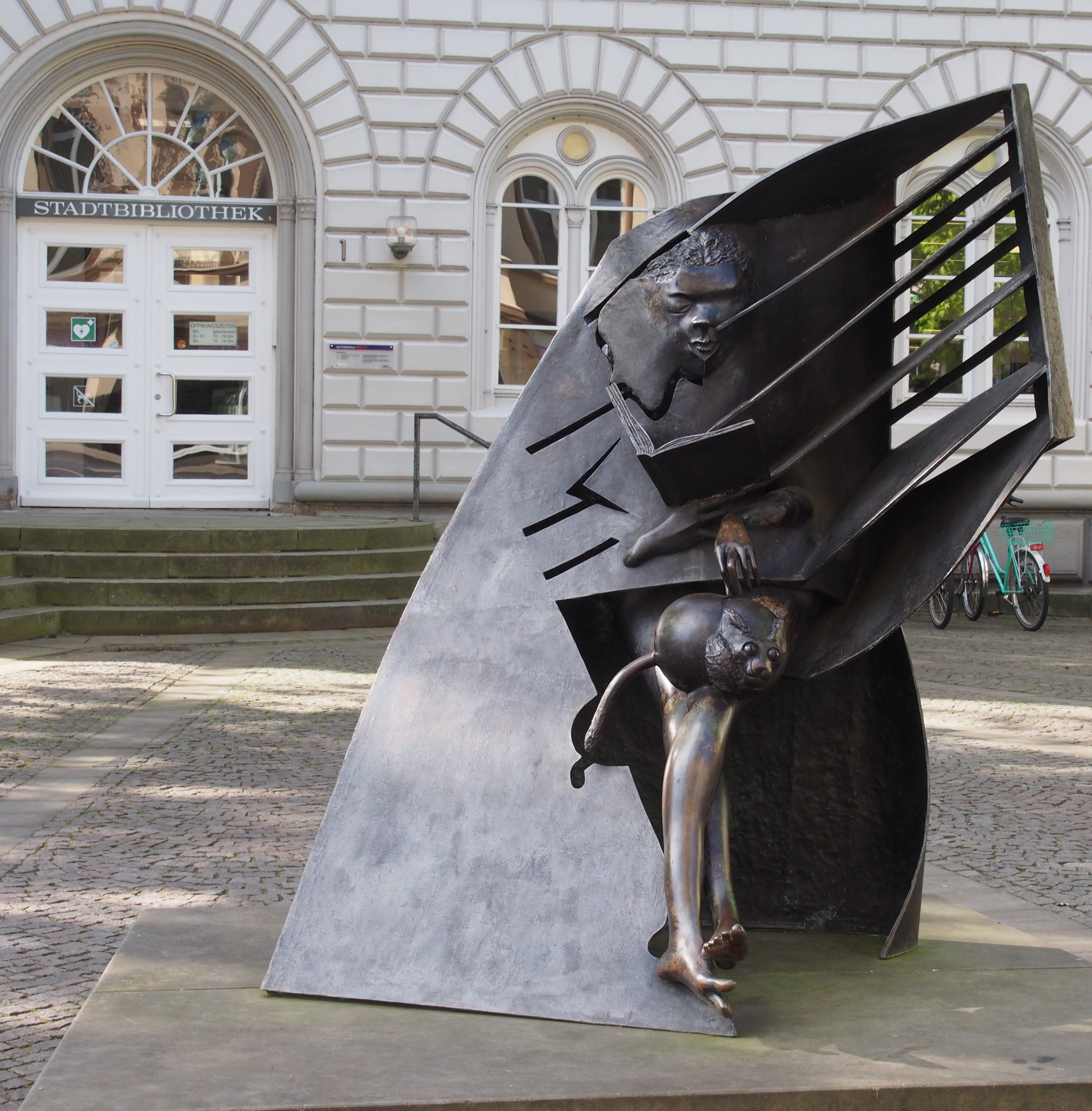
Lecture (1985) combines figurative and abstract elements

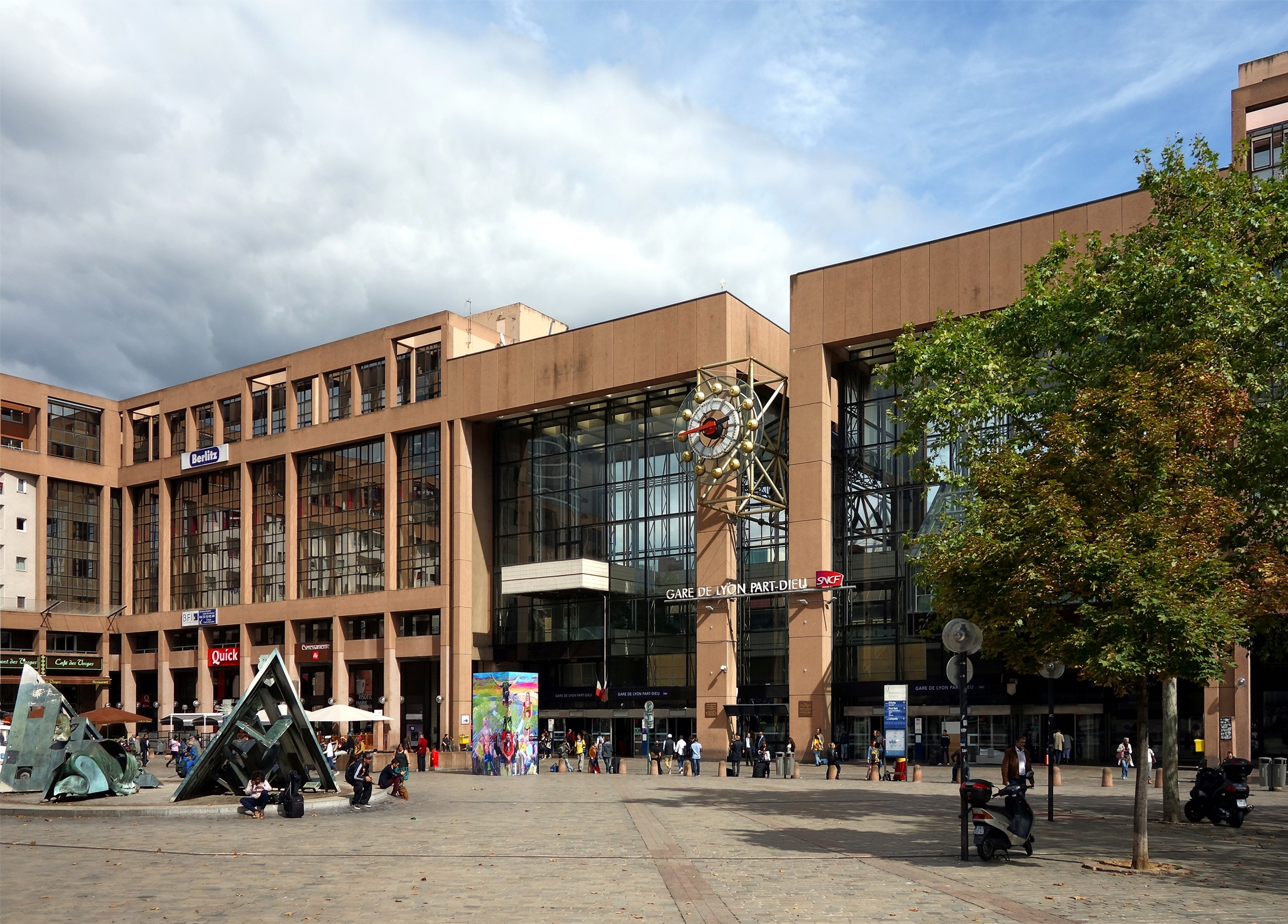
Fontaine Béraudier (1987)

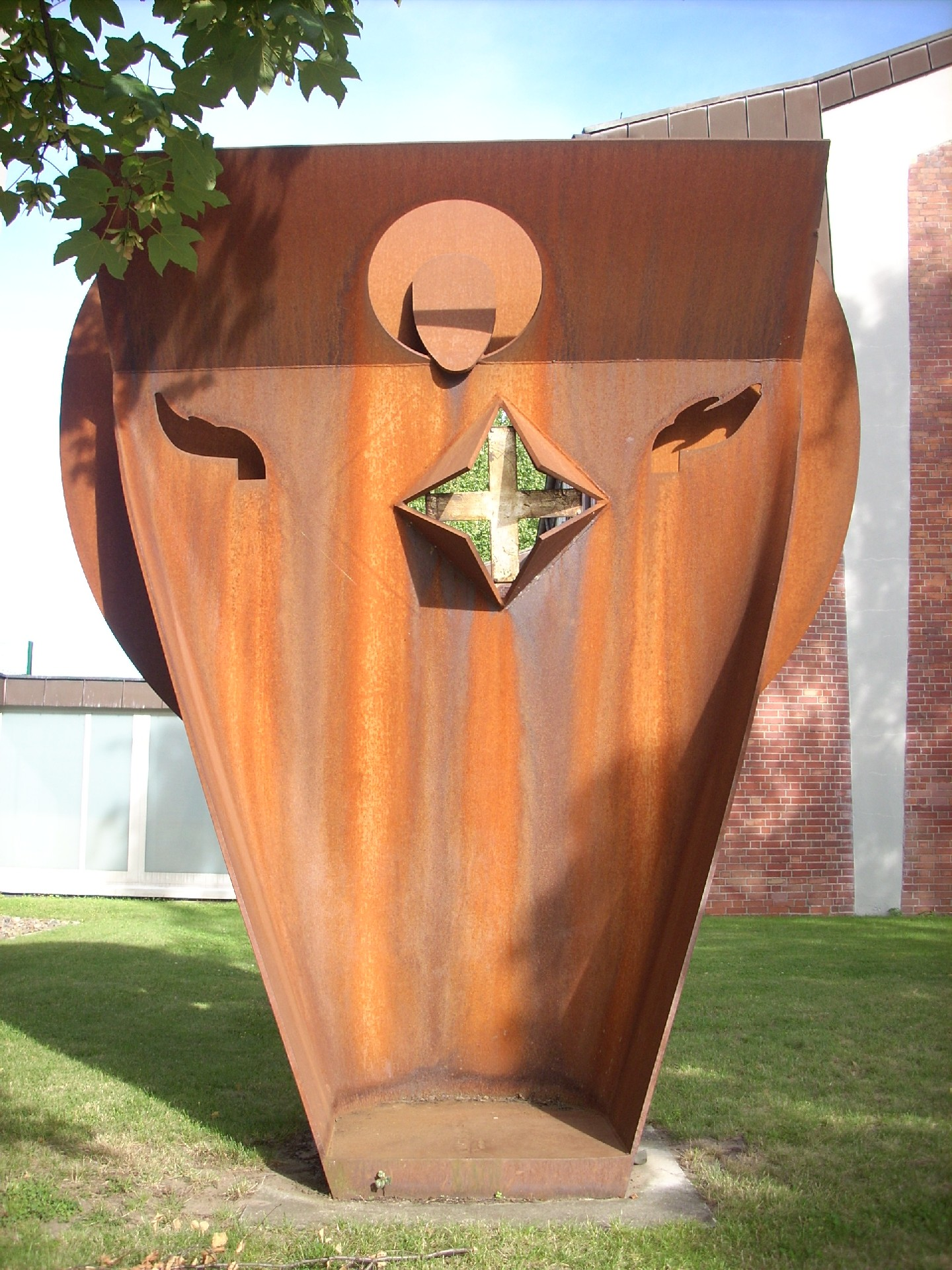
Porte du Ciel (2000)

In 1947-48, he joined a "collective" of teachers and young artists creating frescos and stained glass windows for the church of Saint-Jacques, Petit-Montrouge, Paris.

In 1949, he set up his studio in Choisy-le-Roi, approximately 10 kilometres (6.2 mi) southeast of the center of Paris, and began to work on sculpture. His workspace was in an old ceramics factory, which he gradually took over and converted into a family living space, filled with completed sculpture and works-in-progress.

In the late 1940s and early 1950s, the artist began to append his mother's Basque maiden name, "Ipoustéguy", after his given name, since "Robert" is a very common surname in France.

In 1953, he turned away from oil painting and dedicated himself to the production of sculpture, in spite of a warning from Kahnweiler, his art dealer at the time, that it would not sell. Ipoustéguy continued to produce numerous drawings, watercolors, and writings throughout the remainder of his career. For a few years his sculptures were mostly abstract, and he resisted a temptation to make figurative work which was unfashionable at the time. For example, Cénotaphe (1957) was a purely abstract, geometric artwork, a stainless steel memorial to deceased absence.

Ipoustéguy gradually moved towards figurative work, and some of his early sculptures were abstracted heads in bronze, such as Jeanne d'Arc (Joan of Arc, 1957), Roger Binne (1959), Homme qui rit (Man who laughs, 1960), and Tete de mort (Skull, 1961). A figurative work from this time was Étude de femme (Study of woman, 1959).

In 1962, he established a relationship with the Paris gallery of Claude Bernard, which would last for the rest of his life. Around this time, on a honeymoon trip to Greece, he rediscovered artwork from the 5th century BCE. This was a revelation which inspired the artist to intensify his focus on the nude and the anatomy of the human body. Upon his return, he made La Terre (Earth) and Homme (Man), two large bronze nudes that would characterize his renewed interest in the human figure.

In 1964, he had his first overseas show, at the Albert Loeb Gallery in New York City. His work was recognized and acquired by at least six American museums, and by the Nelson Aldrich Rockefeller Collection in New York.

In 1965, he completed Ecbatane, a major work portraying Alexander the Great contemplating the ancient city of Ecbatana. It was his first work using the novel material polystyrene, which would be cast in bronze using a technique similar to lost-wax casting. The new sculptural medium allowed him to explore increased levels of detail and texture in his work.

In 1966–1967, he returned for a while to figurative painting, mostly in white hues reminiscent of marble, but also produced Homme passant la porte (Man traversing the door) and La femme au bain (Woman in the bath), two masterworks in bronze which would win him wide acclaim.

In August 1967, he went to the Nicoli studio in Carrare, to try his hand at sculpting marble. Within a week, he had completed La grande coude (The great elbow), a flexed arm with bulging muscles and veins.

In February 1968, Ipoustéguy's father died. The sculptor had been working on a white marble commemoration of Pope John XXIII, which he then modified by incorporating images of his deceased father's hands and face into Mort du père (Death of the father). The work became famous for its acquisition by the National Gallery of Victoria in Melbourne, Australia, after a parliamentary debate about the high price it commanded. He also carved the intricate white marble sculpture L'Agonie de la mère (Agony of the mother) to memorialize his mother's recent death from breast cancer.

The May 1968 events in France affected Ipoustéguy, who produced a series of political posters during Le temps des cerises ("The time of the cherries").

In 1968, he also produced Naissance (Birth), in both white marble and polished bronze versions, and Sein tactile (Tactile breast) a white marble sculpture that visually invited sensuous caresses.

In 1970 he produced La brouette (Wheelbarrow), Lune de miel (Honeymoon), and Le calice (Chalice), small, frankly erotic sculptures.

In 1971, he received his first official commission, for Homme forçant l'unitė (Man forcing unity), installed at the Franco-German nuclear physics research center at Grenoble.

In 1975, Ipoustéguy was awarded a major commission from the United States, La mort de l'évêque Neumann (Death of Bishop Neumann), to commemorate John Neumann, the country's first Catholic bishop to be canonized. According to legend, he had collapsed suddenly in the street, dying ignored by all except a little blind girl. Ipoustéguy modeled the girl after his own recently deceased daughter Céline. Upon presentation of the composite white marble and bronze artwork, it was thought to be too violent and emotional, so it was rejected. He also completed Érose en sommeil (Eros in sleep), a complex marble work depicting intertwined hands.

In 1976, he completed Maison (House), a two-piece polished bronze showing a frank heterosexual coupling as the framework and foundation of the domestic environment, and the boldly anatomical abstract Triptyche. He also produced Petit écorché (Little flayed one) and Scène comique de la vie moderne (Comic scene of modern life), both depicting frantic figures; the latter one was later displayed clutching a real red-colored telephone.

In 1977, he received a commission from the Val-de-Grâce hospital; the namesake bronze sculpture was rejected twice, before being accepted and installed in the new hospital entry rotunda. The sculpture shows a standing nude figure, apparently shedding an anguished skin or shell, and supported by robust tubular elements.

In 1978, he had a retrospective show at the Fondation Nationale des Arts Graphiques et Plastiques (National Foundation of Graphic and Plastic Arts) in Paris.

In 1979, he had a retrospective show at the Kunsthalle in Berlin, featuring 242 of his artworks. The same year, his largest sculpture, L'homme construit sa ville (Man builds his city), was installed at the Congress Centre in Berlin.

In 1982 Louise Labé, at Place Louis Pradel in Lyon

In 1985 L'homme aux semelles devant (à Rimbaud) (Man with soles in front, to Rimbaud), in Paris

In 1989 A la santé de la Révolution (To the health of the Revolution) in Bagnolet (France)

In 1991, Nicolas Appert in Châlons en Champagne (France)

In 1998, he produced Âge des interrogations and Âge des conclusions, reflections on approaching mortality.

In 1999, Porte du Ciel (Door of the Sky), Braunschweig (Germany)

In 2001 Ipoustéguy installed his sculpture La mort de l'évêque Neumann (cast in 1976), which had been rejected by the Americans almost a quarter-century earlier. He placed it in the church of Dun-sur-Meuse, near his birthplace. That same year, a catalogue raisonné of his artworks was published by Éditions la Différence. A new Centre culturel Ipoustéguy (Ipoustéguy Cultural Center) was opened in the town of his birth, featuring dozens of artworks donated by the artist.

In 2003 he returned to Dun-sur-Meuse, settling a few hundred meters from the house where he was born, and near the Centre culturel Ipoustéguy.

Ipoustéguy died in 2006, at the age of 86. He is buried at Cimetière de Montparnasse, Paris, in a tomb which features one of his sculptures.

His first posthumous retrospective exhibition was at the Palazzo Leone da Perego, in Legnano, Italy (October 2008 to February 2009). Throughout his career, he had produced many paintings in oil, watercolor, and gouache, and many drawings in charcoal, some of which were displayed alongside his sculptural work.

== Artistic style ==
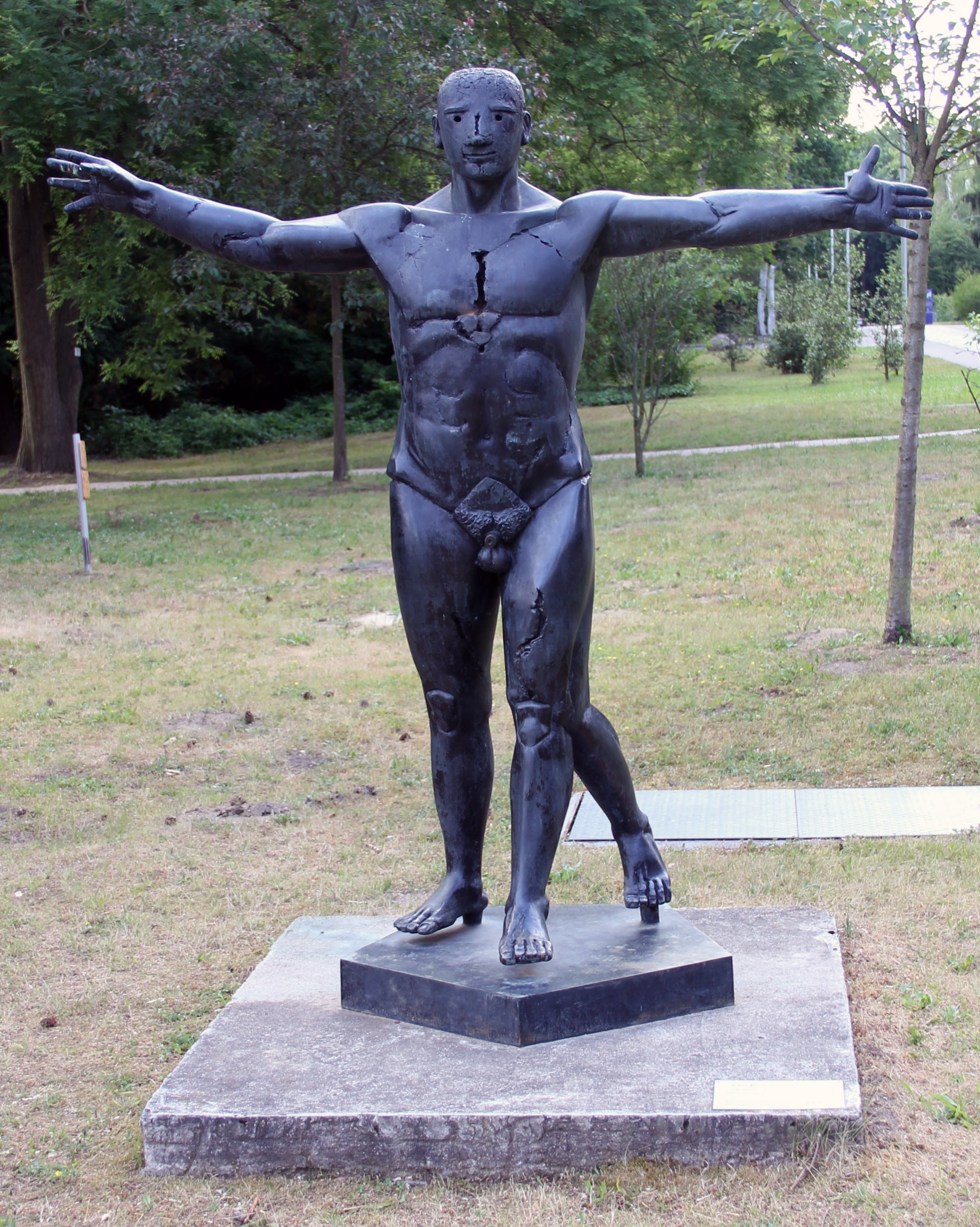
L'Homme (1963) depicts a nude figure standing on three legs

Ipoustéguy's early sculptural work was mostly abstract, but starting around 1959 his work focused on the human figure (either complete or in anatomical fragments), often combined with abstract elements. His figures often show aspects of the écorché style used by French anatomists, with layers of skin and muscle partially dissected. Ipoustéguy's prime work often emphasizes contrasts between smooth finishes and a roughness of "decay or willful destruction". Ipoustéguy has remarked: J'ai cassé l'oeuf de Brancusi ("I broke Brancusi's egg"). He could skillfully render the textures of fragile materials such as cloth or paper in his favored sculptural media, durable stone and bronze.

Ipoustéguy's sculptures often depict multiple points of view or points in time simultaneously, resulting in human figures with three arms, three legs, or multiple profiles. Secondary elements may be bodily shells or carapaces, sometimes mounted on hinges. His work was influenced by Surrealism, freely combining realistic elements with the fantastical, and focusing on social issues, sex, birth, growth, decay, death, and resurrection as major themes. The frankness and uncensored directness of some of his artistic output led to objections from a few religious and political groups; nevertheless, his work is displayed at French embassies and major museums throughout the world.

Despite his focus on the human figure, Ipoustéguy also produced large abstract sculptures, such as Sun, Moon, Heaven (1999).

Ipoustéguy also wrote extensively throughout his life, and granted many interviews, but relatively little has been translated into English.

== Personal life ==
In his prime, Ipoustéguy was a sturdy, squat, stocky ("trapu") man, with strong arms and hands, and was often photographed working bare-chested.

He married Geneviève Gilles in 1943, and they had a son, Dominique, in 1945.

In 1963, he married Françoise Delacouturiere, producing two daughters, Céline (1965) and Marie-Pierre (1969).

In the late 1960s, his art took a more somber turn, affected by the deaths of both his parents and some of his friends. He memorialized his father in La mort du père (Death of the father, 1968), and his mother's death from breast cancer in L'Agonie de la mère (Agony of the mother, 1968). The theme of mortality became more prominent in his work.

In November 1974, he learned via telephone that his 10-year-old daughter Céline had died suddenly, a brutal shock which caused him to abandon work for a time.

At his death in 2006, he was survived by Françoise Robert (his second wife), and by his children Dominique and Marie-Pierre. They are credited with helping to support a posthumous retrospective exhibition at the Palazzo Leone da Perego, in Legnano, Italy.

== Prizes, awards, and honors ==
- 1964, Bright Prize, Venice Biennale exhibition
- 1977, Grand National Prize for Art
- 1984, Chevalier de la Légion d'honneur
- 2003, Prix de la sculpture de la Fondation Simone et Cino Del Duca.

== Museums and public art collections ==
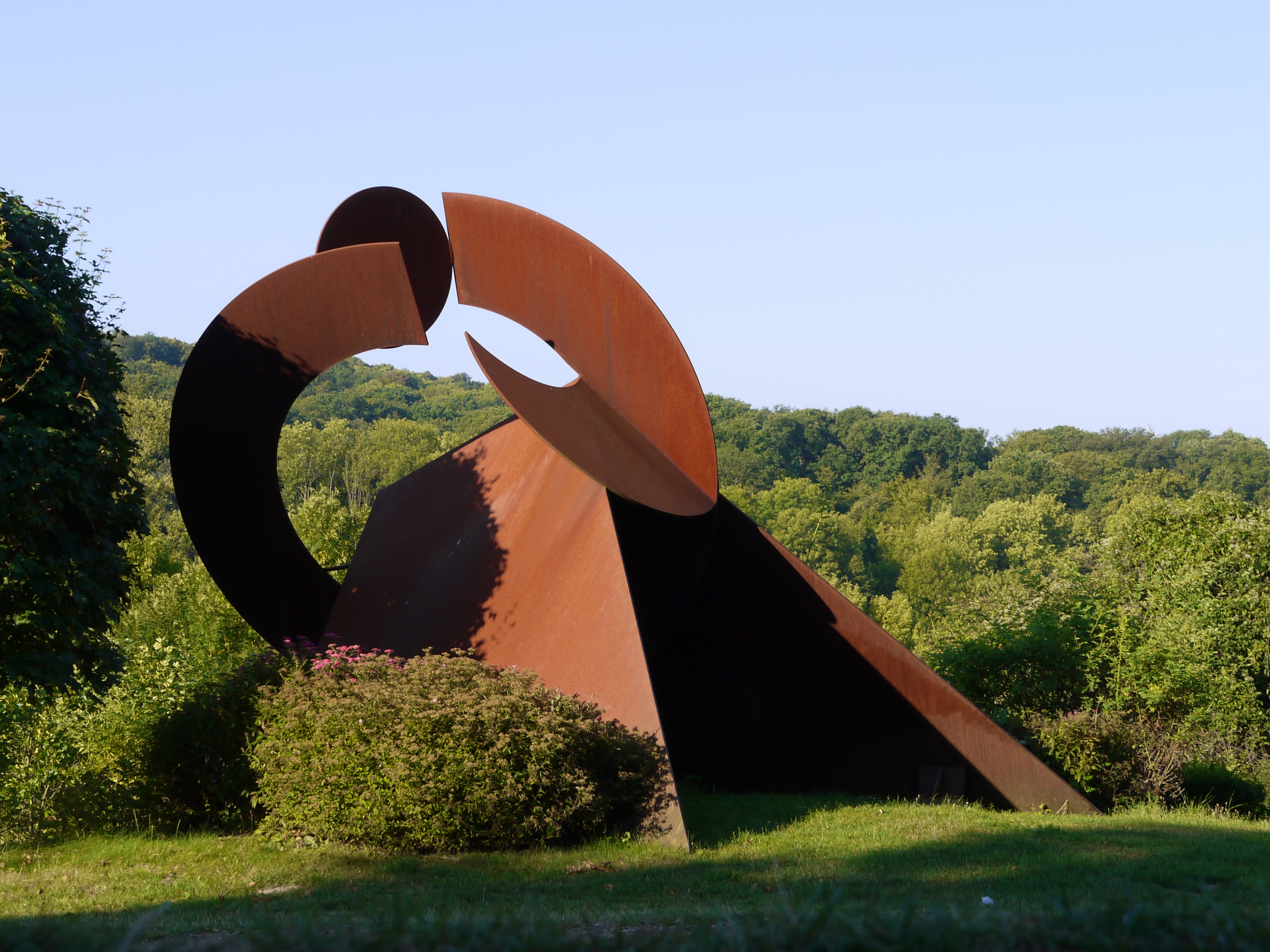
Sun, Moon, Heaven (1999)

Abu Dhabi, National Museum of Saadiyat Island.

Baltimore, Baltimore Museum of Art.

Berlin, Nationalgalerie.

Bobigny, Fonds Départemental d’Art Contemporain.

Cambridge, Massachusetts, US (Massachusetts Institute of Technology, MIT) — Cénotaphe (1957)

Châlons en Champagne, Musée des Beaux-Arts et d'Archéologie.

Chicago, Art Institute.

Copenhagen, Carlsberg Glyptotek.

Darmstadt, Hessiches Landesmuseum.

Dun sur Meuse, Centre Ipoustéguy

Evanston, Illinois, Mary and Leigh Block Museum of Art

Grenoble, Musée d’Art Moderne.

Hannover, Sprengel Museum.

London, Tate.

London, Victoria and Albert Museum.

Lyon, Musée des Beaux-Arts.

Marseille, Musée Cantini.

Melbourne, National Gallery of Victoria.

New York, The Museum of Modern Art.

New York, Solomon R. Guggenheim Museum of Art.

Paris, Musée d’Art Moderne de la Ville de Paris.

Paris, Musée de la Sculpture en Plein Air.

Pittsburgh, The Carnegie Museum.

Tokyo, Hakone Museum of Art.

Toulouse, Artothèque.

Troyes, Musée d’Art Moderne.

Washington, Hirshhorn Museum and Sculpture Garden – L'Homme passant la porte "Man traversing the door" (sometimes identified as L'Homme poussant la porte, "Man pushing the door")

L'Homme passant la porte (1966)

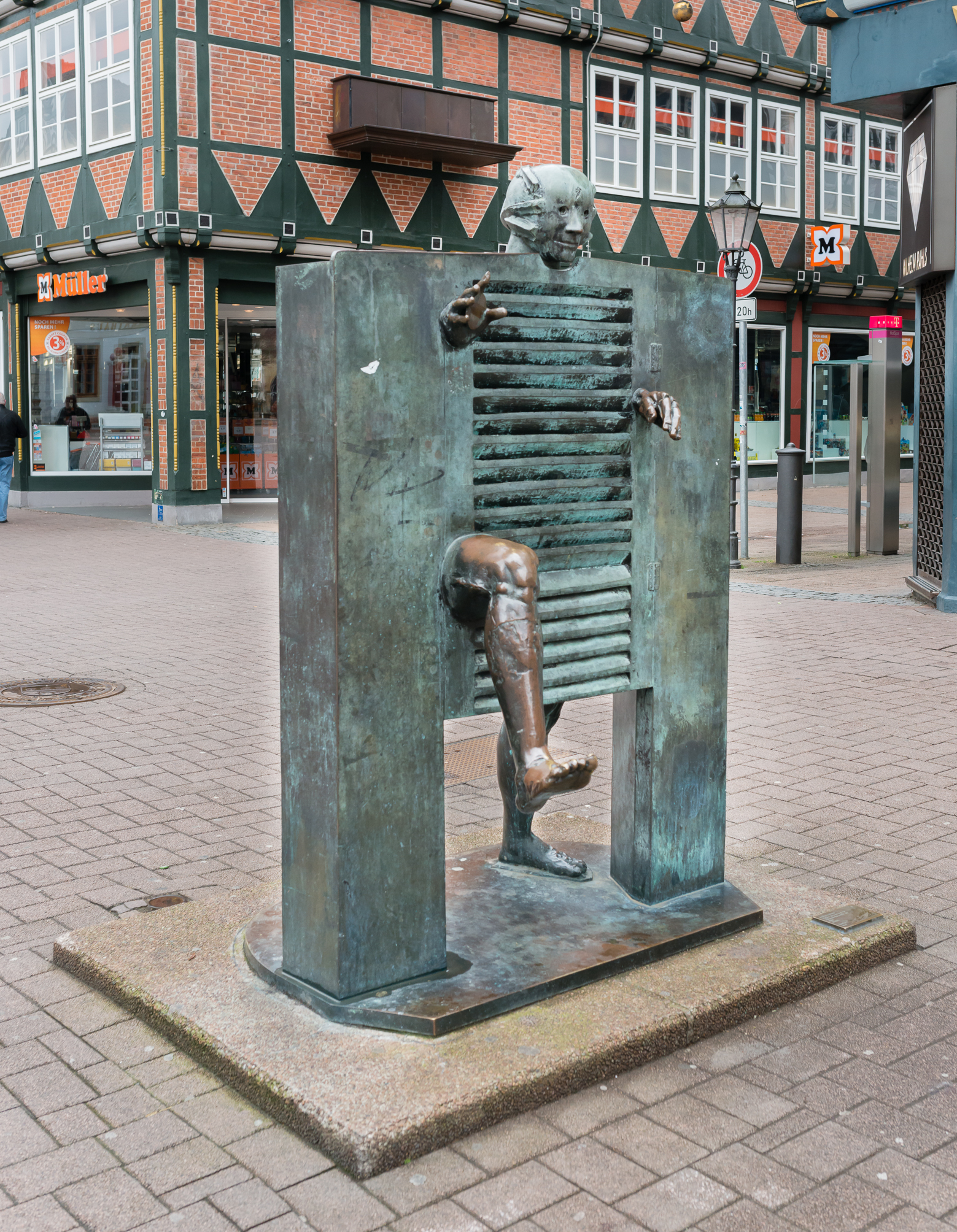

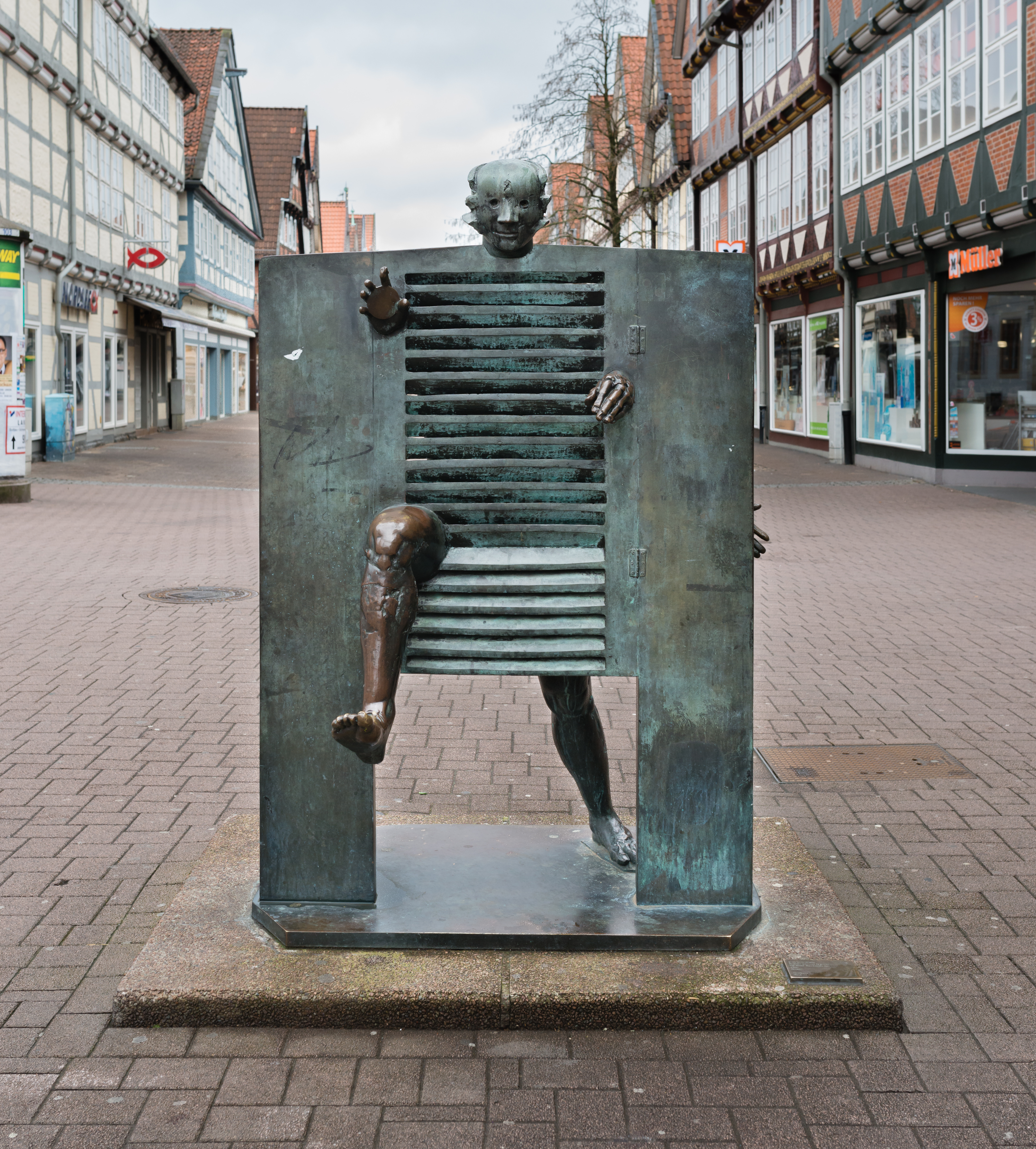

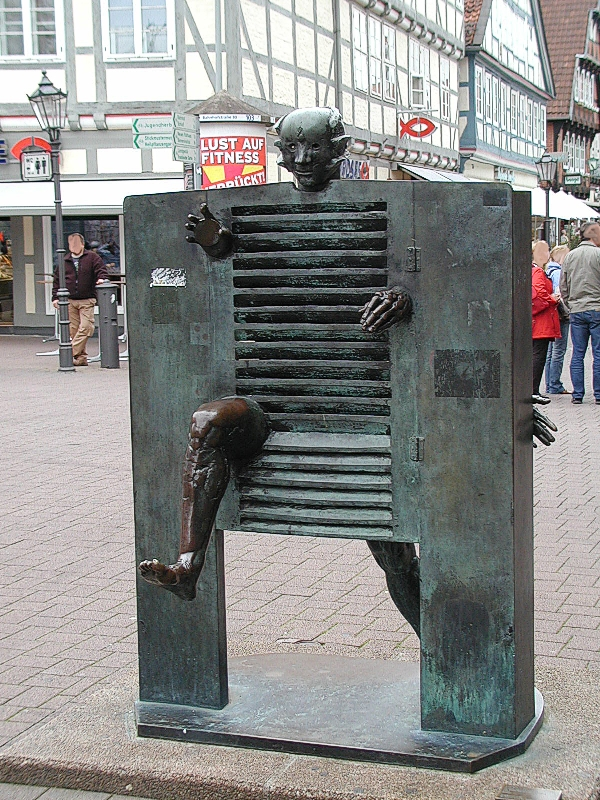

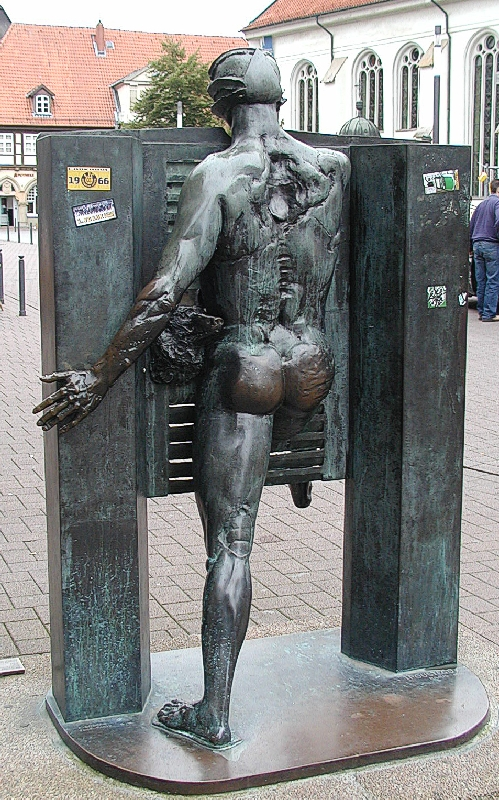
A la santé de la Révolution (1989)

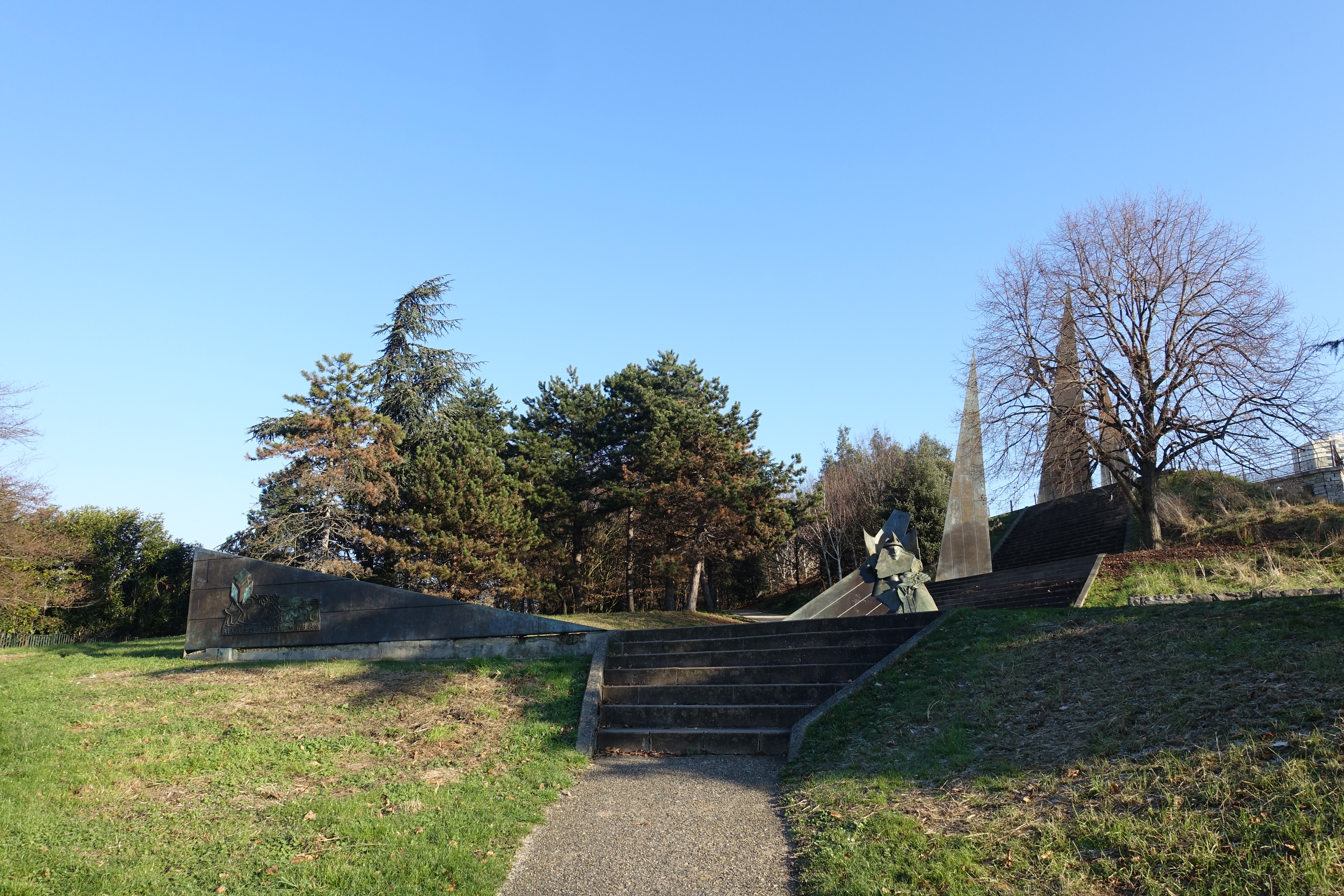

== See also ==
- Gunther von Hagens – German anatomist and artist who creates écorché style exhibits using plastination of real cadavers
