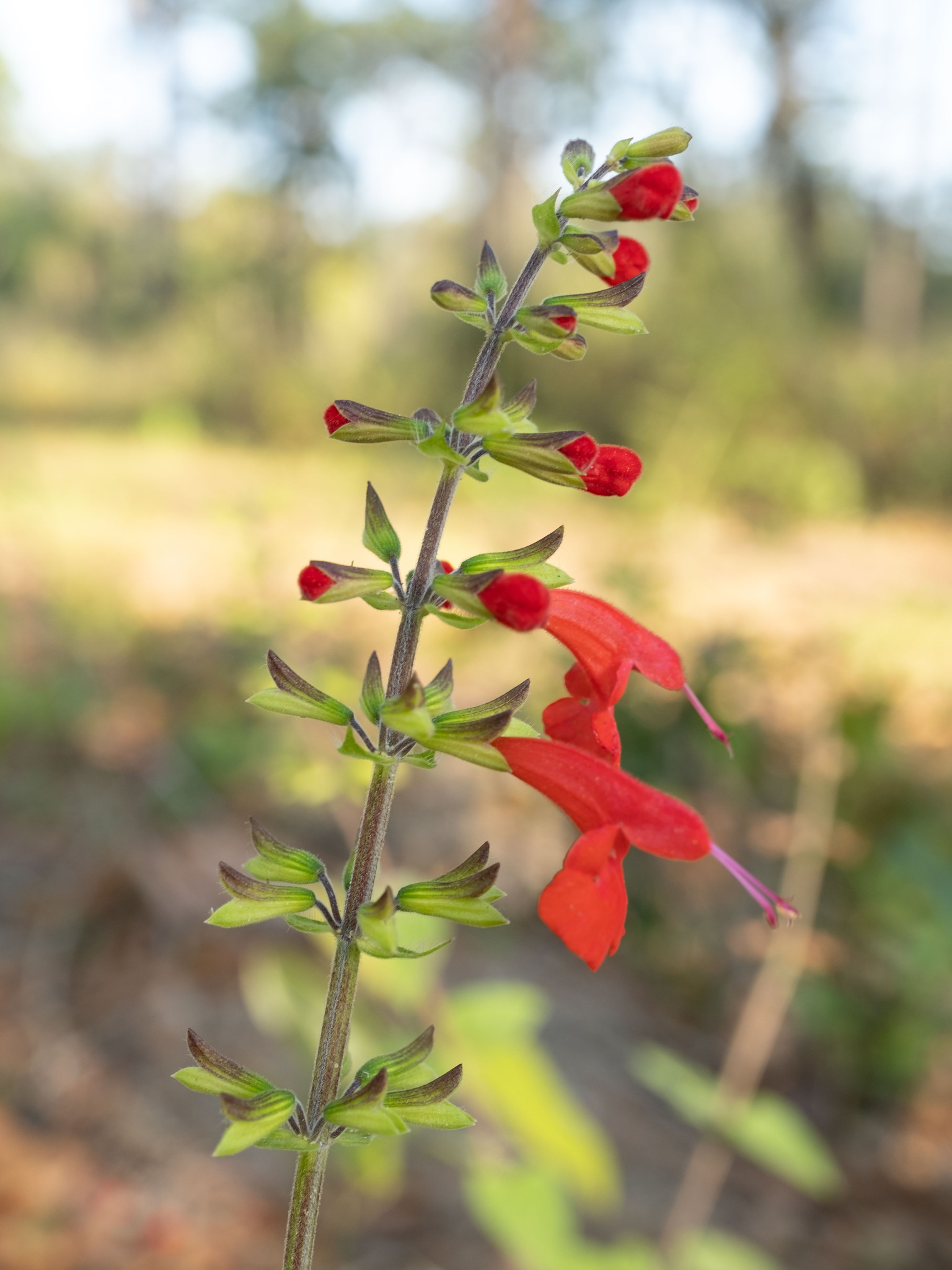

Scientific classification
- Kingdom: Plantae
- Clade: Tracheophytes
- Clade: Angiosperms
- Clade: Eudicots
- Clade: Asterids
- Order: Lamiales
- Family: Lamiaceae
- Genus: Salvia
- Species: S. coccinea

Binomial name
- Salvia coccinea Buc'hoz ex Etl.

= Salvia coccinea =

Species of plant

Salvia coccinea, the blood sage, scarlet sage, Texas sage, or tropical sage, is a herbaceous perennial in the family Lamiaceae that is widespread throughout the Southeastern United States, Mexico, Central America, the Caribbean, and northern South America (Colombia, Peru, and Brazil). At one time Brazil was considered to be where it originated, but its diploid chromosome count now points to Mexico as its place of origin.

== Taxonomy ==
Its specific epithet, coccinea, means "scarlet-dyed" (Latin), referring to the color of its flowers.

== Description ==
The plant reaches 2 to 4 ft (0.61 to 1.22 m) in height, with many branches, and a spread of about 2.5 ft (0.76 m). The hairy leaves, scalloped on the edges, are pea green, varying in size, all the way up to 3 in (7.6 cm) long and 2 in (5.1 cm) wide. Flower color and size is quite variable. The naturalized variety is typically tubular, bright red, about 1.25 in (3.2 cm) long. Flowers are pollinated by hummingbirds and butterflies.

== Cultivation ==
Salvia coccinea is commonly grown as an annual species. It is cultivated in urban green areas as well as in private gardens around the world. It has a long flowering period, from the start of summer to the end of autumn. Cultivated varieties include orange-red, pink, salmon, red, white, and scarlet, as well as bi-colored varieties. The plant can survive winter in USDA Hardiness Zones Zones 8–10.
