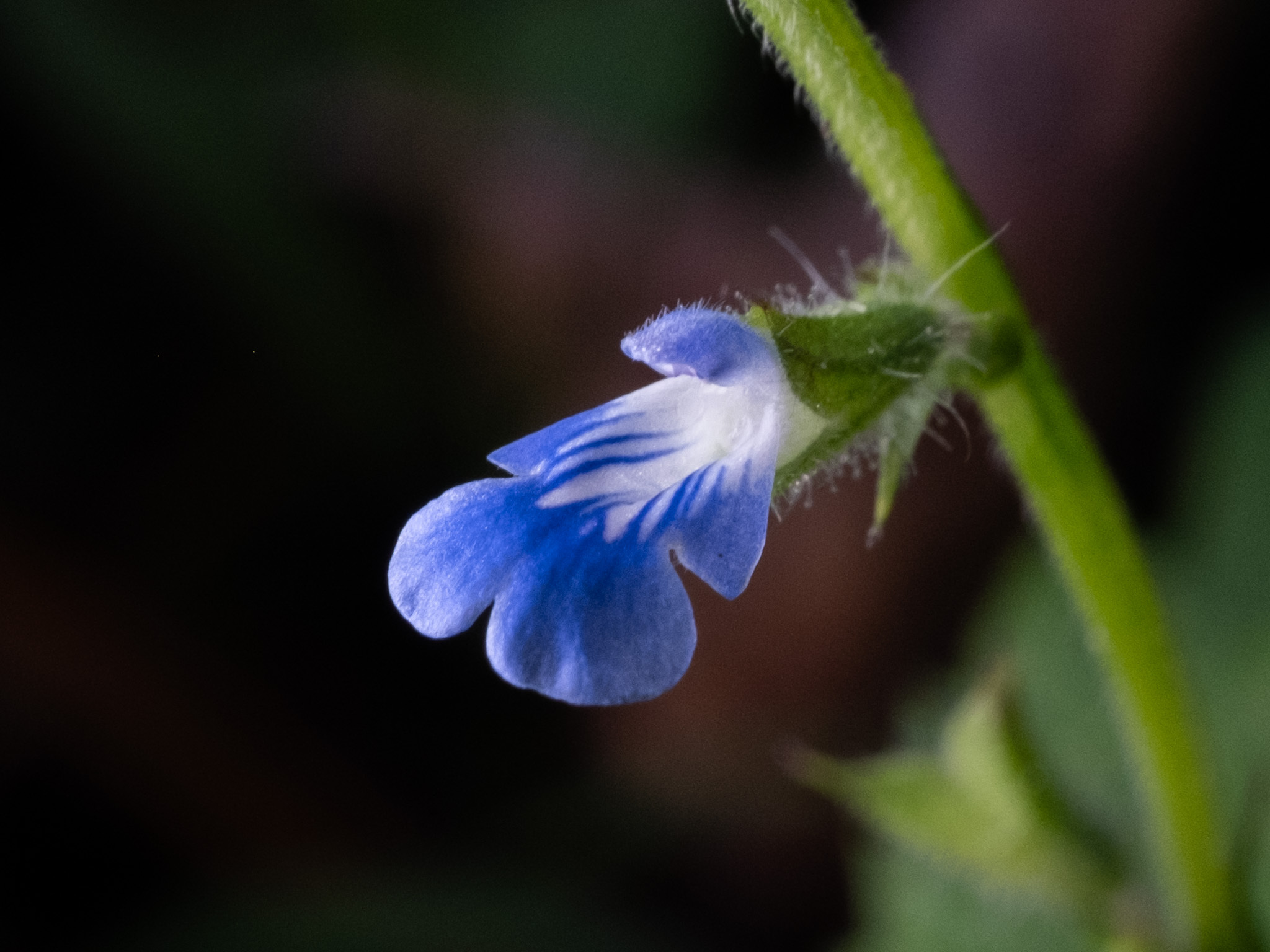

Scientific classification
- Kingdom: Plantae
- Clade: Tracheophytes
- Clade: Angiosperms
- Clade: Eudicots
- Clade: Asterids
- Order: Lamiales
- Family: Lamiaceae
- Genus: Salvia
- Species: S. misella

Binomial name
- Salvia misella Kunth

Synonyms
- Salvia riparia Kunth

= Salvia misella =

Species of herb

Salvia misella, commonly known as tropical sage, is an annual herb growing throughout tropical America, often found in semi-arid regions on disturbed bushy ground, from sea level to 2,200 metres (7,200 ft). It is similar and perhaps closely related to Salvia occidentalis, with a longer calyx (7 millimetres (0.28 in)) and a 5 millimetres (0.20 in) blue flower.
