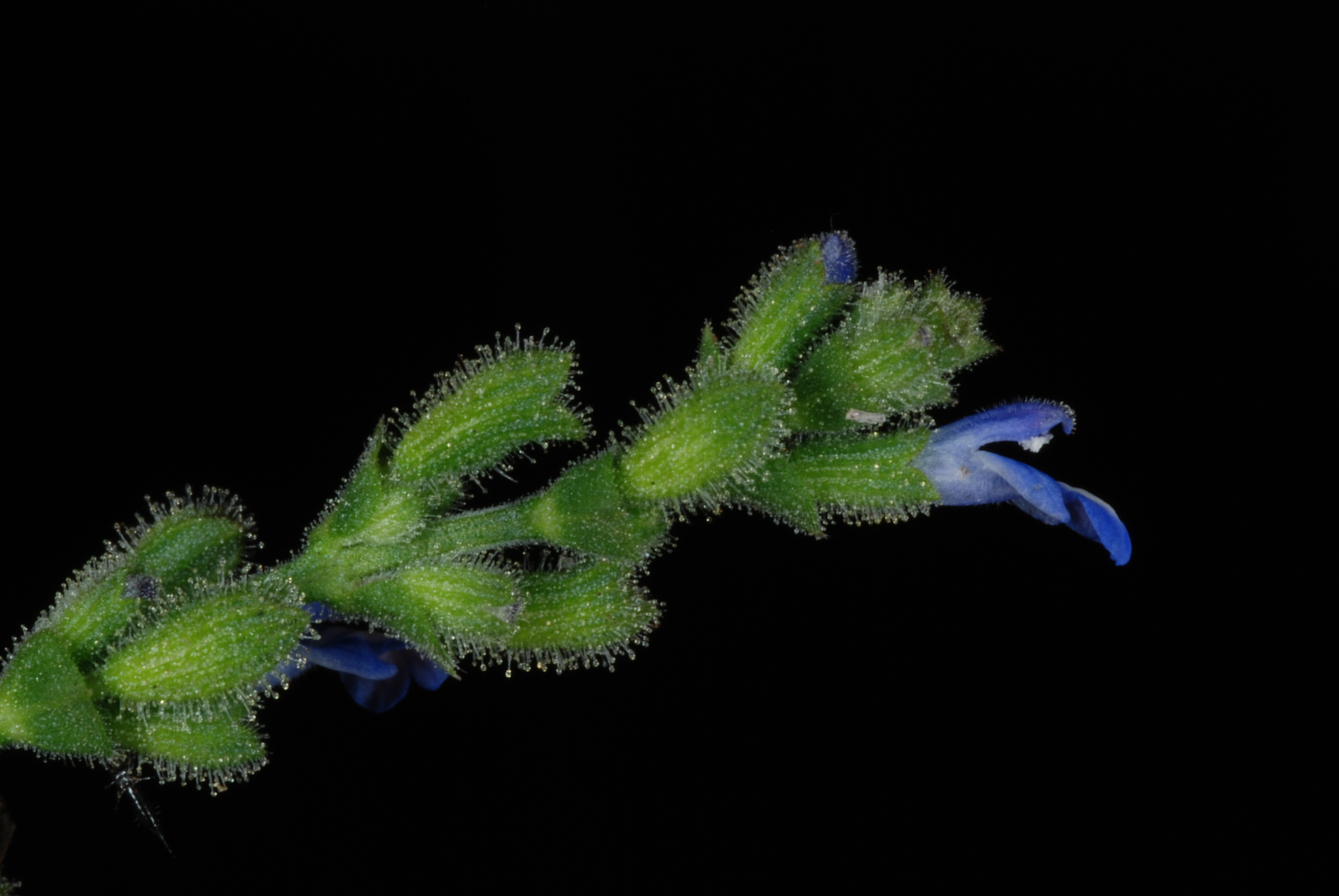

Scientific classification
- Kingdom: Plantae
- Clade: Tracheophytes
- Clade: Angiosperms
- Clade: Eudicots
- Clade: Asterids
- Order: Lamiales
- Family: Lamiaceae
- Genus: Salvia
- Species: S. occidentalis

Binomial name
- Salvia occidentalis Sw.

= Salvia occidentalis =

Species of herb

Salvia occidentalis, the West Indian sage, is a small annual herb native to the Caribbean, Mexico, and South America

The herb typically growing in damp bushy areas between 50 and 1,300 m (160 and 4,270 ft) elevation. It bears 4 millimetres (0.16 in) long pale pink flowers.
