= Reciprocal cross =

Breeding experiment in genetics

In genetics, a reciprocal cross is a breeding experiment designed to test the role of parental sex on a given inheritance pattern. All parent organisms must be true breeding to properly carry out such an experiment. In one cross, a male expressing the trait of interest will be crossed with a female not expressing the trait. In the other, a female expressing the trait of interest will be crossed with a male not expressing the trait. It is the cross that could be made either way or independent of the sex of the parents.

For example, suppose a biologist wished to identify whether a hypothetical allele Z, a variant of some gene A, is on the male or female sex chromosome. They might first cross a Z-trait female with an A-trait male and observe the offspring. Next, they would cross an A-trait female with a Z-trait male and observe the offspring. Via principles of dominant and recessive alleles, they could then (perhaps after cross-breeding the offspring as well) make an inference as to which sex chromosome contains the gene Z, if either in fact did.

== Reciprocal cross in practice ==
Given that the trait of interest is either autosomal or sex-linked and follows by either complete dominance or incomplete dominance, a reciprocal cross following two generations will determine the mode of inheritance of the trait.

=== White-eye mutation in Drosophila melanogaster ===
Sex linkage was first reported by Doncaster and Raynor in 1906 who studied the inheritance of a colour mutation in a moth, Abraxas grossulariata. Thomas Hunt Morgan later showed that a new white-eye mutation in Drosophila melanogaster was also sex-linked. He found that a white-eyed male crossed with a red-eyed female produced only red-eyed offspring. However, when they crossed a red-eyed male with a white-eyed female, the male offspring had white eyes while the female offspring had red eyes. The reason was that the white eye allele is sex-linked (more specifically, on the X chromosome) and recessive.

The analysis can be more easily shown with Punnett squares:

Table 1. Wild-type Male x Mutant Female ( X(wt)Y x X(mut)X(mut))
	X (mut)	X (mut)
X (wt)	X (mut) X (wt) Red eye Female	X (mut) X (wt) Red eye Female
Y	X (mut) Y White eye Male	X (mut) Y White eye Male

Table 2. Mutant Male x Wild-type Female ( X(mut)Y x X(wt)X(wt) )
	X (wt)	X (wt)
X (mut)	X (mut) X (wt) Red eye Female	X (mut) X (wt) Red eye Female
Y	X (wt) Y Red eye Male	X (wt) Y Red eye Male

As shown in Table 1, the male offspring are white-eyed and the female offspring are red-eyed. The female offspring are carrying the mutant white-eye allele X(mut), but do not express it phenotypically because it is recessive. Although the males carry only one mutant allele like the females, the X-chromosome takes precedence over the Y and the recessive phenotype is shown.

As shown in Table 2, all offspring are Red-eyed. The males are free of the mutation. The females however, are carriers.
