= Écorché =

Drawing of a person that shows their muscles under the skin

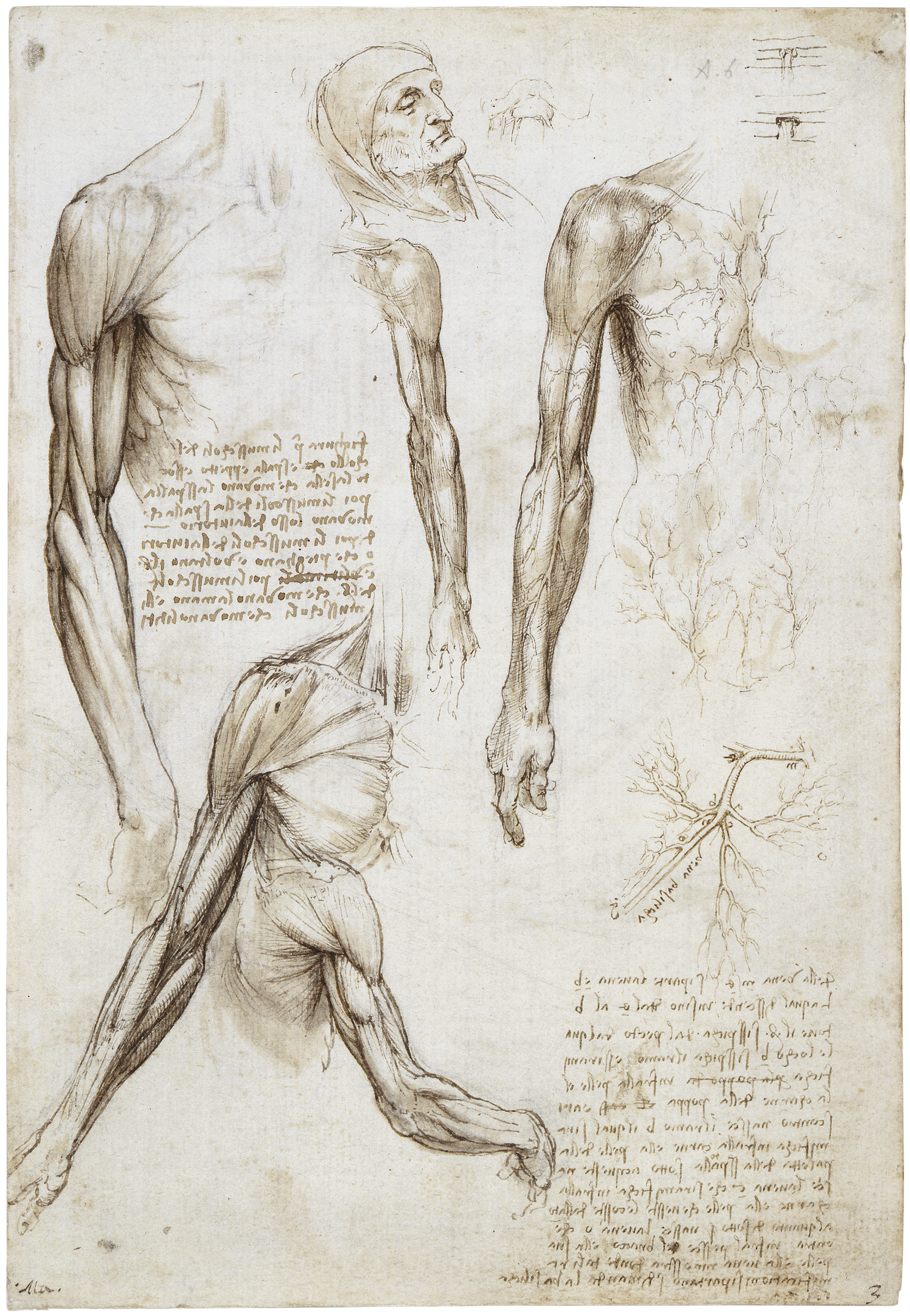
Écorché by Leonardo da Vinci.

An écorché (French pronunciation: [ekɔʁʃe]) is a figure drawn, painted, or sculpted showing the muscles of the body without skin, normally as a figure study for another work or as an exercise for a student artist. The architect and Renaissance man Leon Battista Alberti recommended that when painters intend to depict a nude, they should first arrange the muscles and bones, then depict the overlying skin.

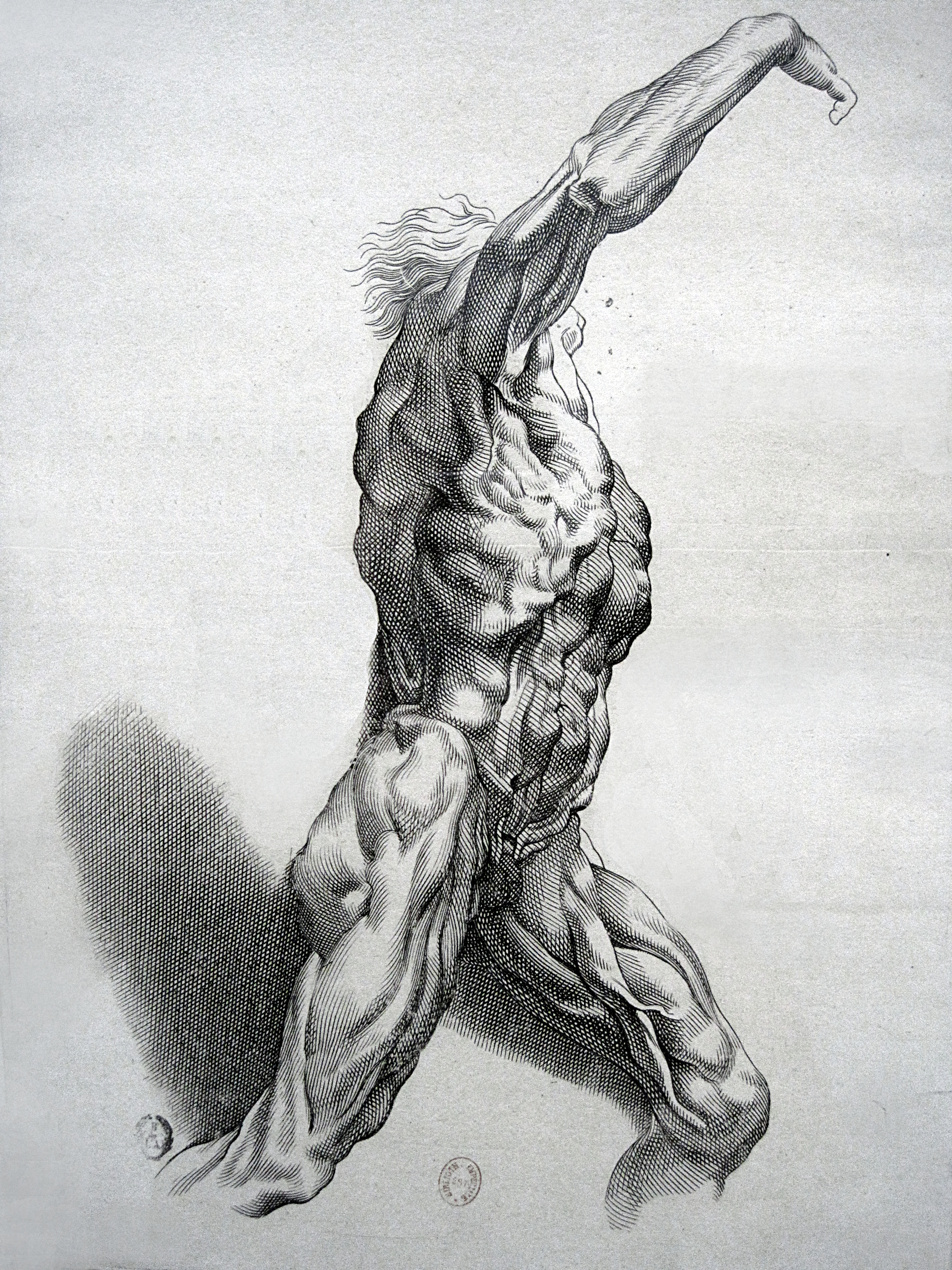
Écorchéchisel (H. 33 cm. L 21.8 cm) realized after Peter Paul Rubens after 1640 by Paulus Pontius. - Engraving No. SNR - 3 PONTIUS. Photograph taken during the exhibition Rubens Europe - Louvre Museum .

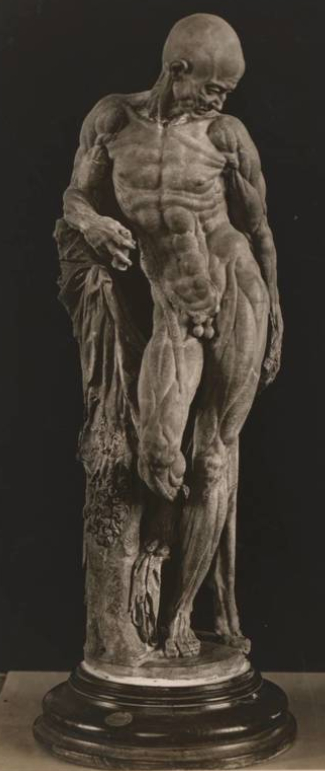
Terracotta Anatomical study by Willem van den Broecke,1563

Some of the first well known studies of this kind were performed by Leonardo da Vinci, who dissected cadavers and created detailed drawings of them. However, there are some accounts of this same practice taking place as far back as ancient Greece, though the specifics are not known.

== Etymology ==
The term écorché, meaning "flayed", came into usage via the French Academies (such as the École des Beaux Arts) in the 19th century.

== History ==
Although there are some accounts of practices similar to écorché as far back as ancient Greece, the degree of similarity is unclear. The term as used today can be applied with the greatest confidence to the Renaissance period onwards.

=== Renaissance ===
During the Renaissance in Italy, around 1450 to 1600, the renewed interest in classical Greek and Roman art styles led to the study of the human anatomy. Human dissection had been banned for many centuries due to the belief that body and soul were inseparable. It was not until the election of Pope Boniface VIII that the practice of dissection was permitted for medical observation.

Many painters and artists scrupulously documented and even performed dissections themselves. Among them were Leonardo da Vinci and Andreas Vesalius, two of the most influential artists in anatomical illustrations. Leonardo da Vinci, in particular, was so detailed in his studies that he was known as the “artist-anatomist” and the foremost pioneer of the depiction of anatomy. Leonardo’s anatomical studies contributed to artistic exploration of the movement of the muscles, joints and bones. His goal was to analyze and understand the instruments behind the postures and gestures in the human body.

=== 17th–19th centuries ===
The study of anatomical figures became popular among the medical academies across Europe around the 17th and 18th century, especially when there was a lack of bodies available for dissections. Medical students relied on these figures because they provided a good representation of what the anatomical model looks like. The écorché (flayed) figures were made to look like the skin was removed from the body, exposing the muscles and vessels of the model. Some figures were created to strip away the layers of muscles and reveal the skeleton of the model. Many of the life-size scale écorché figures were reproduced in a smaller scale out of bronze that could be easily distributed.

Écorché figures were commonly made out of many different materials: bronze, ivory, plaster, wax, or wood. By the late eighteenth and early nineteenth centuries, wax was the most popular use of material in creating écorché statues. The production of colored wax anatomies allowed for a variety of hues and tone that makes the models appear realistic.

=== 21st century ===
The écorché form of study still continues at traditional schools throughout the world including the New York Academy of Art, the Art Students League of New York, the Grand Central Academy of Art in New York City, the Pennsylvania Academy of the Fine Arts in Philadelphia, and the Academy of Art University in San Francisco.

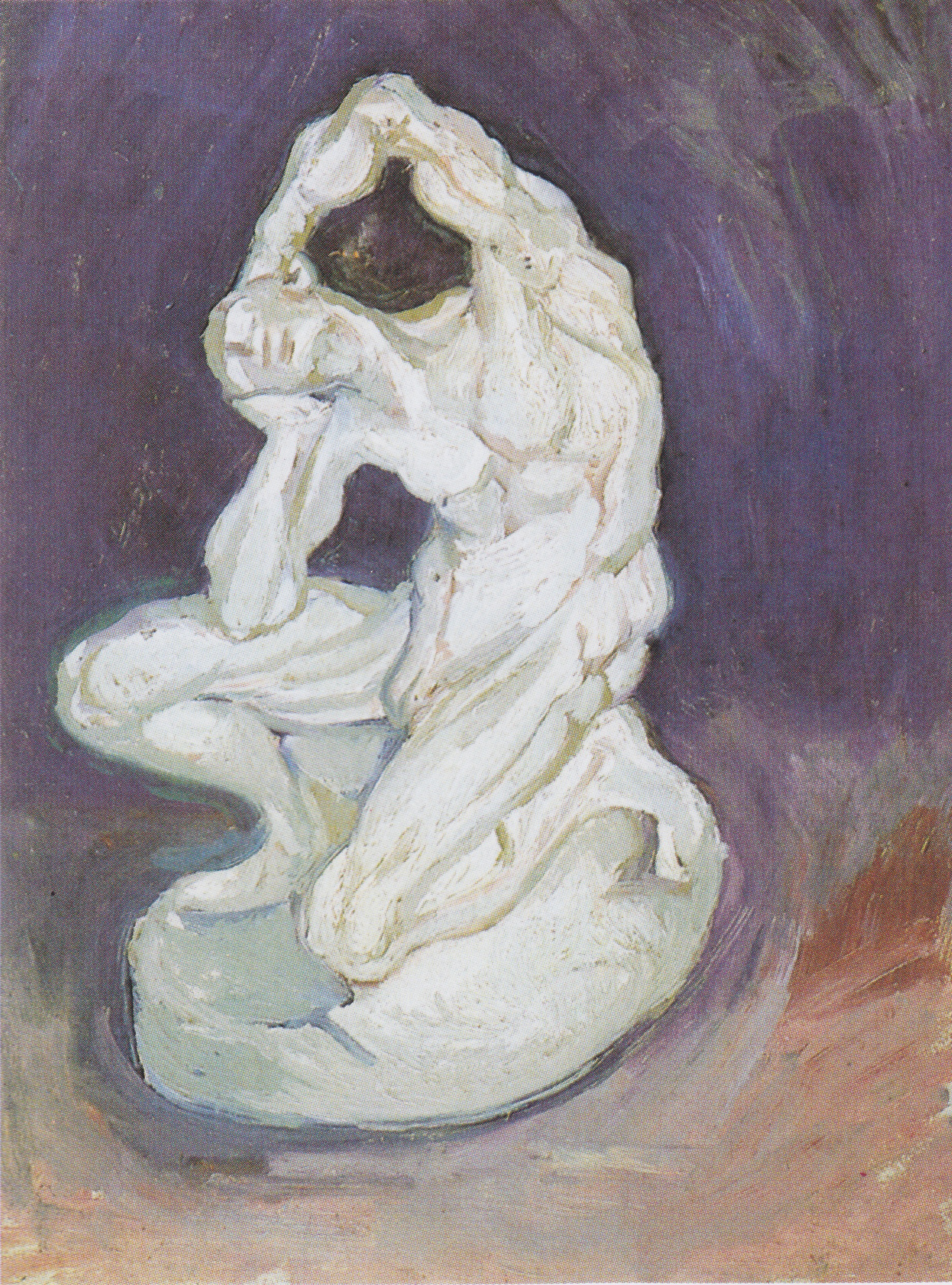
Van Gogh Écorché agenouillé

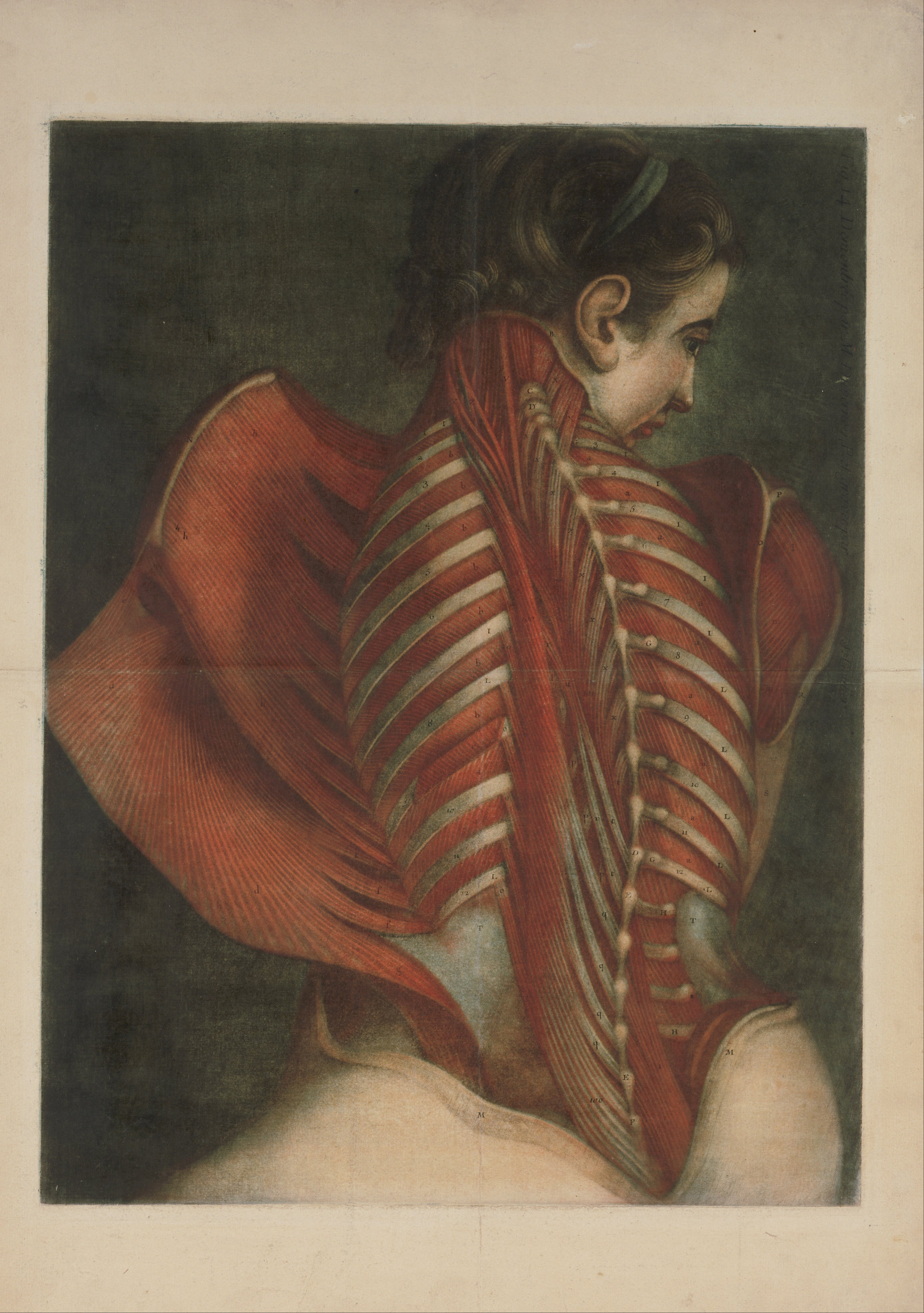
Jacques-Fabien Gautier-Dagoty

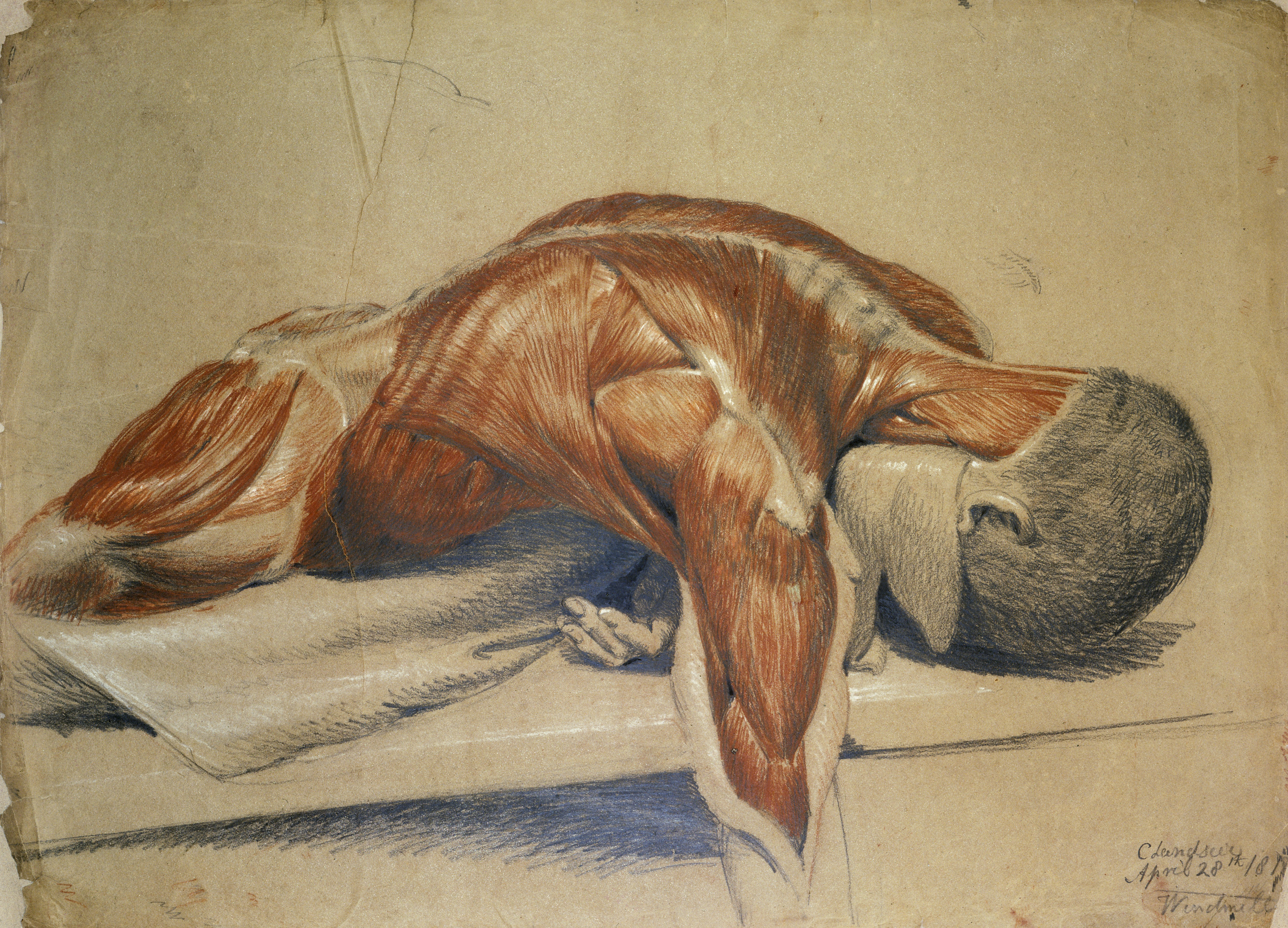
C. Landsee

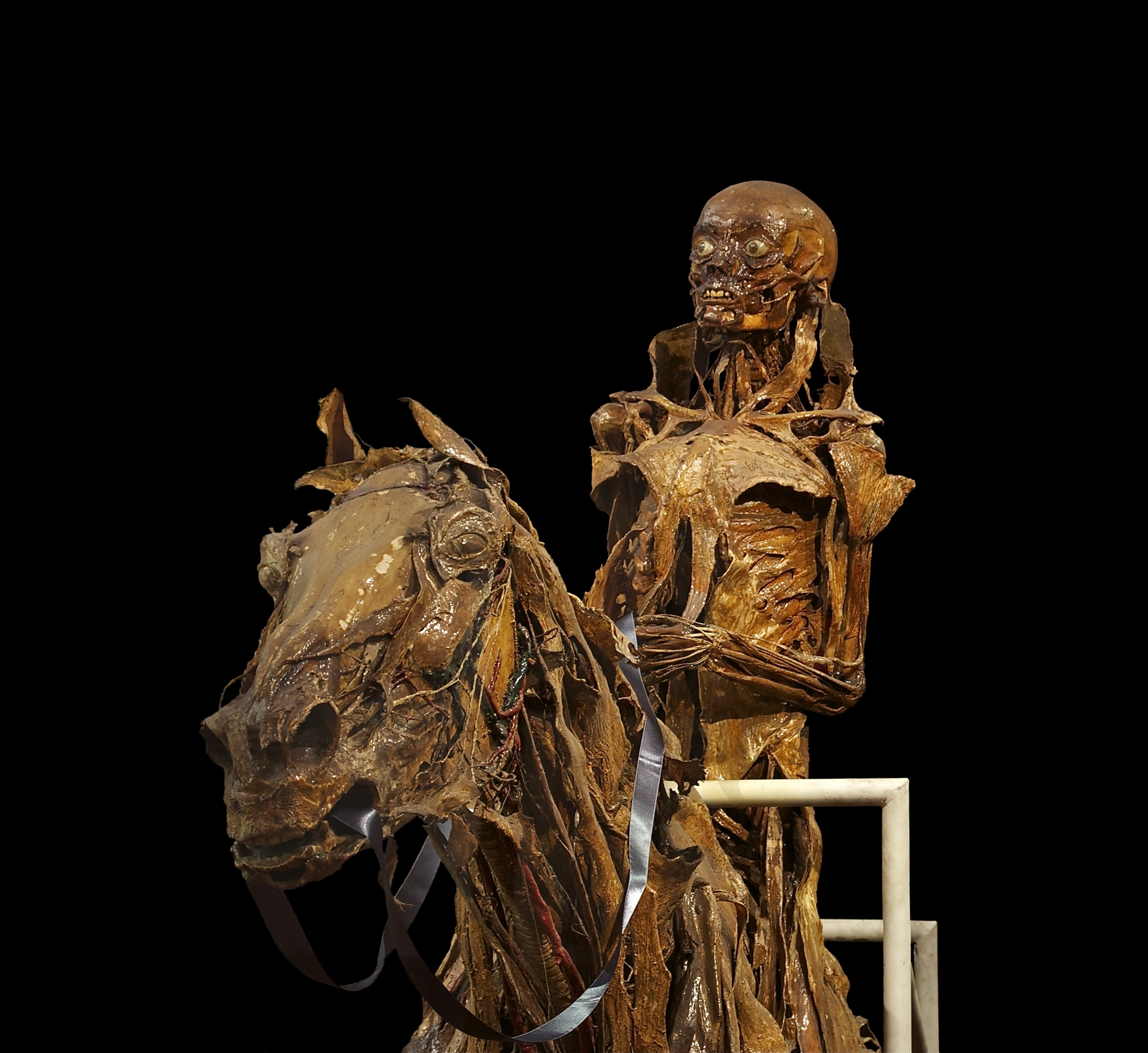
Écorché (with mummification) by Honoré Fragonard

== See also ==
- Bartholomew the Apostle
- Body Worlds
