= Pierre-Joseph Buc'hoz =

French physician, lawyer and naturalist (1731-1807)

- Born: 27 January 1731; Metz
- Died: 13 January 1807 (aged 75); Paris
- Citizenship: French
- Scientific career
- Fields: Botany, Law, Minerals, Publishing
- Author abbrev. (botany): Buc'hoz

Pierre-Joseph Buc'hoz (27 January 1731, in Metz – 13 January 1807, in Paris) was a French physician, lawyer, naturalist, mineralogist, and publisher.

Buc'hoz become a doctor of medicine in Nancy in 1763. He was devoted to botany, but was also interested in the treatment of melancholy and recommended music as therapy. He travelled throughout his native Lorraine and published a 13-volume Histoire naturelle of the province. Teaching botany as well, he was demonstrator at the Collège Royal des Médecins de Nancy. Author of many works of botany he also studied animals (in particular birds) and minerals.

== Partial list of publications ==
- Mémoire sur la manière de guérir la mélancolie par la musique.
- Medecine rurale et pratique, ou Pharmacopée végétale et indigene: ouvrage, egalement utile aux Seigneurs de Campagne, aux Curés, & aux Cultivateurs. Lacombe, Paris 1768 (Digital edition by the University and State Library Düsseldorf)
- Histoire naturelle des animaux domestiques, 1770.
- Histoire naturelle du règne végétal, 1774.
- Histoire générale et économique des trois ordres, 1775.
- Neueste Heilkunde oder Heilungsmittel, die entweder ganz neu erfunden, oder zur Cur macher höchst verzweifelter und fürchterlicher Krankheiten von neuem eingeführt worden sind . Felßeker, Nürnberg 1777 Digital edition by the University and State Library Düsseldorf
- Herbier ou collection des plantes médicinales de la Chine d'après un manuscrit peint et unique qui se trouve dans la Bibliothèque de l'Empereur de la Chine, Paris: chez l'auteur, 1781.
- Les dons merveilleux et diversement coloriés de la nature dans le règne animal, ou collection d’animaux précieusement coloriés, Paris: chez l'auteur, 1782.
- L'art alimentaire ou méthode pour préparer les aliments les plus sains pour l'homme, Paris: chez l'auteur, 1783.
- Dictionnaire minéralogique de la France, 1785.
- Dictionnaire des plantes, arbres et arbustes de la République.
