= Musée Fragonard d'Alfort =

Museum in Maisons-Alfort, France

Coordinates: 48°48′46″N 2°25′23″E

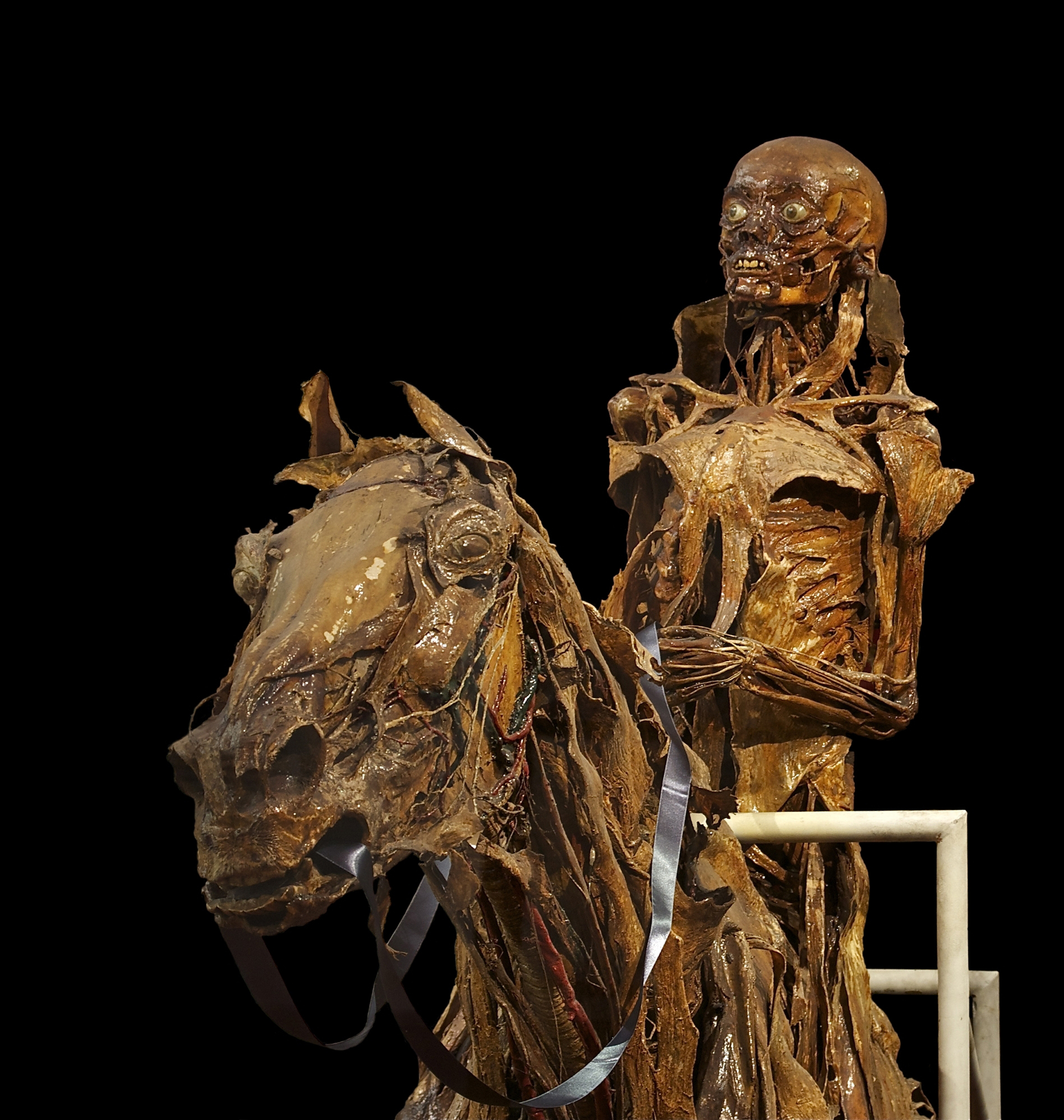
- Écorché of a horse and his rider by anatomist Honoré Fragonard, two of the cadavers on display at the museum
- Established: 1766 (opened to the public in 1991)
- Location: École Nationale Vétérinaire de Maisons-Alfort, Maisons-Alfort, Paris
- Type: science
- Collection size: ~4200 pieces
- Website: Le musée Fragonard

The Musée Fragonard d'Alfort, often simply the Musée Fragonard, is a museum of anatomical oddities located within the École Nationale Vétérinaire de Maisons-Alfort, 7 avenue du Général de Gaulle, in Maisons-Alfort, a suburb of Paris. It is open several days per week in the cooler months; an admission fee is charged.

== Collections ==
The École Nationale Vétérinaire de Maisons-Alfort is one of the world's oldest veterinary schools, and the museum, created in 1766 with the school, is among France's oldest. The museum attracted incredible international attention since the school's founding and was a critical component of the school's identity in the eighteenth century. It opened to the public in 1991, and today consists of three rooms containing a large collection of anatomical oddities and dissections, most of which date from the 19th and early 20th centuries. In addition to animal skeletons and dissections, such as a piglet displayed in cross-section, the museum contains a substantial collection of monstrosities (teratology) including Siamese twin lambs, a two-headed calf, a 10-legged sheep, and a colt with one huge eye.

The museum's most astonishing items are the famous "écorchés" (flayed figures) prepared by Honoré Fragonard, the school's first professor of anatomy, appointed in 1766 and in 1771 dismissed from the school as a madman. His speciality was the preparation and preservation of skinned cadavers, of which he prepared some 700 examples. Only 21 remain; all are on display in the museum's final room. These exhibits include:

- The Horseman of the Apocalypse - based on Albrecht Dürer's print, it consists of a man on a horse, both flayed, surrounded by a crowd of small human foetuses riding sheep and horse foetuses.
- Monkeys - A small monkey, clapping, accompanied by another monkey holding a nut in hand.
- The Man with a Mandible - inspired by Samson attacking the Philistines with an ass's jaw.
- Human foetuses dancing a jig - three human foetuses, arteries injected with wax.
- Goat chest - a goat's dissected trunk and head.
- Human head - blood vessels injected with coloured wax; blue for the veins, red for the arteries.
- Dissection of a human arm - a teaching exhibit, with muscles and nerves separated, and blood vessels injected with coloured wax (blue for the veins, red for the arteries).

The second director of the veterinary school, Philibert Chabert, was at first credited with, and later condemned for, having extended the collection substantially to include studies of foreign, aquatic, and avian specimens. Many of these specimens were extracted during the French Revolution and redistributed to National Museum of Natural History (France) and the École de Santé.

== See also ==
- List of museums in Paris
