= Charenton Metro-Viaduct =

Girder bridge in France

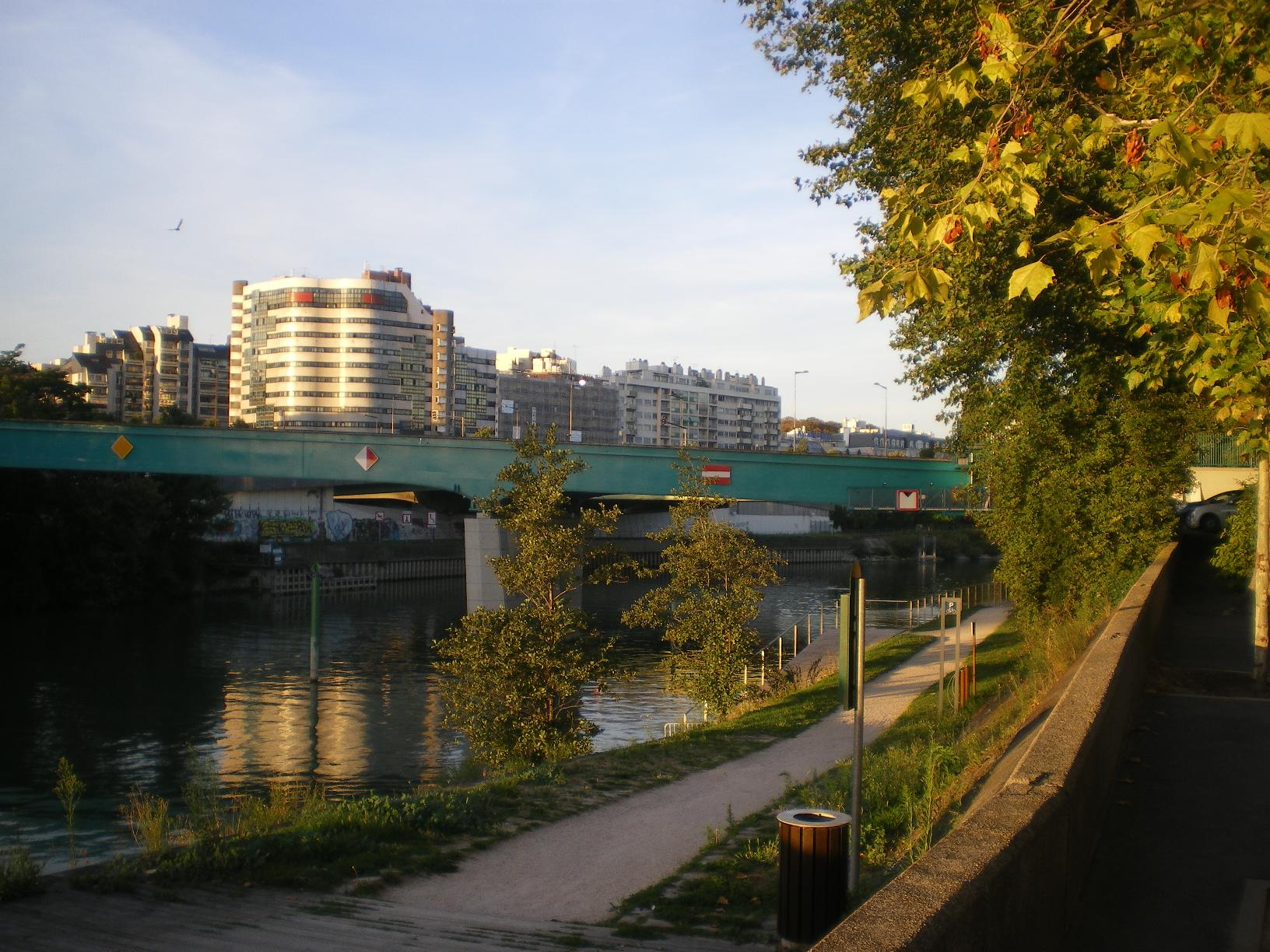
- The viaduct as seen from Maisons-Alfort in 2013, after its renovation.
- Coordinates: 48°49′00″N 02°25′07.27″E
- Crosses: Marne
- Locale: France, Île-de-France region, Val-de-Marne department, Charenton-le-Pont and Maisons-Alfort communes.
- Official name: Charenton Metro-Viaduct
- Owner: RATP Group

Characteristics
- Design: Girder bridge
- Material: Steel
- Total length: 199 m
- Longest span: 55.5 m

History
- Built: 1968–1969
- Opened: 19 September 1970

Statistics
- Daily traffic: Paris Metro Line 8

Location
- Interactive map of Charenton Metro-Viaduct

The Charenton Metro-Viaduct is a railroad girder bridge located in the French department of Val-de-Marne in the Île-de-France region. It links the communes of Charenton-le-Pont and Maisons-Alfort, crossing the Marne river, as well as the A4 autoroute and 103 departmental road. First put into operation in 1970, the viaduct is used by trains on Line 8 of the Paris Metro.

The total length of the viaduct is 199 m. Made up of steel beams resting on concrete piers, the viaduct has a continuous gradient, due to the difference in level between the two banks of the Marne. It was renovated for the first time in 2011.

== Location ==
The viaduct is located between the Charenton–Écoles and Maisons-Alfort–Stade stations. It crosses the 103 departmental road, the A4 autoroute and then the Marne. Since Charenton-le-Pont is located on a hillside overlooking the Marne, the viaduct is inclined to compensate for the difference in level between the two stations. The structure is flanked by two tramways, enabling Line 8 to return underground.

The surrounding bridges are the Charenton bridge, to the east, and the railway viaduct of the Paris–Marseille railway, to the west. The structure is only a few hundred meters away from the confluence of the Marne and Seine rivers.

== Technical specifications ==
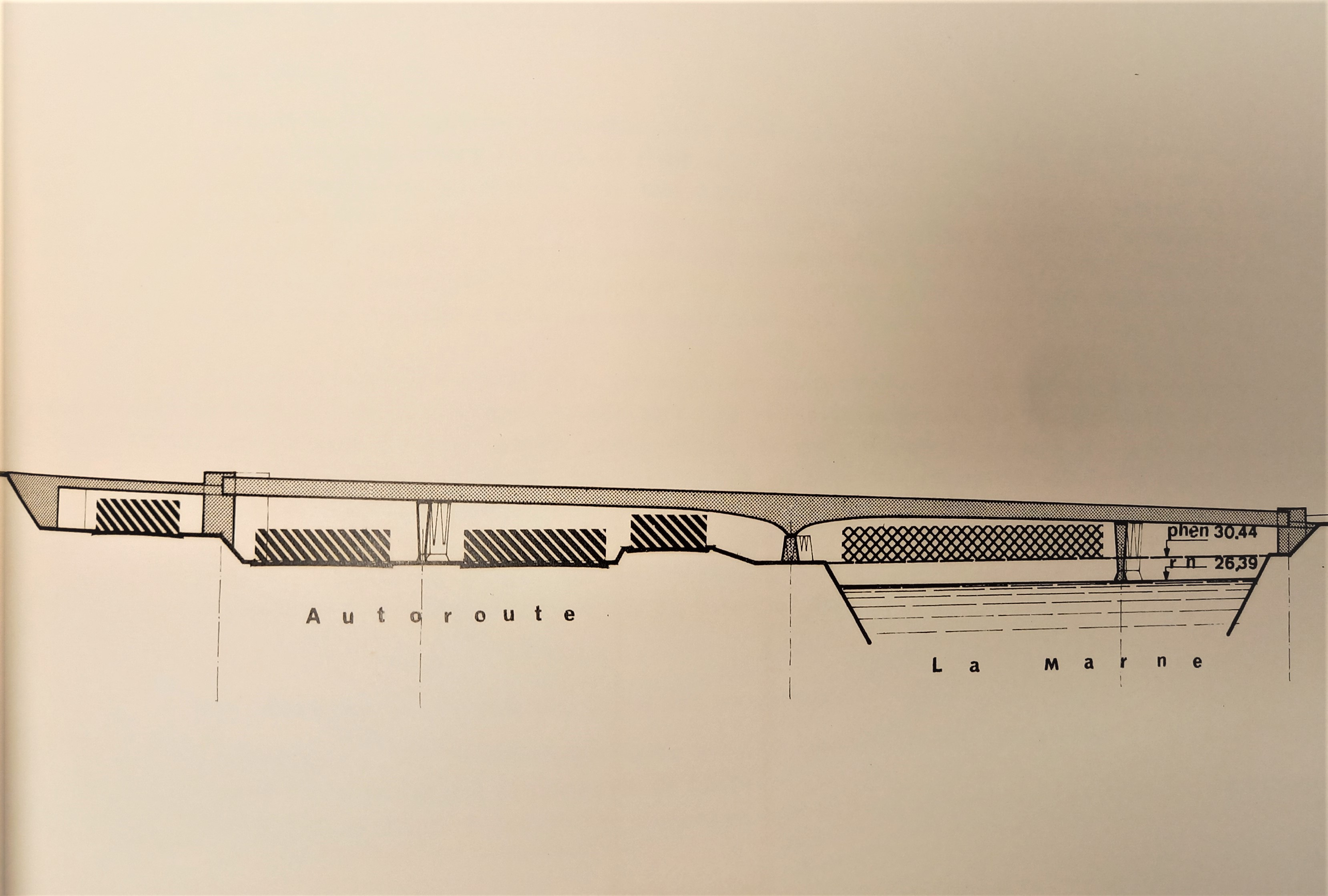
Longitudinal section of the structure.

The total length of the viaduct is 199 m, with an average height of 15.05 m between the rail and the water level. The structure has a continuous gradient of 41 mm/m towards Maisons-Alfort. It comprises two 55.5 m central sections and two 30 m lateral sections. The structure rests on six supports for three concrete piles, one of which is set in the riverbed.

The steel deck is designed to aesthetically blend into the landscape. It consists of a continuous beam supported by two vertical solid-core girders located between the two tracks. By enclosing the lower part of the trains, they minimize rolling noise. The track rests on ballast, which is laid on a concrete screed.

== History ==
With the Charenton bridge becoming too saturated, in 1965 it was decided to extend Line 8 from Charenton–Écoles to Maisons-Alfort and Créteil. To achieve this, the line had to cross the Marne, but the difference in level between the two banks was too great to allow the line to pass under the river, as Charenton was located on a highland plateau. Instead, an elevated viaduct crossing was chosen – a first for the Metro since 1909.

This extension, which had been planned as early as the 1930s, had been postponed due to World War II. In anticipation of the metro's construction, buildings in Charenton's Rue de Paris were expropriated in 1937, including the Hôtel du Plessis-Bellière. The upper part of Square Jules Noël and Place de Valois, as well as the buildings lining it, were built to replace the destroyed buildings.

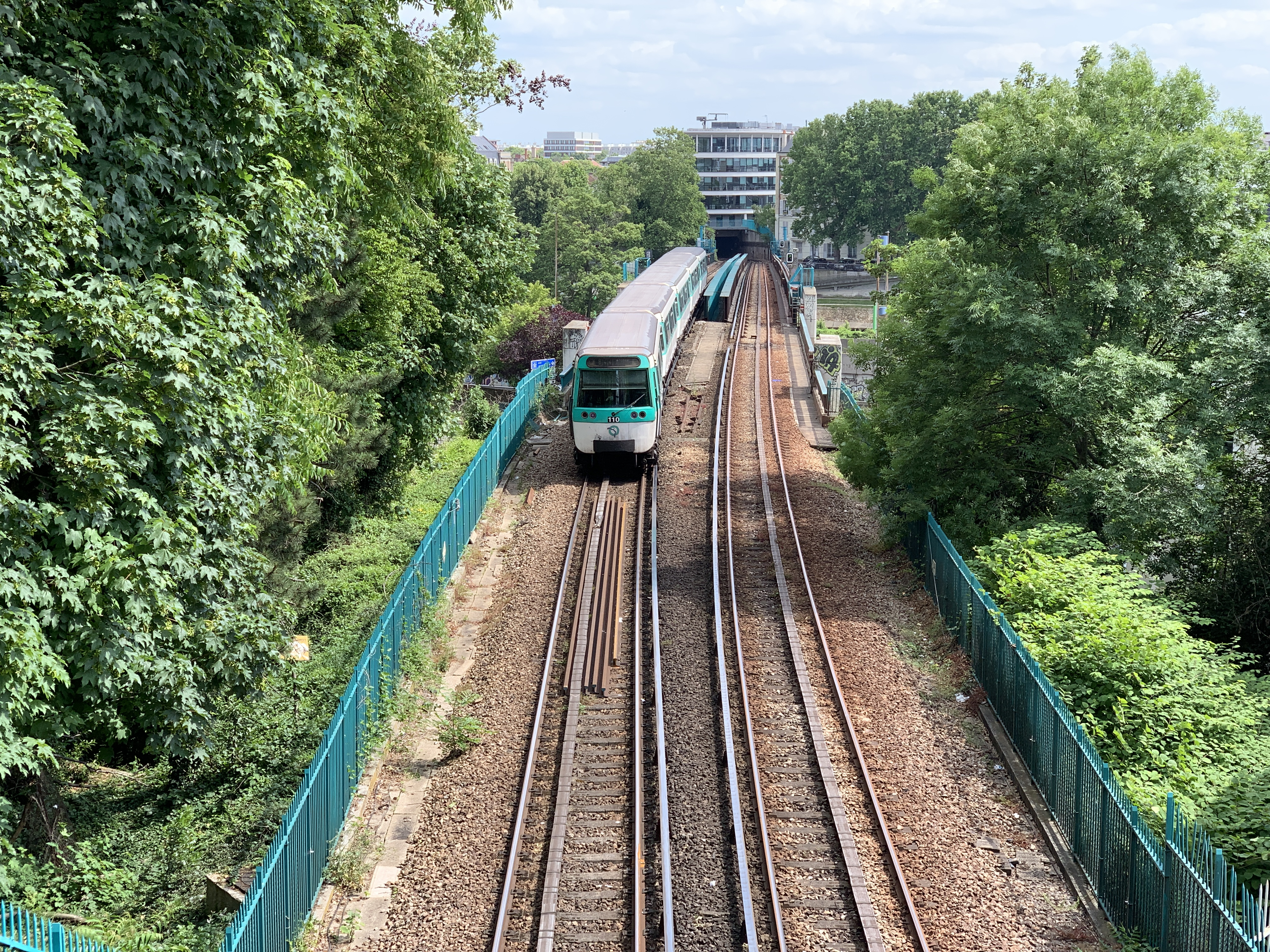
An MF 77 crosses the viaduct on its way to Paris.

Construction of the viaduct began in the spring of 1968, with the construction of the piers. The steel girders were installed in June 1969, and the viaduct was completed in November, enabling load tests to be carried out using five-motor Sprague-Thomson trains. The line was opened to traffic on 19 September 1970, with the extension of Line 8 from Charenton–Écoles to Maisons-Alfort–Stade.

In the context of the extension of Line 8 to Pointe du Lac, the viaduct was closed for renovations during the summers of 2010 and 2011, with a replacement shuttle service in place during this period. The aim of the renovation is to improve the soundproofing of the structure and adapt it to the increased traffic associated with the extension. After the removal of the tracks and ballast, the concrete slab was replaced and then covered with an anti-vibration rubber coating, reducing noise levels by 10 dB per train. At the same time, the viaduct was repainted in a blue-green color, replacing the original blue-gray. The total cost of the project was four million euros.

== See also ==
=== Bibliography ===
- Jean Robert, Notre Métro, Paris, éd. Jean Robert, 1983, 2^{e} éd., 511 p.
- Clive Lamming, La grande histoire du métro parisien de 1900 à nos jours, Atlas, October 2015, 336 p. ISBN 978-2-344-00403-6

=== Related articles ===
- Paris Metro Line 8
- Pont ferroviaire
- Crueize Viaduct
- Rue de Paris (Charenton-le-Pont)

=== External links ===
Architectural resource: Structurae
