= Rue de Paris (Charenton-le-Pont) =

Historic street in Charenton-le-Pont, France

- Route de Pais à Charenton; Route Nationale 5 from Paris to Geneva
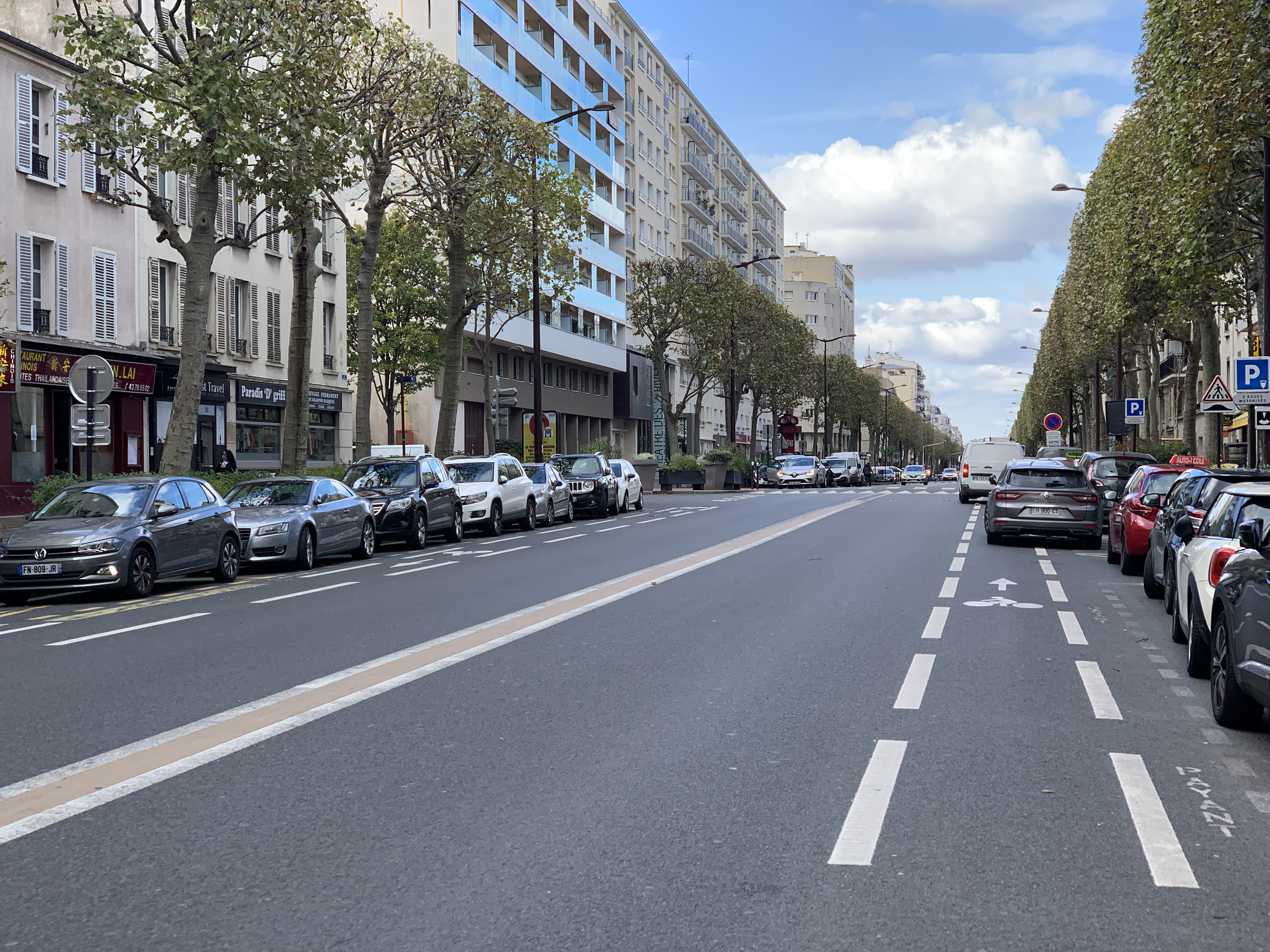
- Type: Street
- Location: Charenton-le-Pont
- Coordinates: 48°49′31″N 2°24′29″E

Construction
- Inauguration: 1690 (from Porte de Charenton to Place Aristide Briand)

The Rue de Paris is a street in Charenton-le-Pont, France.

== Location and access ==
It begins at the intersection of Avenue de la Porte-de-Charenton and Avenue de Gravelle in Charenton-le-Pont.

Crossing the city from northwest to southeast, it intersects several streets, including Rue de Valmy (formerly Rue du Parc-de-Bercy), Rue du Général-Chanzy, Avenue de la Liberté (formerly Avenue de Conflans), Rue des Bordeaux, and Rue Victor-Hugo. It then passes Avenue Anatole-France, the intersection of Rue de Conflans and Rue de la République, and Rue Arthur-Croquette, before ending near the Marne, at the border of Saint-Maur-des-Fossés, at the crossroads formed by Rue du Pont and Avenue du Maréchal-de-Lattre-de-Tassigny, formerly Rue de Saint-Mandé, continuing the route of Rue du Maréchal-Leclerc in Saint-Maurice.

The street is two-way from the Porte de Charenton to Place de l'Église, and one-way with restricted traffic beyond that towards Rue du Pont. The section between Place de Valois and Rue du Pont, which descends, is a narrow semi-pedestrianized shopping street lined with old houses.

It is accessible via the metro stations Porte de Charenton, Liberté, and Charenton – Écoles on Line 8.

== Origin of the name ==
The street is named for the fact that it leads to Paris.

== History ==
The street was successively Route Royale No. 6 during the Restoration, Route Impériale No. 5 under the Second Empire, National Route No. 5 from Paris to Geneva, National Route No. 6 in 1978, and currently D6.

Around 1970, through traffic was diverted beyond Place de l'Église onto the A4 autoroute, with connections leading to the east through Rue Arthur-Croquette, and west towards Paris along Rue Victor-Hugo. Since then, traffic has been very light from Place de l'Église to Rue du Pont.

=== Porte de Charenton ===
From 1860 to 1929, Avenue de la Porte-de-Charenton was part of Rue de Paris in Charenton, and before that, from 1790 to 1859, it was a section of the Paris-to-Charenton road within the commune of Bercy.

The Bois de Vincennes was once separated from Paris by the communes of Charenton-le-Pont and Saint-Mandé. To allow its annexation, on April 18, 1929, Paris created Avenue de la Porte-de-Charenton by annexing the former "non-building" area of the Thiers' fortifications between Bastions 3 and 4, adding the northwest end of Rue de Paris.

In 1971, a photograph was taken of the section of Rue de Paris at the boundary of Rue de la Porte-de-Charenton as part of the 6 Mètres avant Paris photographic series.

=== From Porte de Charenton to Place Aristide Briand ===
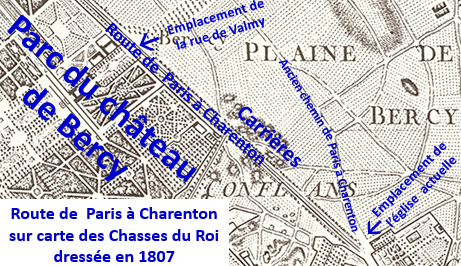
Route de Paris à Charenton, west of today's Place de l'Eglise, 1807, on the King's Hunting map.

The layout of the street from Porte de Charenton to the center of Charenton (Place Aristide-Briand) dates back to 1690 when Anne Louis de Malon, owner of the Château and park of Bercy, obtained permission from Louvois, the superintendent of buildings, arts, and manufactures of France, to move the Paris-to-Charenton road 30 toises (approximately 60 meters) north of the château and build a new road at his own expense. The original road was a straight line extending from the intersection of Rue Charenton in Paris and Rue Nicolaï, continuing to the junction of Rue Winston-Churchill and Avenue de la Liberté, following the current route of Rue de Conflans. The road crossed the large park of the château, designed south of Rue Charenton by Le Nôtre. The larger part of the park (to the west of Avenue de la Liberté) became part of the commune of Bercy in 1790. This area, part of the former commune dissolved in 1860, was divided between Charenton and Paris. Beyond the park, towards Place de l'Église, the road passed through the Bercy plain, which consisted of gardens, wastelands, quarries, and old quarries.

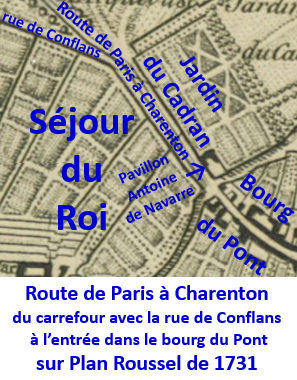
Rue de Paris between the junction with rue de Conflans and the "bourg du pont" on the Roussel plan of 1731.

The area north of the road (Rue de Paris) and the entire Bercy plain were acquired by the City of Paris in 1861 to develop the Bois de Vincennes, though this space remained part of Charenton until 1929. The area south of the road, up to the Quai de Bercy, was sold to a real estate company by the Count Gabriel de Nicolaï at the same time, who demolished the château and built wine warehouses along the Seine (currently between the périphérique, the railway line, and Rue du Port aux Lions). The land between the railway and Rue de Paris was subdivided for the western part after 1870 (now Valmy district), with construction on the eastern side of Rue de Valmy occurring later due to the presence of old quarries. The East Velodrome was built there, followed by the Nicolas company, which established its headquarters in 1920.

The land between Avenue de Gravelle and Rue de Paris, not developed as a public park, was transferred from the City of Paris to Charenton on March 28, 1888, and subdivided in the following years.

Thus, the urbanization of Rue de Paris from Porte de Charenton to Place Aristide-Briand took place in the last decades of the 19th century.

=== From Place Aristide-Briand to the Town Hall ===
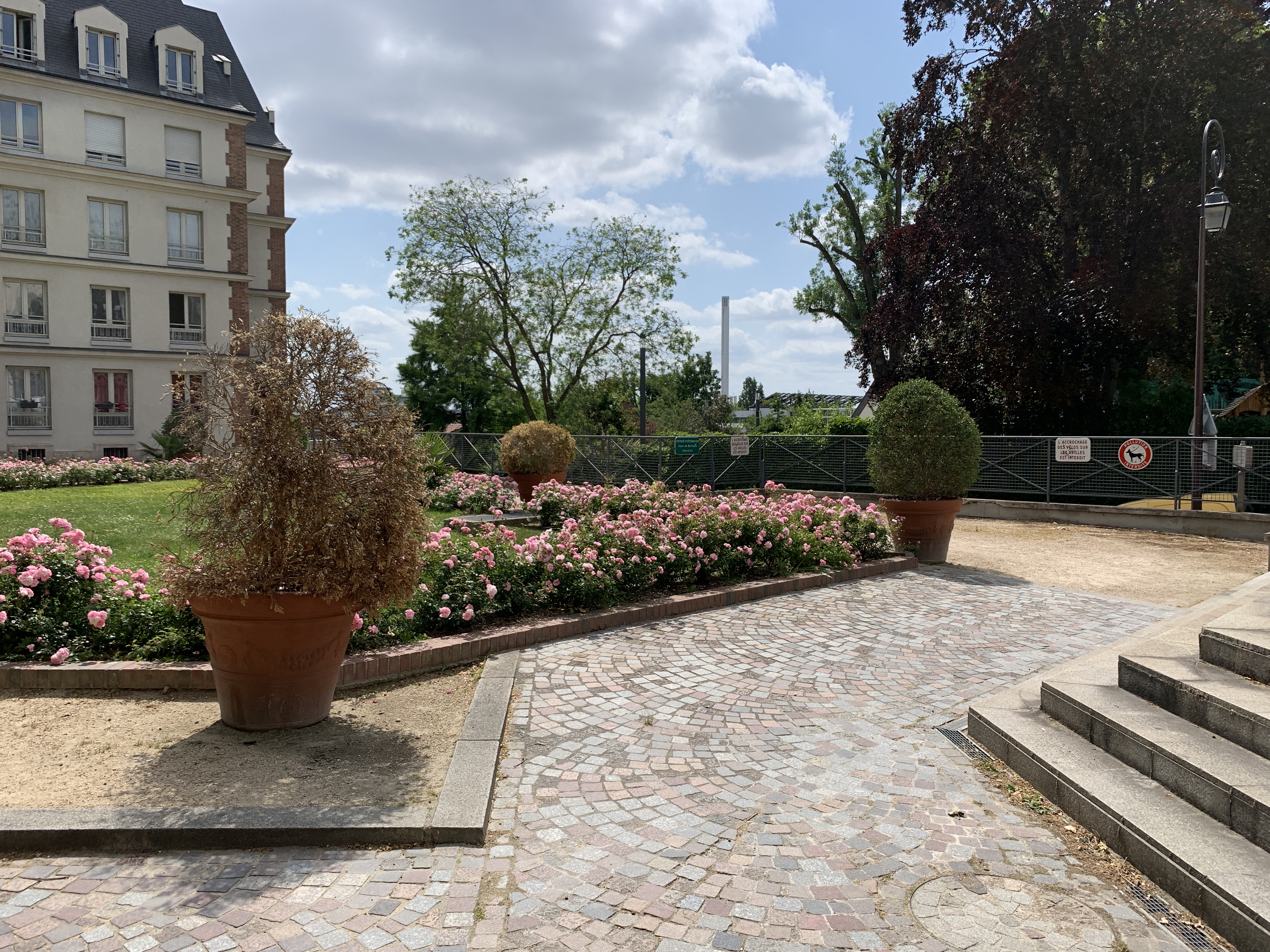
Place de Valois at the corner of rue de la Mairie on the site of houses demolished in 1937.

The location of Place Aristide-Briand is at the junction of Rue de Paris with Rue de Conflans, following the original route of Paris-to-Charenton before its deviation in 1690, and of the current Avenue Jean-Jaurès, which corresponds to a very old path, perhaps a Roman road, connecting Paris to Charenton, extending from Rue de Reuilly and Rue Claude-Decaen in Paris. This path disappeared within the Bois de Vincennes.

The section of the street between this junction and the Pavillon d'Antoine de Navarre (now the Town Hall) ran alongside the Séjour du Roi to the southwest and the Cadran garden to the northeast and was not bordered by buildings before the 1830s. The Cadran park, surrounding the Pavillon d'Antoine de Navarre, was subdivided between 1828 and 1832, with the opening of streets, including Rue Jean-Baptiste Marty and Rue Gabrielle, along which houses were built in the following period.

The Séjour du Roi land, sold after the death of its last owner in 1796, was subdivided, and construction on this side of the street began in the mid-19th century.

=== From the Town Hall to Rue du Pont ===
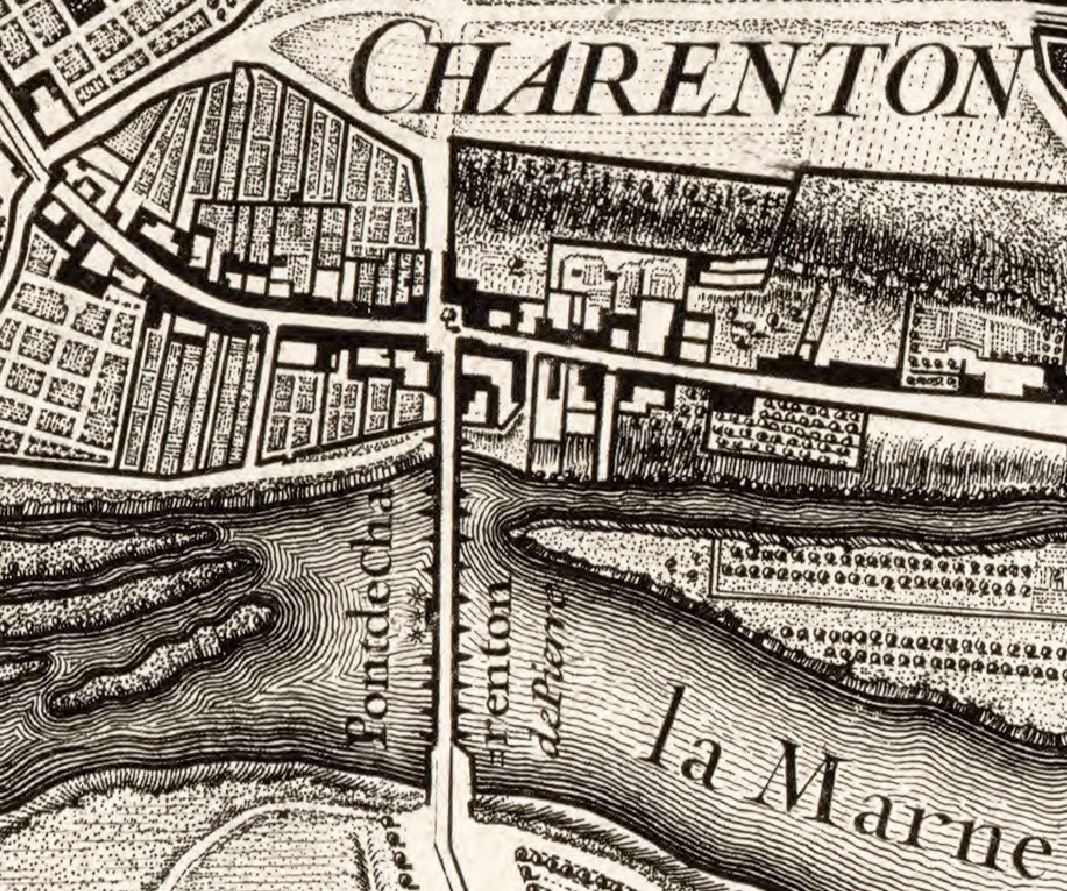
Rue de Paris arriving at rue du Pont, planned by Roussel, 1731.

This part of the street, which runs through the village of Pont, one of Charenton's three original urban centers in the Middle Ages, was known as rue du Pont or Grande rue before being renamed rue de Paris at the end of the 19th century.

You entered the Pont village, surrounded by a wall demolished in 1734, through a gate that was demolished in 1751, located at the corner of Rue des Quatre-Vents (now Rue Gabrielle-Péri).

This stretch, bordered by houses mostly from the 18th century, has retained its original narrowness.

Place de Valois and Square Jules-Noël were developed on the site of a mansion dating from 1640 and neighboring houses, demolished in 1937 for the extension of the metro line.

== Notable buildings ==
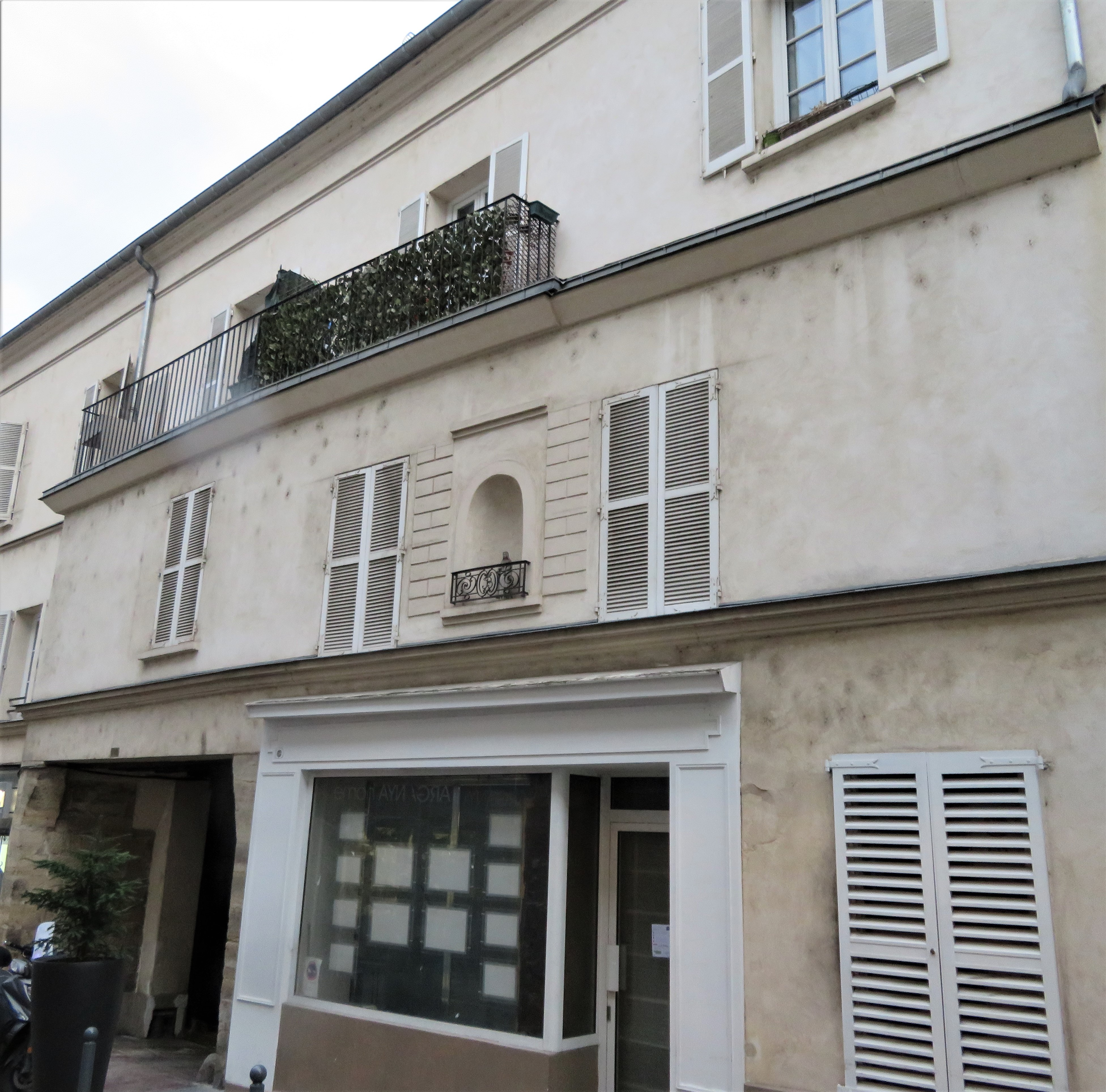
17–19 Rue de Paris.

- Valmy Cemetery, which borders Avenue de la Porte-de-Charenton in Paris, continues Rue de Paris.
- At Nos. 17 and 19, an old convent of the Sisters of Charity, closed during the Revolution, with its former use evoked by a statue of the Virgin in a niche on the facade.
- At No. 28, a building constructed around the end of the second quarter of the 19th century is listed in the general inventory of cultural heritage.
- At Nos. 37 and following, on the site of the current Place de Valois and the surrounding buildings, was the courtyard of the Hôtel du Plessis-Bellière, built in 1640 for the Marquis du Plessis-Bellière, replacing four inns that were demolished. The marquise du Plessis-Bellière sold the hôtel to Madame Jérôme Chamillard, and the hôtel was also known as Hôtel Chamillard. Its south facade opened onto a terrace overlooking the valley. The hôtel was expropriated in 1937, along with the neighboring houses, for the extension of the metro line, which was completed in 1972.
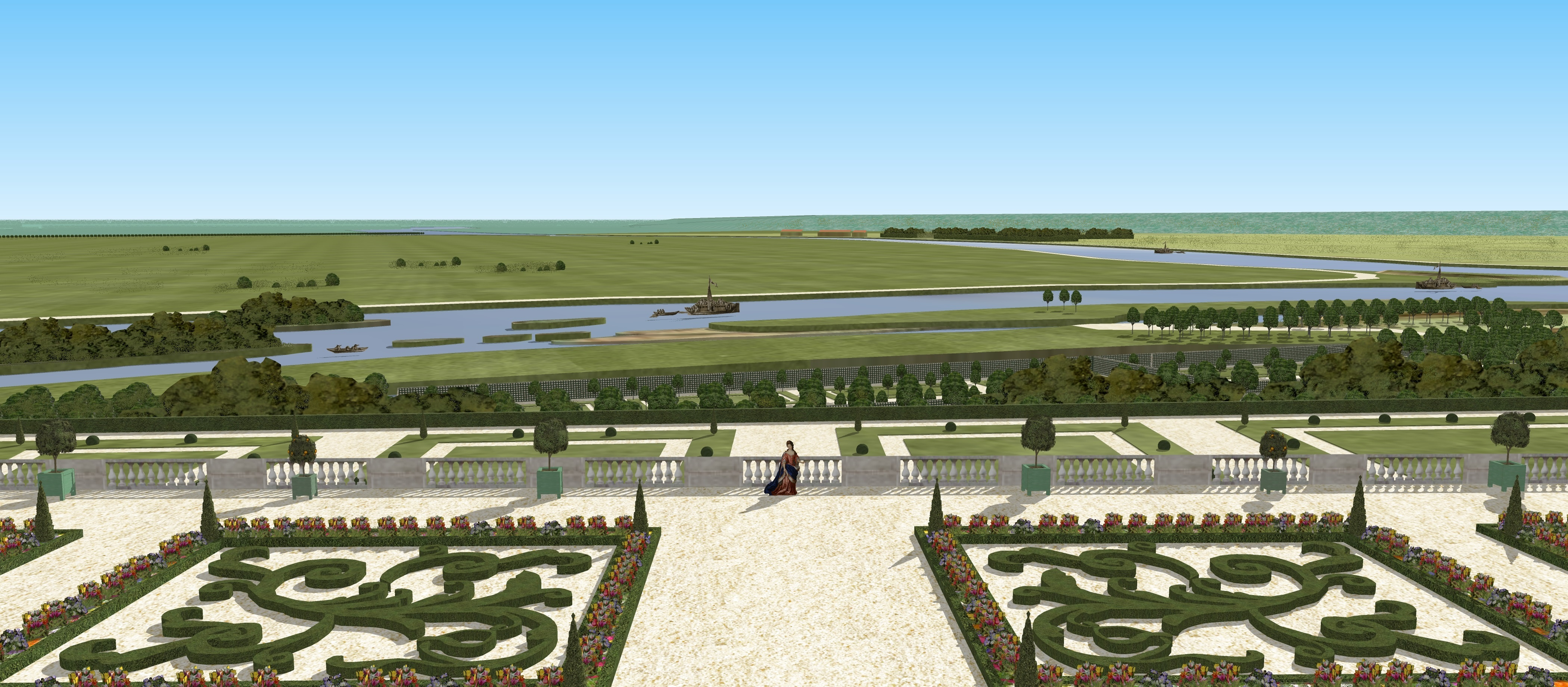
  View of the Marne from the terrace of the Hôtel du Plessis-Bellière.
- At No. 48, the Pavillon d'Antoine de Navarre, built around 1612, now houses the town hall of Charenton-le-Pont.
- At No. 91, the former Banque de France branch, built in 1925 over two levels, was raised in 1980 for a residential building.
- EssilorLuxottica company.
- Église Saint-Pierre in Charenton-le-Pont.
- Charenton-le-Pont District Court.
- Théâtre des 2 Rives.
- Toffoli Museum.
- Beth-Habad Synagogue.
