= Liberté station =

Metro station in Charenton-le-Pont, France

Liberté
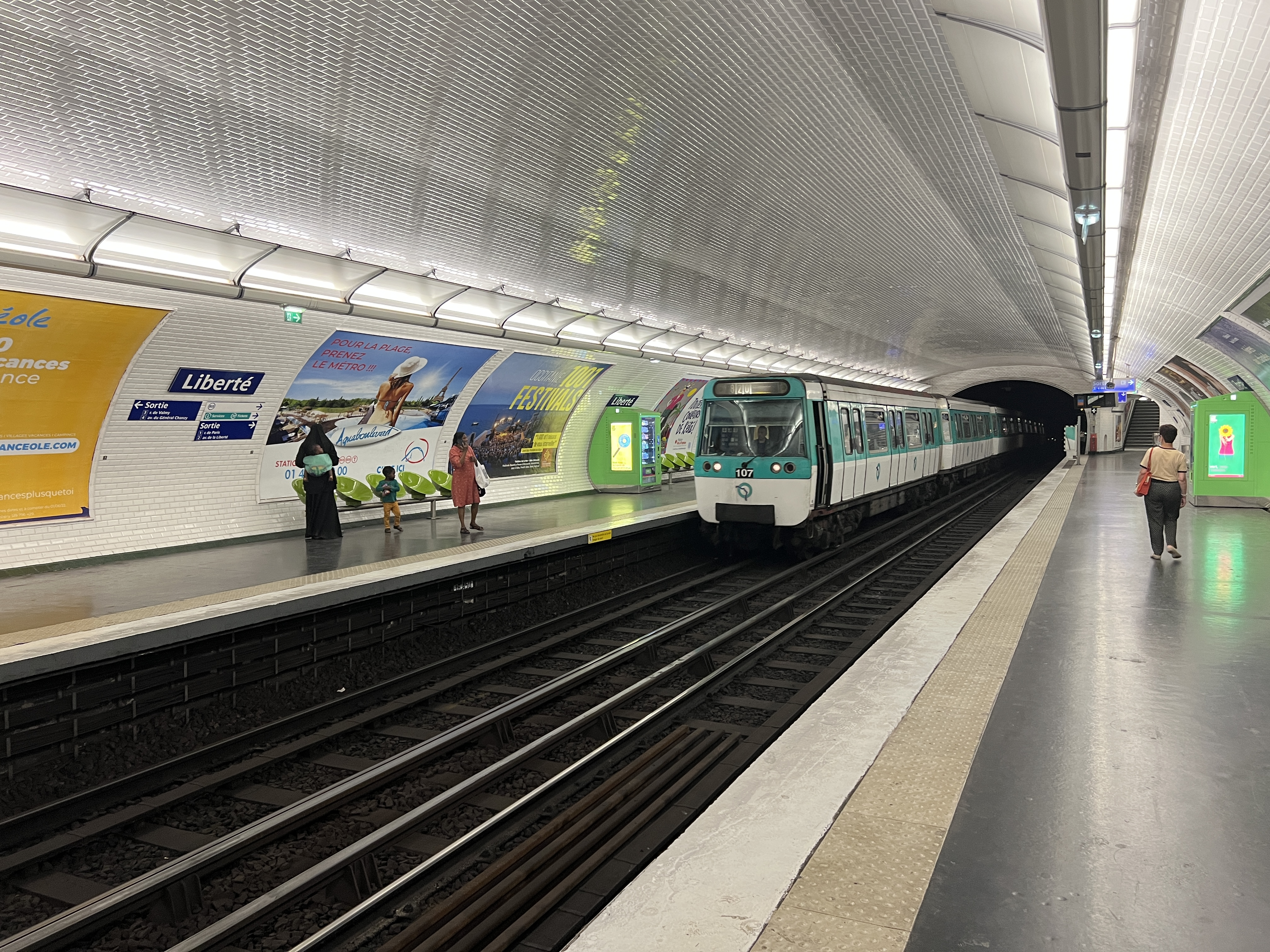
- MF 77 at Liberté

General information
- Location: Charenton-le-Pont; Île-de-France; France
- Coordinates: 48°49′33″N 2°24′25″E
- System: Paris Métro station
- Owner: RATP
- Operator: RATP
- Line: Paris Metro Paris Metro Line 8
- Platforms: 2 (side platforms)
- Tracks: 2

Construction
- Accessible: no

Other information
- Station code: 25-12
- Fare zone: 2

History
- Opened: 5 October 1942

Passengers
- 1,195,690 (2021)

Services
Preceding station	Paris Metro	Following station
Porte de Charenton towards Balard	Line 8	Charenton–Écoles towards Pointe du Lac
Location
- Location within Paris

Liberté (French pronunciation: [libɛʁte]) is a station on Line 8 of the Paris Métro in the suburban commune of Charenton-le-Pont. It is named after the Avenue de la Liberté which runs above the station; it refers to the motto of the French Republic: Liberté, égalité, fraternité.

== History ==
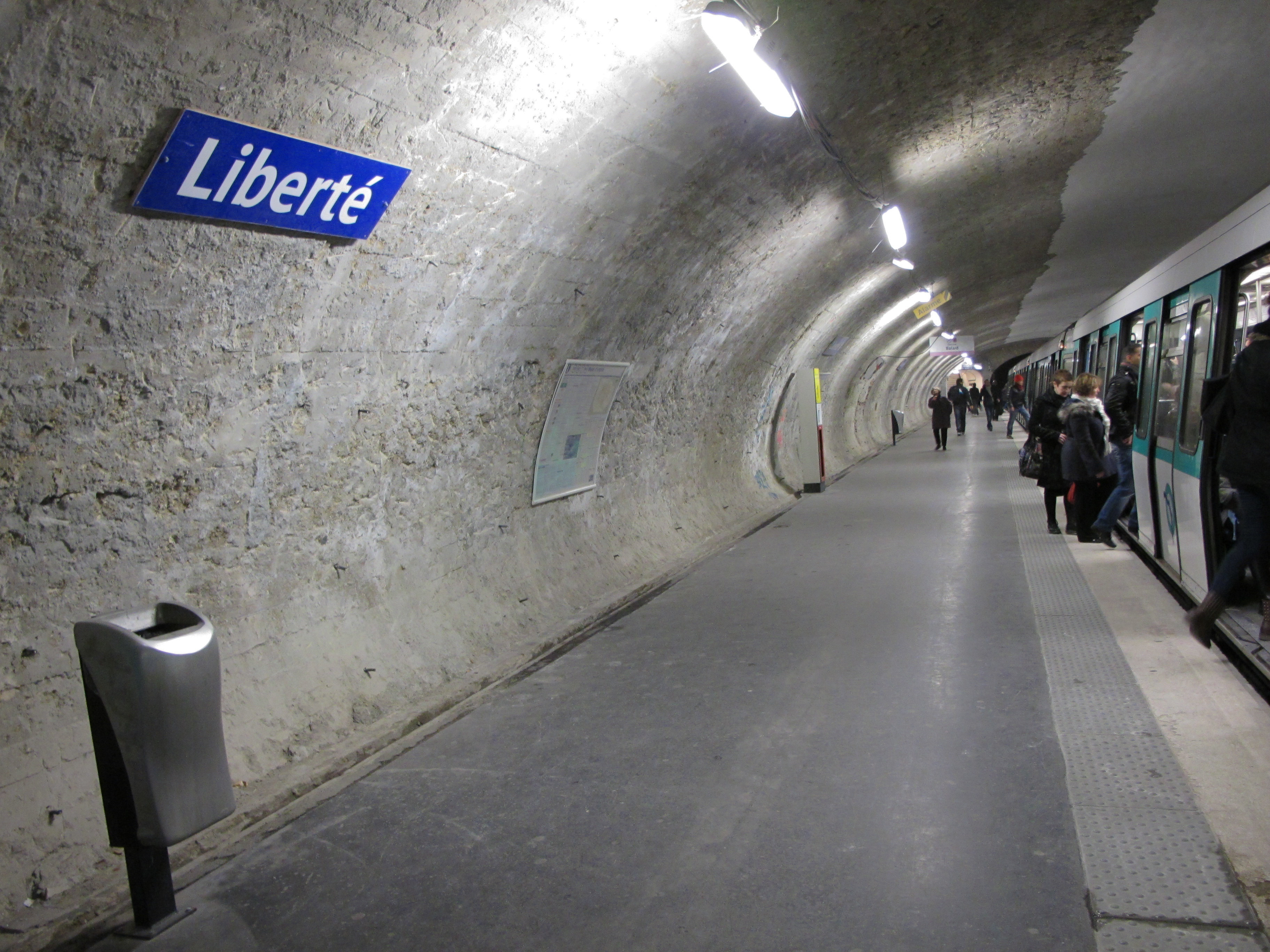
The station during its renovation in 2012

The station opened on 5 October 1942 as part of the extension of the line from Porte de Charenton to Charenton–Écoles. In 1969, the station was renovated in the Mouton-Duvernet style, characterised by its two-toned orange tiling, as opposed to the traditional white bevelled tiles found on the majority of the network's stations.

As part of the "Un métro + beau" programme by the RATP, the station was closed from 2 July to 29 August 2012 as part of its renovation and modernisation, including the replacement of the tiling, signage, and lighting, restoring the original look of the station.

In 2019, the station was used by 2,532,442 passengers, making it the 205th busiest of the Métro network out of 302 stations.

In 2020, the station was used by 1,195,690 passengers amidst the COVID-19 pandemic, making it the 219th busiest of the Métro network out of 304 stations.

In 2021, the station was used by 1,704,609 passengers, making it the 207th busiest of the Métro network out of 304 stations.

== Passenger services ==
=== Access ===
The station has four access points:

- Access 1: rue de Paris (an exit-only escalator from the eastbound platform)
- Access 2: avenue de la Liberté (on both sides of rue de Paris)
- Access 3: rue de Valmy
- Access 4: avenue du Général Chanzy

=== Station layout ===
Street Level
B1	Mezzanine
Platform level	Side platform, doors will open on the right
Platform level	Westbound	← toward Balard (Porte de Charenton)
Platform level	Eastbound	toward Pointe du Lac (Charenton–Écoles) →
Platform level	Side platform, doors will open on the right

=== Platforms ===
The station has a standard configuration with 2 tracks surrounded by 2 side platforms. The vault is elliptical. The decoration is of the style used for the majority of metro stations. The lighting canopies are white and rounded in the Gaudin style of the Renouveau du Métro des Années 2000 renewal, and the beveled white ceramic tiles cover the walls, the vault, the tunnel exits and the outlets of the corridors. The advertising frames are made of white ceramic and the name of the station is written in Parisine font on enameled plaques. The Akiko style seats are green in colour.

=== Other connections ===
The station is also served by lines 77, 109, 111, and 180 of the RATP bus network, and at night, by line N35 of the Noctilien bus network.

== Nearby ==
- Bois de Vincennes
- Cirque Phénix
- Foire du Trône
- Musée Toffoli, a museum dedicated to the French painter Louis Toffoli (1907-1999) who once resided in Charenton-le-Pont.
- Pelouse de Reuilly
- Vélodrome de Vincennes, the main stadium for the 1900 Olympics

== Gallery ==
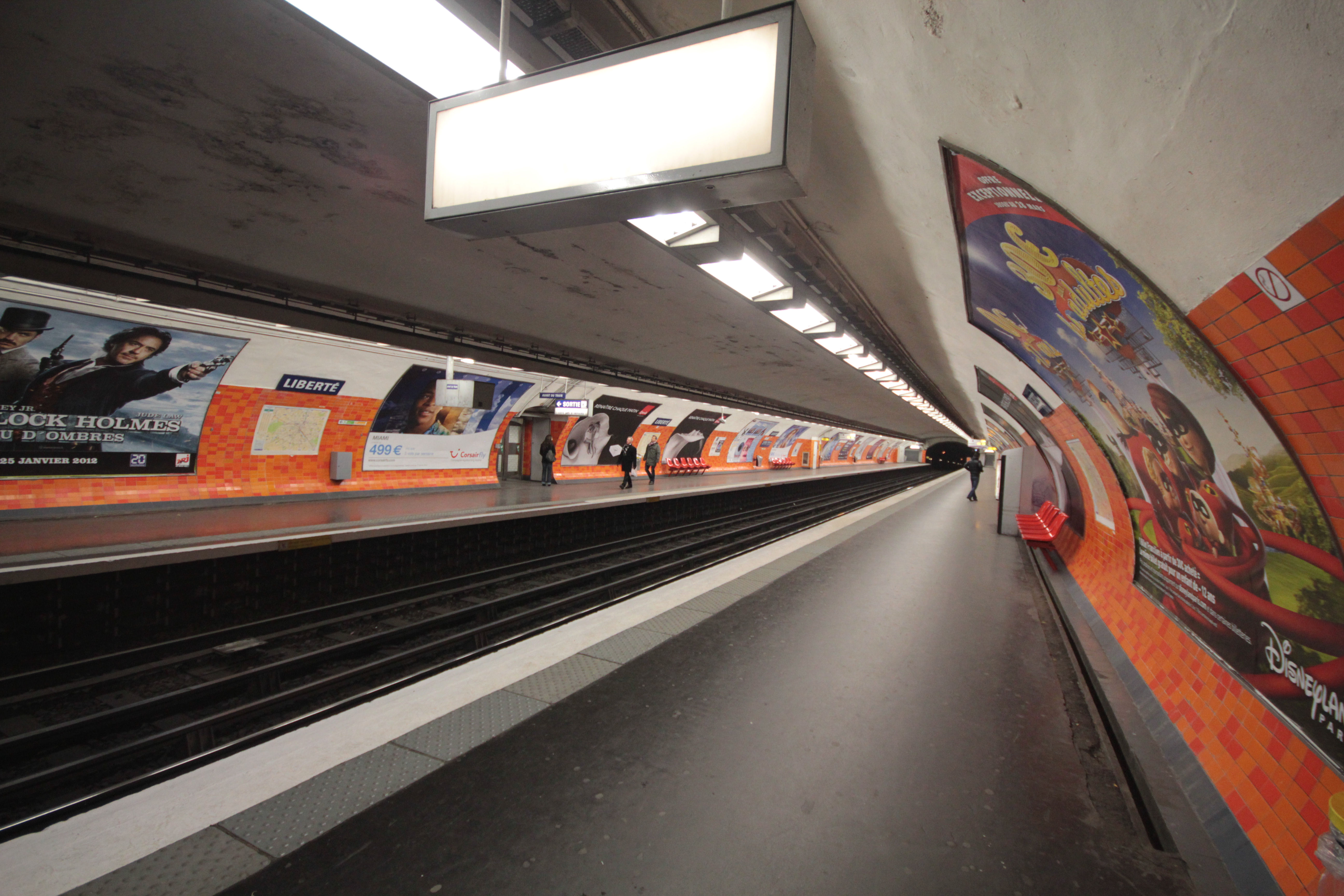
The station in the Mouton-Duvernet style prior to 2012

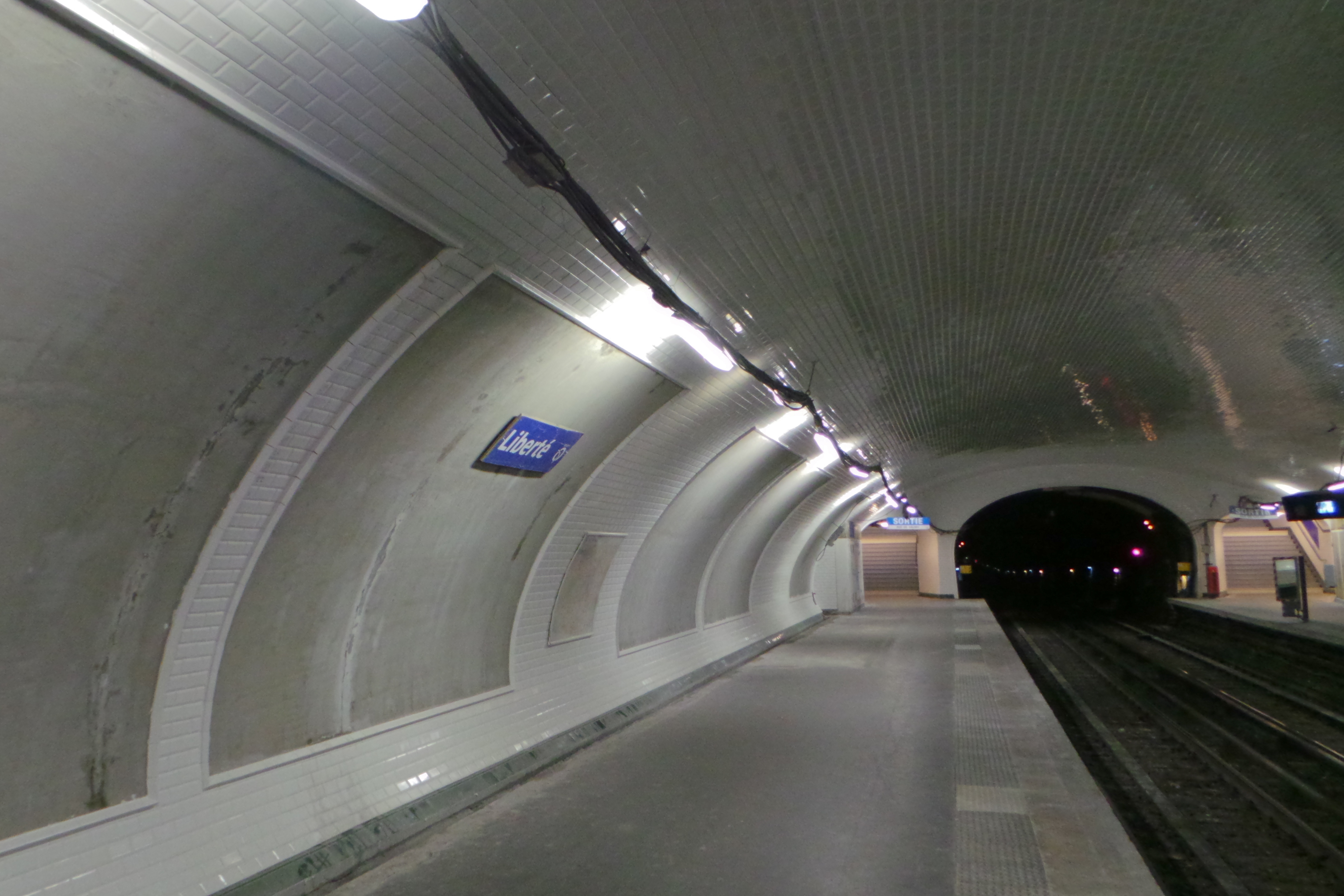
The station in 2013

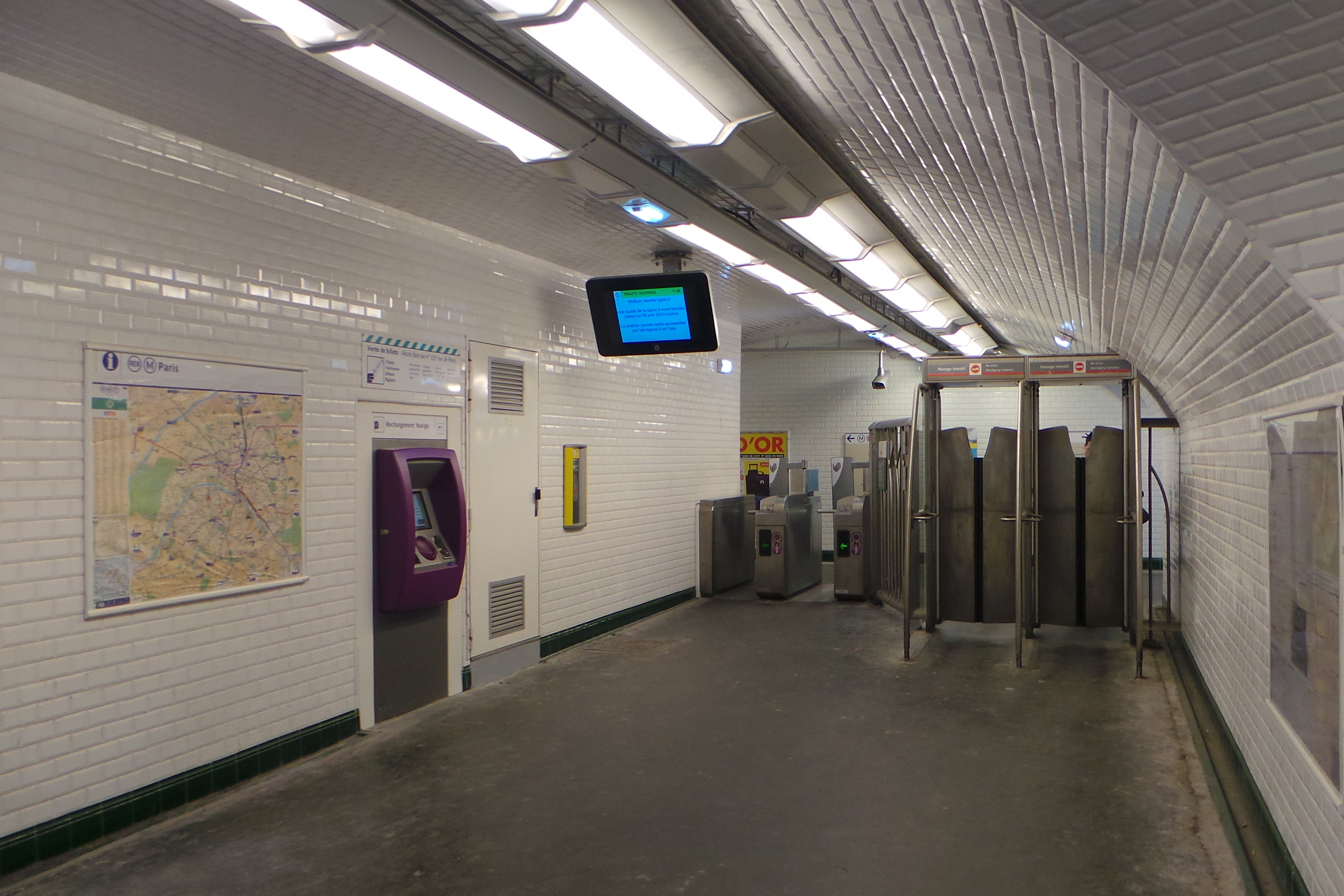
Ticket barriers at the mezzanine

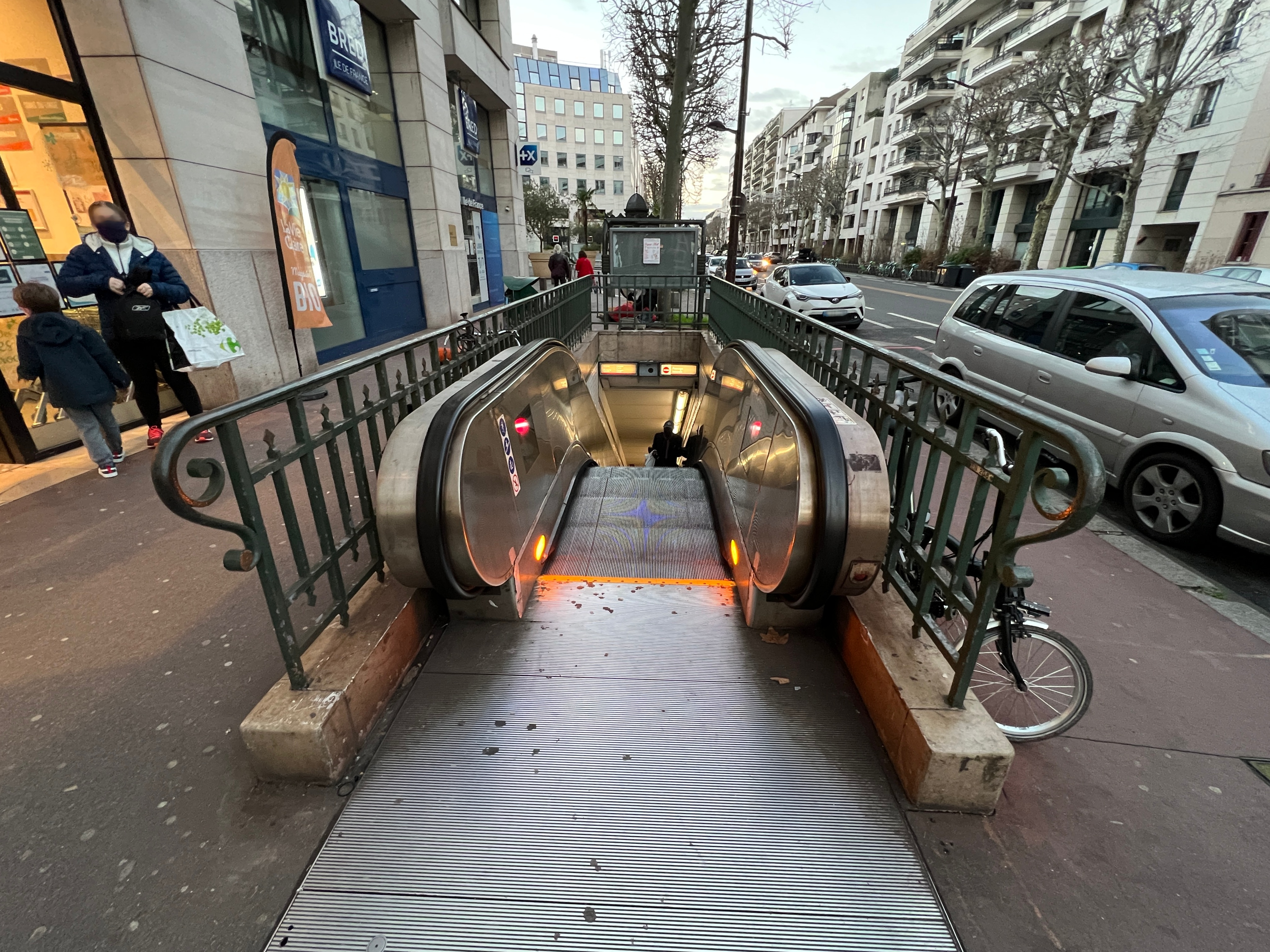
Access 1

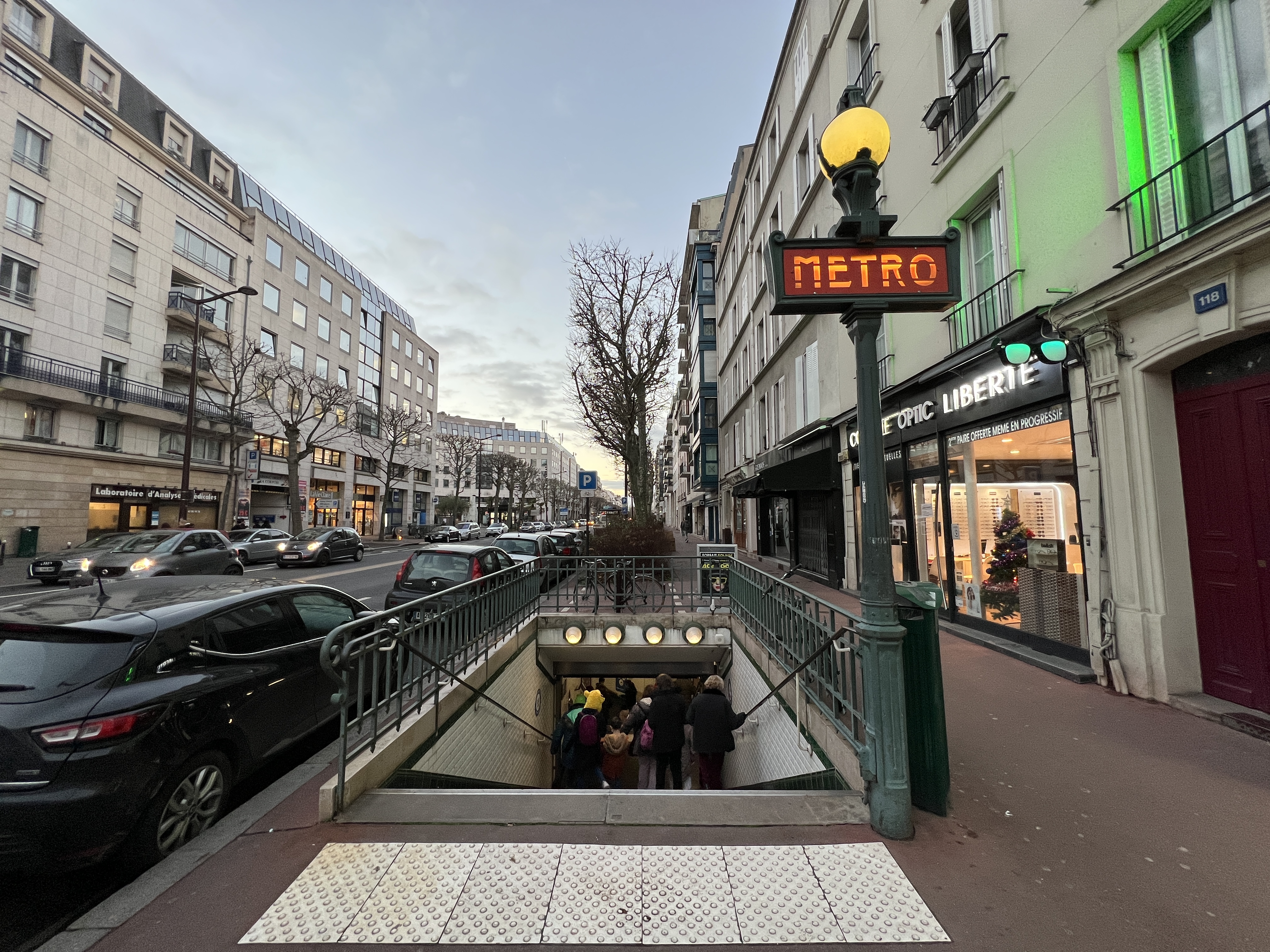
Access 2

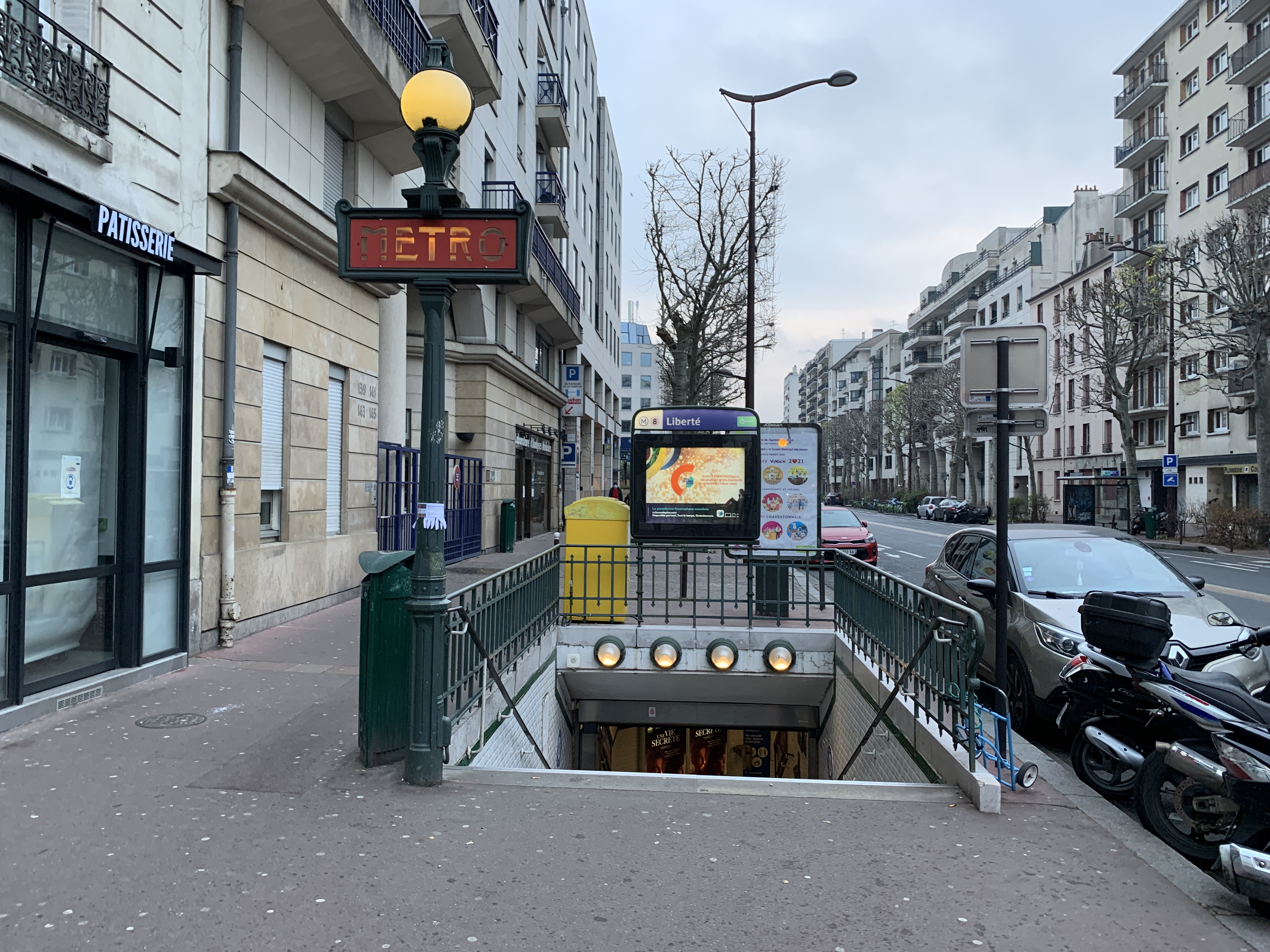
Access 2

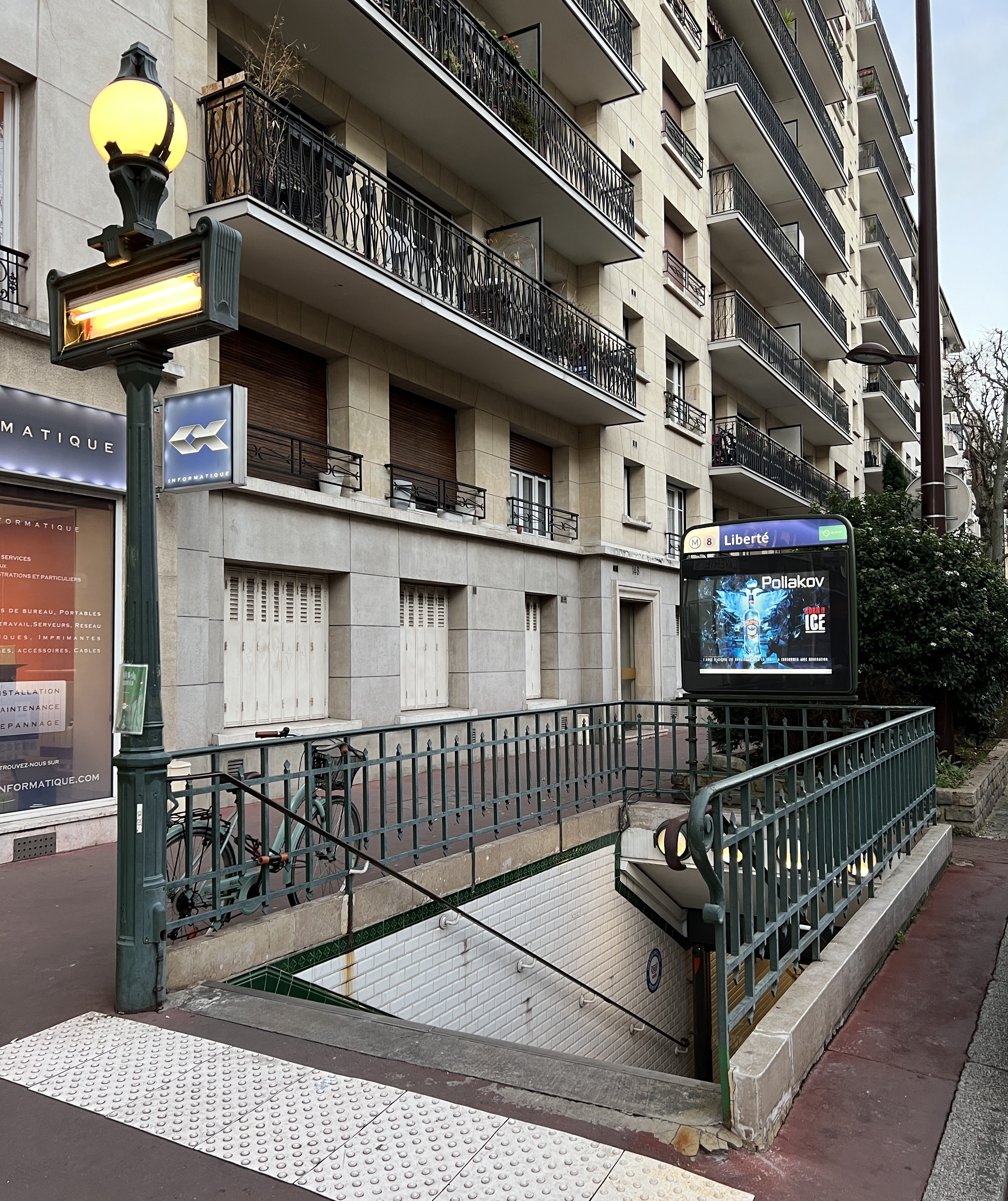
Access 3

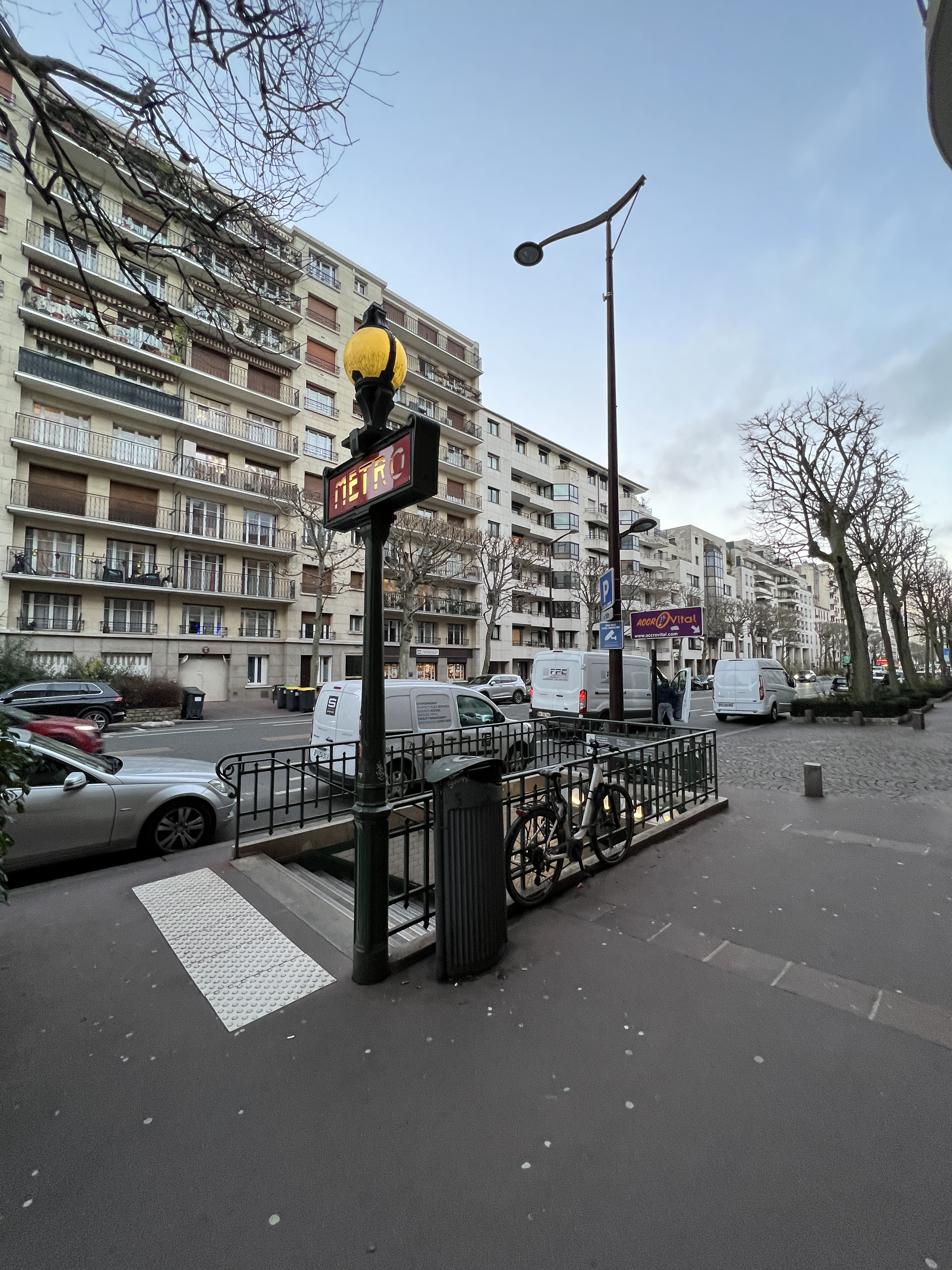
Access 4
