= Saint-Maurice, Val-de-Marne =

Saint-Maurice
- Commune
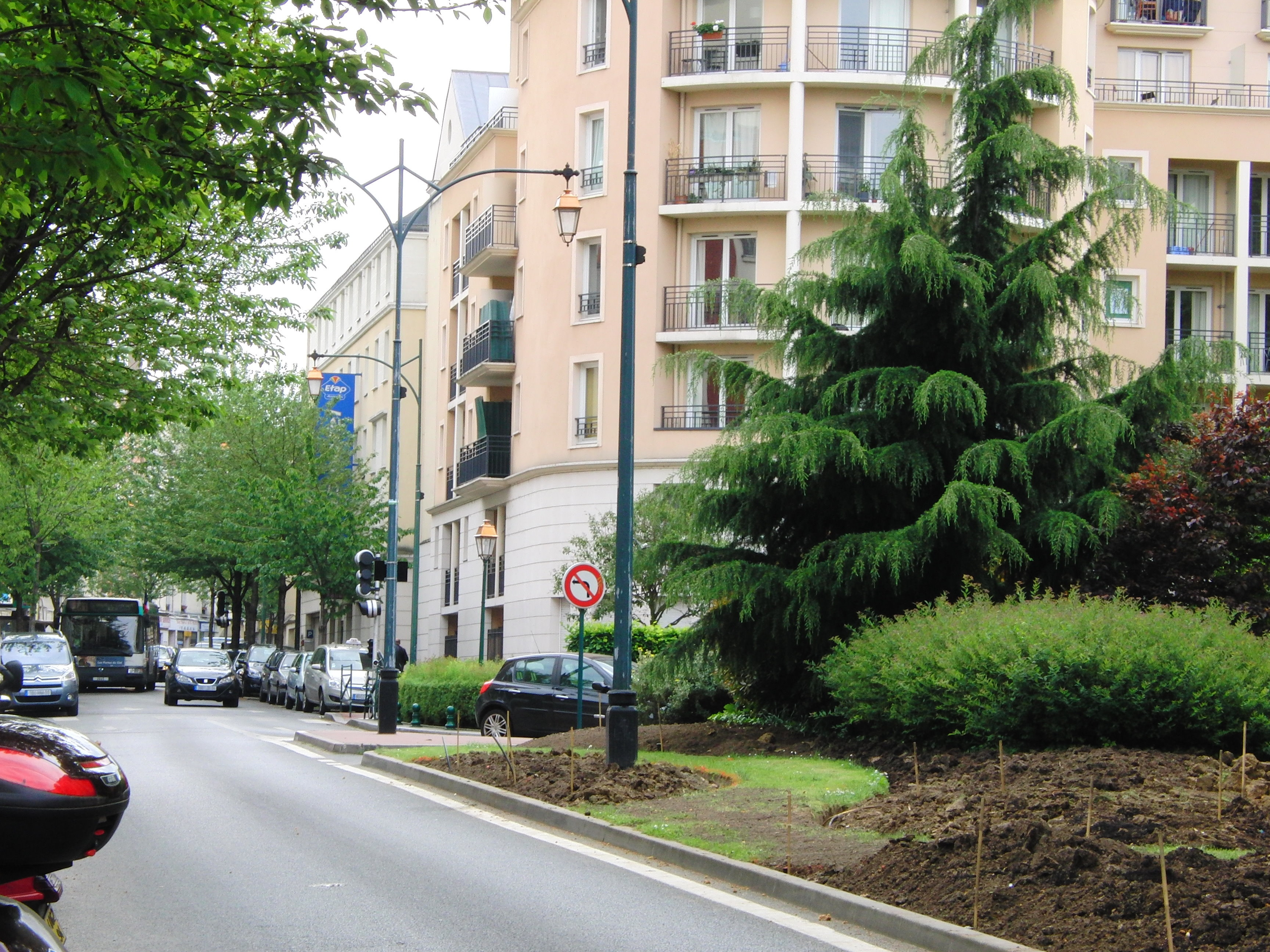
- Rue du Maréchal-Leclerc, in Saint-Maurice

- Coat of arms

- Location (in red) within Paris inner suburbs
- Location of Saint-Maurice
- Location within France Location within Île-de-France (region)
- Coordinates: 48°48′56″N 2°27′33″E
- Country: France
- Region: Île-de-France
- Department: Val-de-Marne
- Arrondissement: Créteil
- Canton: Charenton-le-Pont
- Intercommunality: Grand Paris
- Area^{1}: 1.43 km^{2} (0.55 sq mi)
- Population (2023): 14,506
  - Density: 10,100/km^{2} (26,300/sq mi)
- Time zone: UTC+01:00 (CET)
  - Summer (DST): UTC+02:00 (CEST)
- INSEE/Postal code: 94069 /
- ^{1} French Land Register data, which excludes lakes, ponds, glaciers > 1 km^{2} (0.386 sq mi or 247 acres) and river estuaries.

Saint-Maurice (French pronunciation: [sɛ̃ mɔʁis]) is a commune in the southeastern suburbs of Paris, France. It is located 6.8 km (4.2 mi) from the center of Paris. The lunatic asylum Charenton was located in Saint-Maurice; it is now a psychiatric hospital.

== History ==
Originally called Charenton-Saint-Maurice, the name of the commune was officially shortened to Saint-Maurice in 1842.

In 1929, the commune of Saint-Maurice lost half of its territory when the city of Paris annexed the Bois de Vincennes, a part of which belonged to Saint-Maurice.

== Geography ==
=== Climate ===
Saint-Maurice has an oceanic climate (Köppen climate classification Cfb). The average annual temperature in Saint-Maurice is 12.5 °C (54.5 °F). The average annual rainfall is 643.2 mm (25.32 in) with July as the wettest month. The temperatures are highest on average in July, at around 20.8 °C (69.4 °F), and lowest in January, at around 4.7 °C (40.5 °F). The highest temperature ever recorded in Saint-Maurice was 43.6 °C (110.5 °F) on 25 July 2019; the coldest temperature ever recorded was −25.6 °C (−14.1 °F) on 10 December 1879.

Climate data for Saint-Maurice (1981−2010 normals, extremes 1872−present)
Month	Jan	Feb	Mar	Apr	May	Jun	Jul	Aug	Sep	Oct	Nov	Dec	Year
Record high °C (°F)	16.9 (62.4)	21.7 (71.1)	27.0 (80.6)	31.3 (88.3)	34.5 (94.1)	38.2 (100.8)	43.6 (110.5)	42.2 (108.0)	35.9 (96.6)	30.0 (86.0)	21.9 (71.4)	18.0 (64.4)	43.6 (110.5)
Mean daily maximum °C (°F)	7.4 (45.3)	8.9 (48.0)	13.1 (55.6)	16.8 (62.2)	20.7 (69.3)	23.8 (74.8)	26.5 (79.7)	26.3 (79.3)	22.3 (72.1)	17.1 (62.8)	11.2 (52.2)	7.6 (45.7)	16.8 (62.2)
Daily mean °C (°F)	4.7 (40.5)	5.5 (41.9)	8.8 (47.8)	11.6 (52.9)	15.4 (59.7)	18.5 (65.3)	20.8 (69.4)	20.5 (68.9)	17.1 (62.8)	12.9 (55.2)	8.1 (46.6)	5.2 (41.4)	12.5 (54.5)
Mean daily minimum °C (°F)	2.1 (35.8)	2.1 (35.8)	4.5 (40.1)	6.4 (43.5)	10.1 (50.2)	13.1 (55.6)	15.1 (59.2)	14.8 (58.6)	11.8 (53.2)	8.8 (47.8)	5.0 (41.0)	2.7 (36.9)	8.1 (46.6)
Record low °C (°F)	−17.0 (1.4)	−15.4 (4.3)	−11.0 (12.2)	−3.6 (25.5)	−1.4 (29.5)	2.1 (35.8)	5.6 (42.1)	5.3 (41.5)	0.6 (33.1)	−4.8 (23.4)	−15.0 (5.0)	−25.6 (−14.1)	−25.6 (−14.1)
Average precipitation mm (inches)	52.2 (2.06)	43.2 (1.70)	46.6 (1.83)	49.6 (1.95)	60.8 (2.39)	53.3 (2.10)	61.0 (2.40)	52.7 (2.07)	50.1 (1.97)	60.7 (2.39)	52.7 (2.07)	60.3 (2.37)	643.2 (25.32)
Average precipitation days (≥ 1.0 mm)	10.6	9.5	10.5	9.4	10.3	8.4	7.8	7.8	8.3	9.9	10.3	11.3	114.1
Source: Météo-France

== Population ==
Historical population
Year	Pop.	±% p.a.
1968	10,477	—
1975	9,221	−1.81%
1982	9,420	+0.31%
1990	11,157	+2.14%
1999	12,748	+1.49%
2007	14,596	+1.71%
2012	14,870	+0.37%
2017	14,056	−1.12%
2023	14,506	+0.53%
Source: INSEE

== Transport ==
Saint-Maurice is served by no station of the Paris Métro, RER, or suburban rail network. The closest station to Saint-Maurice is Charenton – Écoles station on Paris Métro Line 8. This station is located in the neighboring commune of Charenton-le-Pont, 0.6 km (0.37 mi) from the town center of Saint-Maurice.

== Education ==
Schools in the commune include four preschools (écoles maternelles): Ecole du Centre, Ecole Delacroix, Ecole de Gravelle, Ecole du Plateau, three elementary schools: Ecole du Centre, Ecole de Gravelle, and Annexe Roger Revet, and one junior high school, Collège Edmond Nocard.

Area senior high schools include Lycée Polyvalent Robert Schuman in Charenton-Le-Pont, Lycée Intercommunal Eugène Delacroix in Maisons-Alfort, and Lycée Marcelin Berthelot in Saint-Maur-des-Fossés.

== Personalities ==
- Éric Assadourian, football player
- Eugène Delacroix, romantic painter
- Evan Fournier, basketball player
- Félix Lefebvre, actor
- Yves Niare, athlete
- Adrien Rabiot, football player
- Louis Rousset, racing driver
- Marquis de Sade, writer
- Hassan Yebda, football player
- Leny Yoro, football player

== See also ==
- Communes of the Val-de-Marne department
- Französischer Dom
