= Porte de Charenton station =

Metro station in Paris, France

Porte de Charenton
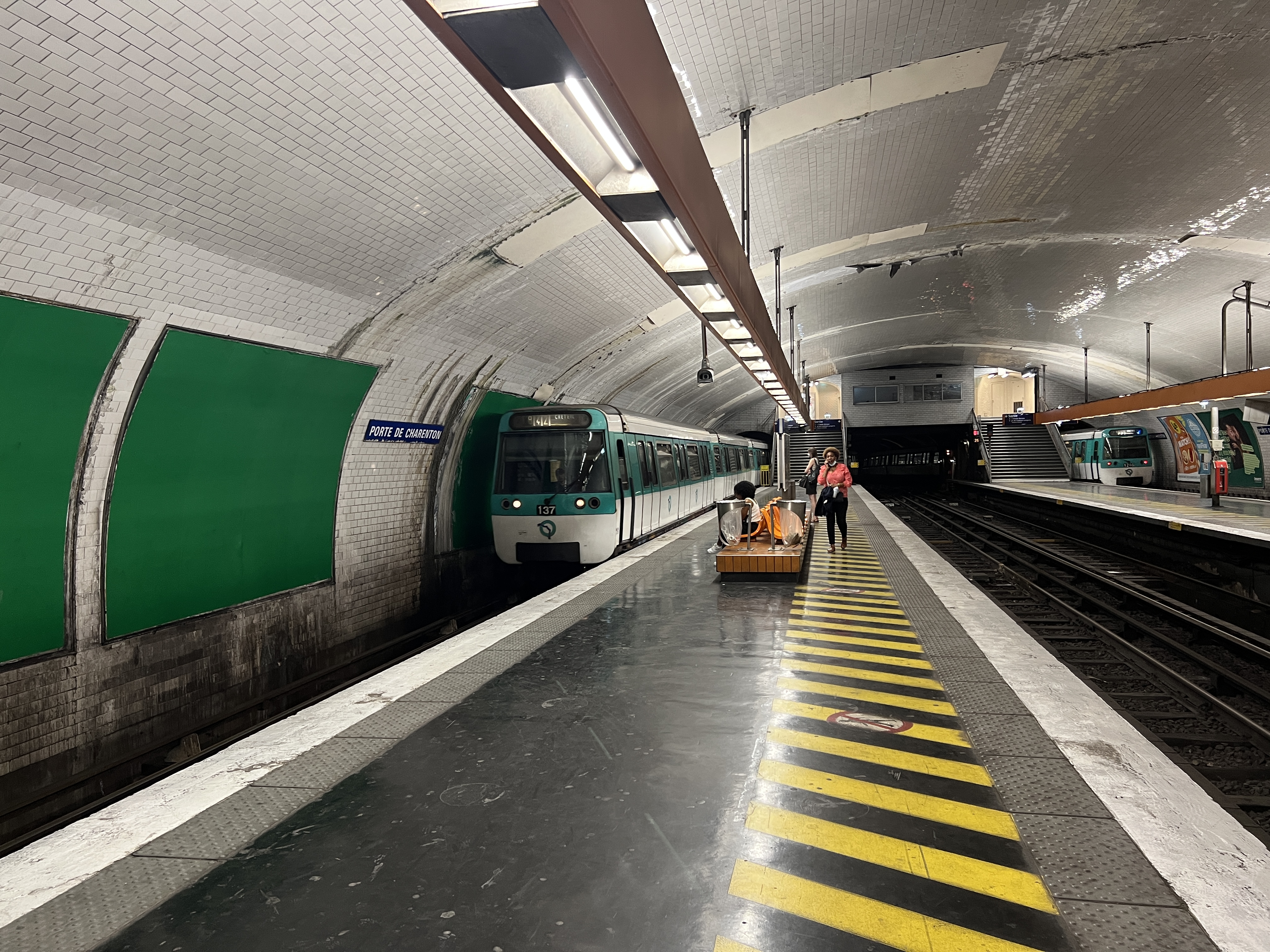

General information
- Location: 12th arrondissement of Paris; Île-de-France; France
- Coordinates: 48°49′58″N 2°24′01″E
- System: Paris Métro station
- Owner: RATP
- Operator: RATP
- Line: Paris Metro Paris Metro Line 8
- Platforms: 2
- Tracks: 4
- Connections: Tramways in Île-de-France Île-de-France tramway Line 3a

Construction
- Accessible: no

Other information
- Station code: 1303
- Fare zone: 1

History
- Opened: 5 May 1931

Passengers
- 2021: 1,529,778

Services
Preceding station	Paris Metro	Following station
Porte Dorée towards Balard	Line 8	Liberté towards Pointe du Lac
Preceding station	Tram	Following station
Baron Le Roy towards Pont du Garigliano	T3a	Porte Dorée towards Porte de Vincennes
Location
- Location within Paris

Porte de Charenton (French pronunciation: [pɔʁt də ʃaʁɑ̃tɔ̃]; lit. 'Gate of Charenton') is a station on Line 8 of the Paris Métro. Located in the 12th arrondissement, it is the final station before the line exits the City of Paris southeast towards Charenton-le-Pont.

== History ==
The station opened on 5 May 1931 with the extension of the line from Richelieu–Drouot for the Paris Colonial Exposition, held in the nearby Bois de Vincennes. It was the southeastern terminus of the line until its extension to Charenton–Écoles on 5 October 1942. It is named after the Porte de Charenton, a gate in the 19th-century Thiers wall of Paris on the road to Charenton-le-Pont.

An interchange with Île-de-France tramway Line 3a opened on 15 December 2012.

In 2021, the station was used by 1,529,778 passengers, making it the 231st busiest of the Métro network out of 304 stations.

The nearby Pelouse de Reuilly (part of the Bois de Vincennes) is the location of the Foire du Trône funfair in April and May.

== Passenger services ==
=== Access ===
The station has four access points. The first two, at the southwest end of the platforms, lead:

- at 68, Boulevard Poniatowski, alongside the Léo-Lagrange stadium;
- at 25, Boulevard Poniatowski.

The last two, at the northeast end of the platforms, allowing access to the Reuilly lawn, lead:

- at Boulevard Poniatowski on the even number side, near the corner with Place du Cardinal-Lavigerie;
- at 59, Boulevard Poniatowski. These two old emergency exits were renovated and put into service in 2020.

=== Station layout ===
Street Level

B1	Mezzanine

Platform level	Westbound	No regular service
Platform level	Island platform, doors will open on the right
Platform level	Westbound	← toward Balard (Porte Dorée)
Platform level	Eastbound	toward Pointe du Lac (Liberté) →
Platform level	Island platform, doors will open on the right
Platform level	Eastbound	No regular service

=== Platforms ===
Porte de Charenton is a station with a particular configuration. Due to its former status as a terminus, it has four tracks and two platforms, each of them being framed by two tracks. This rare arrangement can also be observed at Porte de Montreuil station . Trains usually serve the station via the side tracks. The central tracks only serve as a depot or in the event of an exceptional termination. These platforms are fitted out in the Andreu-Motte style with two orange light canopies, benches treated with brown flat tiles and orange Motte seats. These arrangements are combined with the flat white ceramic tiles which cover the walls and the particularly wide vault. The advertising frames are metal and the name of the station is written in capital letters on enameled plaques.

=== Other connections ===
The station is served by lines 77, 87 and 111 of the RATP bus network and at night, by line N35 of the Noctilien network.

Since 15 December 2012, it is also served by the T3a tramway after its extension from Porte d'Ivry.

== Gallery ==
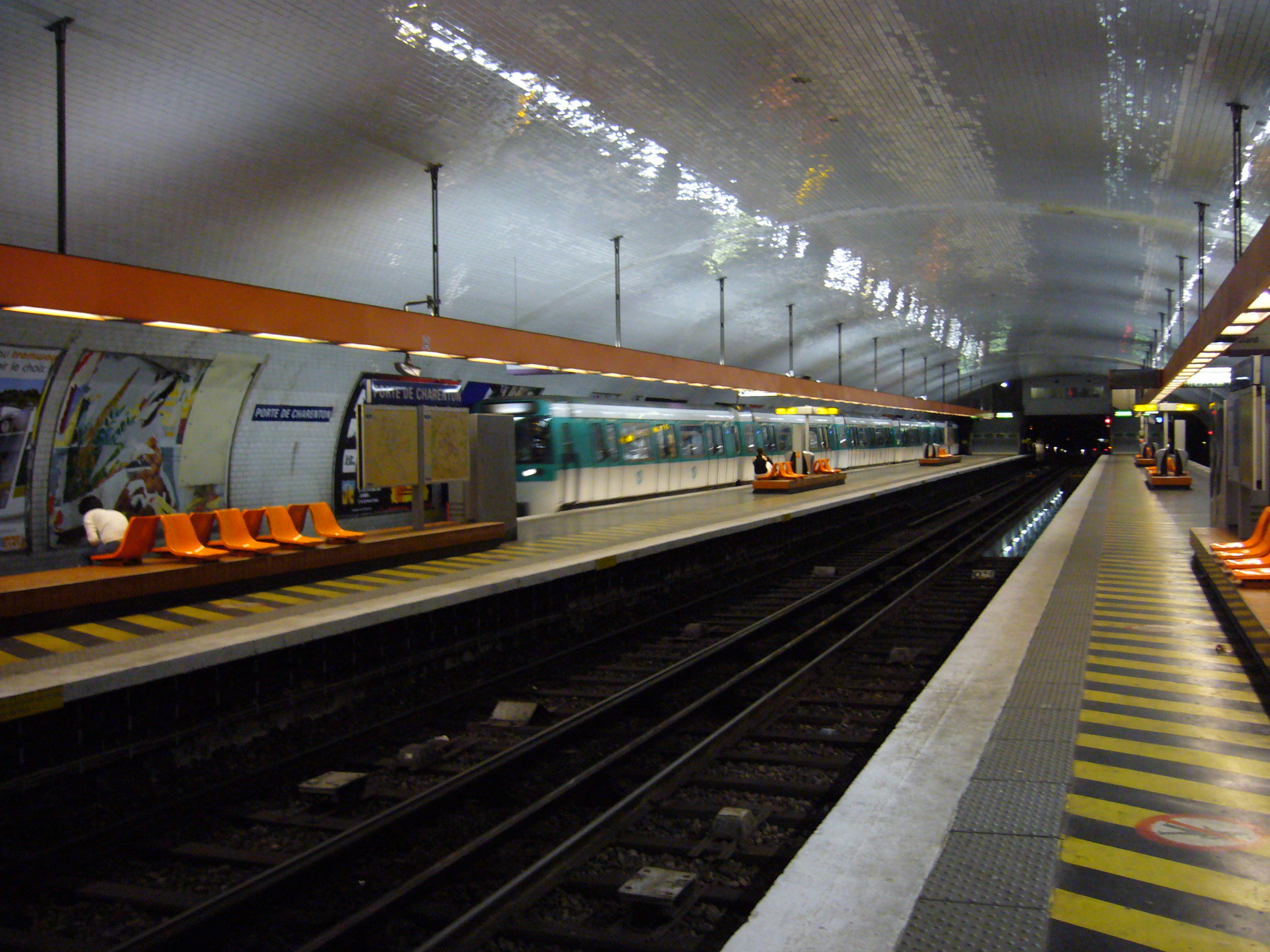
MF 77 rolling stock on Line 8 at Porte de Charenton in 2009

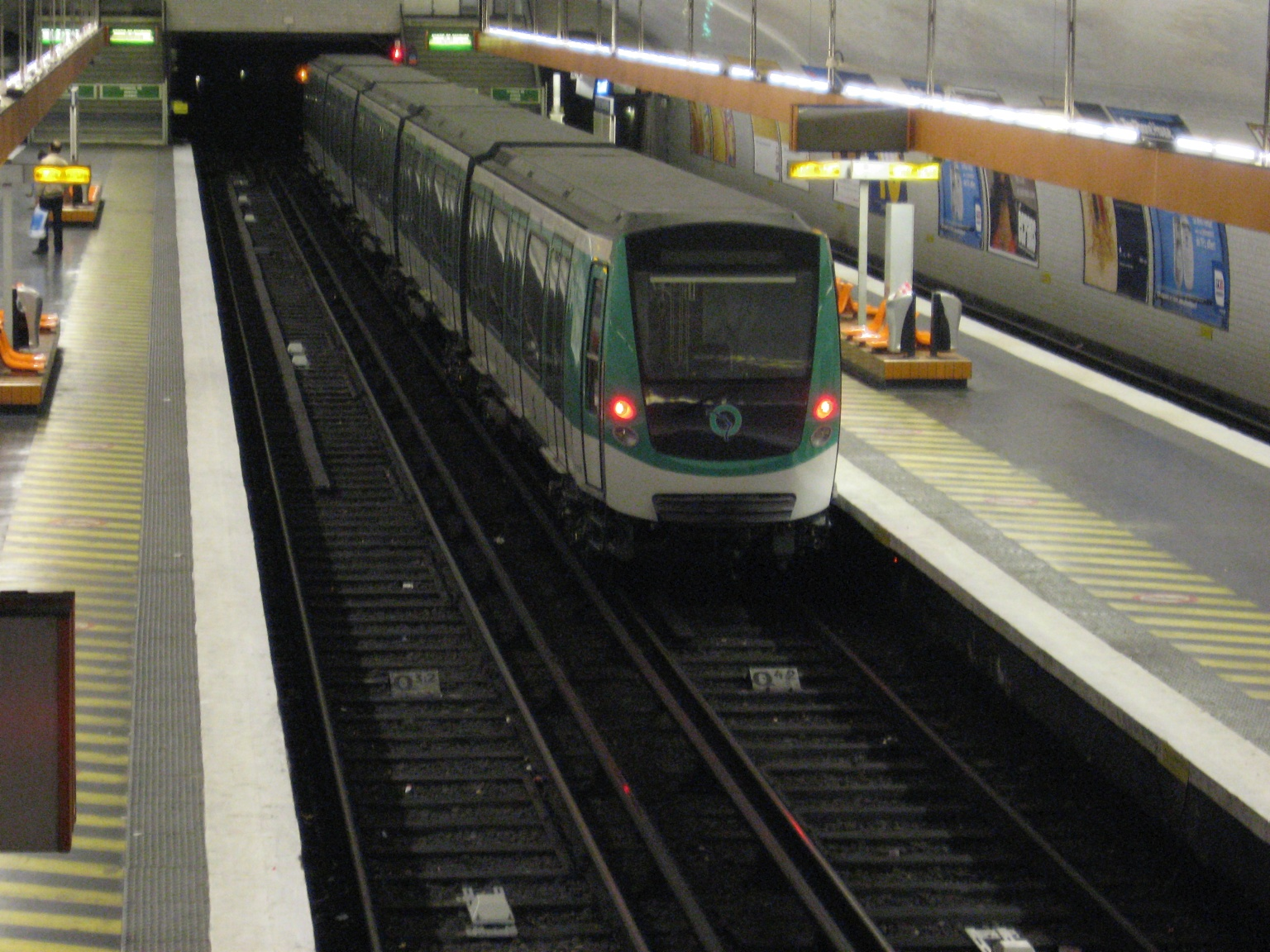
MF 2000 rolling stock on Line 8 at Porte de Charenton during its tests in 2006

== Sources ==
- Roland, Gérard (2003). Stations de métro. D'Abbesses à Wagram. Éditions Bonneton.
