= Charenton–Écoles station =

Metro station in Charenton-le-Pont, France

Charenton–Écoles Place Aristide Briand
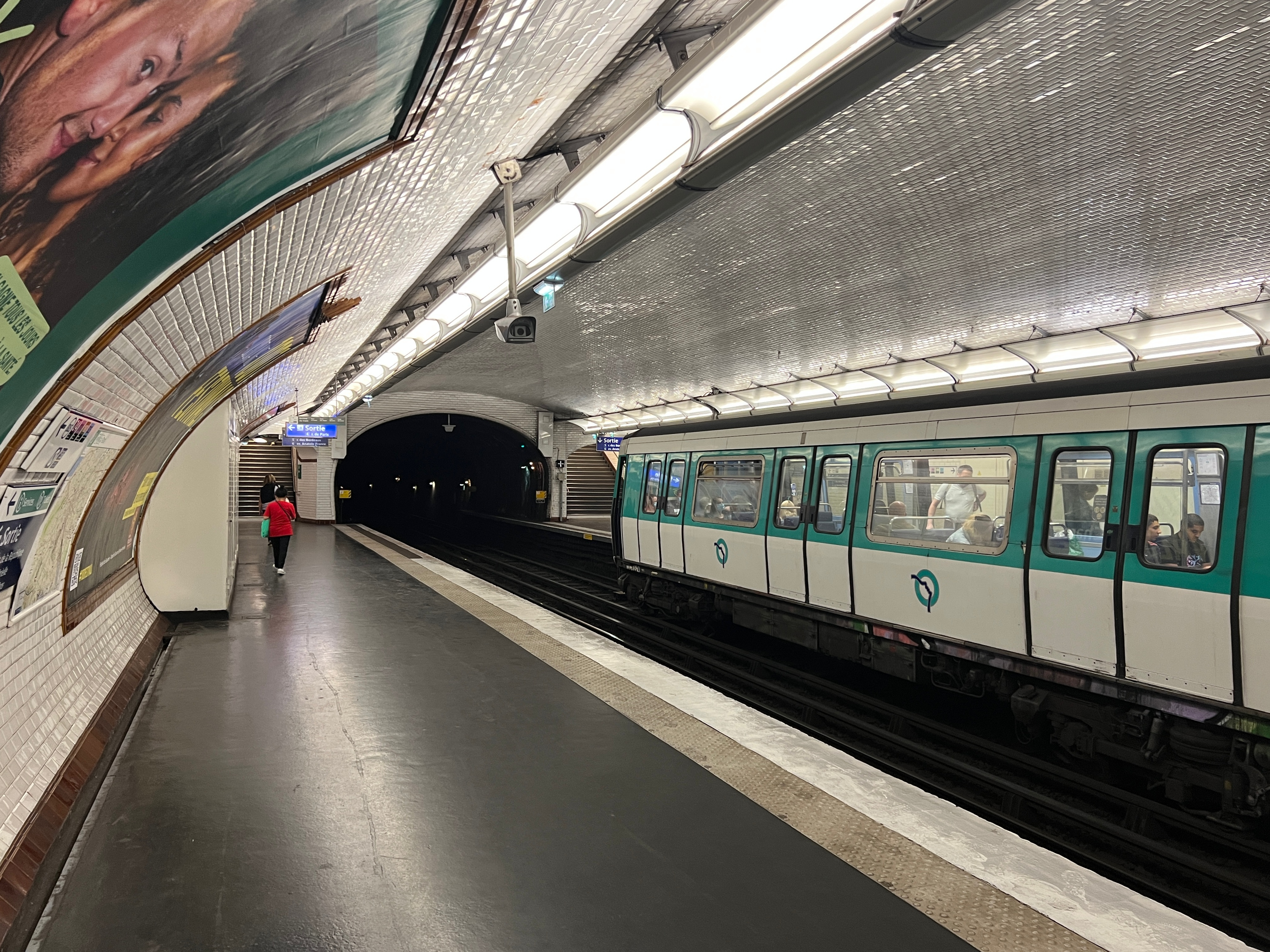
- MF 77 at Charenton–Écoles

General information
- Location: Charenton-le-Pont; Île-de-France; France
- Coordinates: 48°49′17″N 2°24′50″E
- System: Paris Métro station
- Owner: RATP
- Operator: RATP
- Line: Paris Metro Paris Metro Line 8
- Platforms: 2 (side platforms)
- Tracks: 2

Construction
- Accessible: no

Other information
- Station code: 25-13
- Fare zone: 2

History
- Opened: 5 October 1942

Passengers
- 2,164,023 (2021)

Services
Preceding station	Paris Metro	Following station
Liberté towards Balard	Line 8	École Vétérinaire de Maisons-Alfort towards Pointe du Lac
Location
- Location within Paris

Charenton–Écoles (French pronunciation: [ʃaʁɑ̃tɔ̃ ekɔl], lit. 'Charenton–Schools') is a station on Line 8 of the Paris Métro in the suburban commune of Charenton-le-Pont. It is one of two Métro stations located in the commune, the other being Liberté on the same line. It is named after the commune it is situated in, as well as the nearby École élémentaire Aristide Briand (Aristide Briand Elementary School), located along Place Aristide-Briand.

== History ==
The station opened on 5 October 1942 as part of the extension of the line from Porte de Charenton, serving as its eastern terminus until it was further extended to Maisons-Alfort–Stade on 19 September 1970. The construction of the extension resulted in the destruction of Hôtel du Plessis-Bellière in 1937, now the site of Place de Valois.

On 14 August 2006, a former underground quarry caused the collapse of part of the square in front of Église Saint-Pierre de Charenton-le-Pont, a church, located above one of the corridors of the station. It damaged the station's roof and caused a water pipe to burst. Service on the line was not disrupted.

In 2019, the station was used by 2,984,929 passengers, making it the 175th busiest of the Métro network out of 302 stations.

In 2020, the station was used by 1,654,160 passengers amidst the COVID-19 pandemic, making it the 155th busiest of the Métro network out of 304 stations.

In 2021, the station was used by 2,164,023 passengers, making it the 164th busiest of the Métro network out of 304 stations.

== Passenger services ==
=== Access ===
The station has 6 accesses:

- Access 1: rue de la République
- Access 2: rue Gabrielle
- Access 3: rue de Conflans
- Access 4: rue de Paris (an ascending escalator)
- Access 5: rue des Bordeaux
- Access 6: avenue Anatole France

=== Station layout ===
Street Level
B1	Mezzanine
Platform level	Side platform, doors will open on the right
Platform level	Westbound	← toward Balard (Liberté)
Platform level	Eastbound	toward Pointe du Lac (École Vétérinaire de Maisons-Alfort) →
Platform level	Side platform, doors will open on the right

=== Platforms ===
The station has a standard configuration with 2 tracks surrounded by 2 side platforms. It is the last station on the line towards Pointe du Lac with the traditional design found on the majority of the stations on the network (i.e. white bevelled tiles, elliptical platform vault).

=== Other connections ===
The station is also served by lines 24, 111, 180, and 325 of the RATP bus network, and at night, by line N35 of the Noctilien bus network.

== Nearby ==
- Bois de Vincennes
- Église Saint-Pierre de Charenton-le-Pont

== Gallery ==
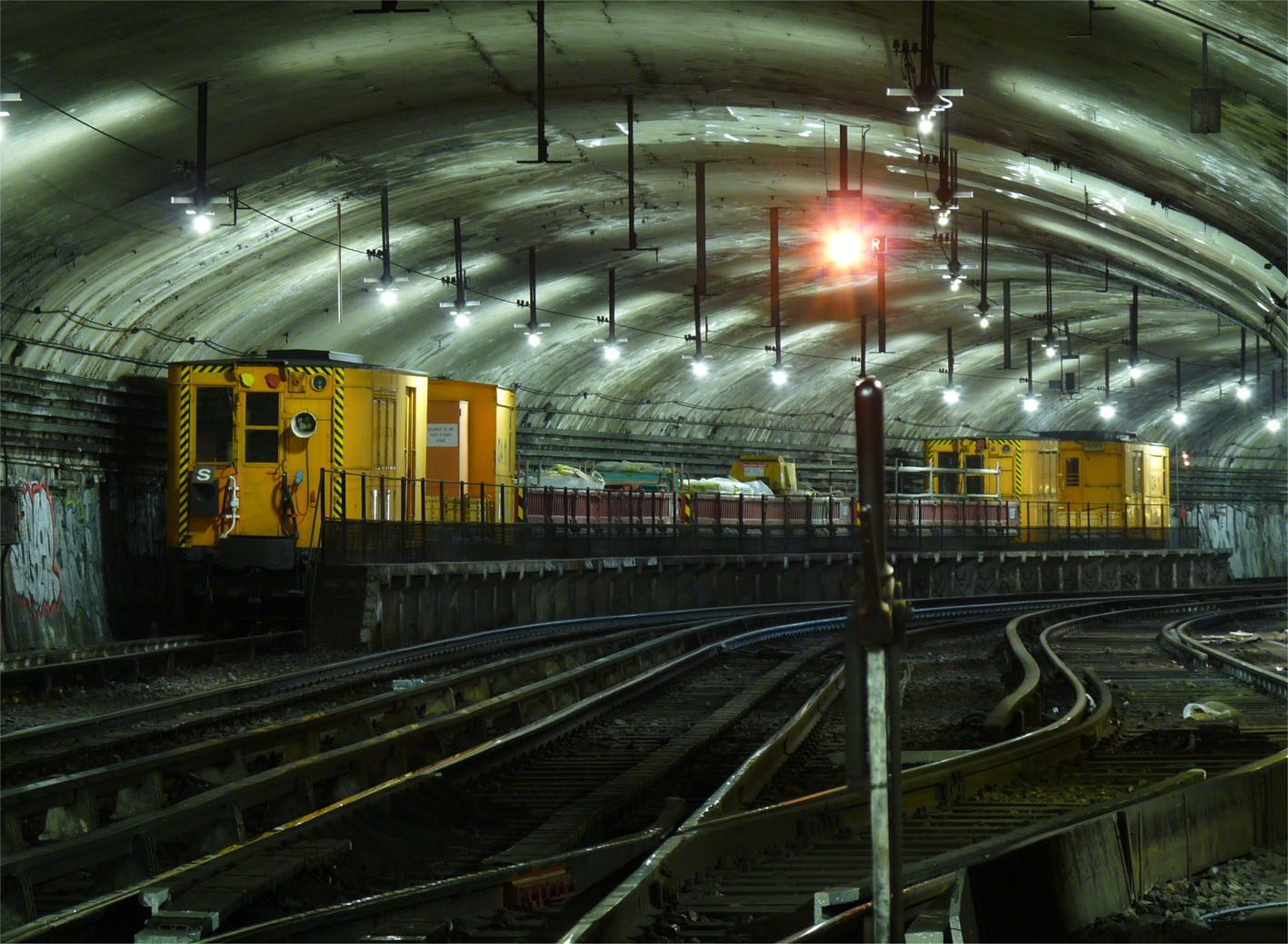
A maintenance train along the yard tracks south of the station

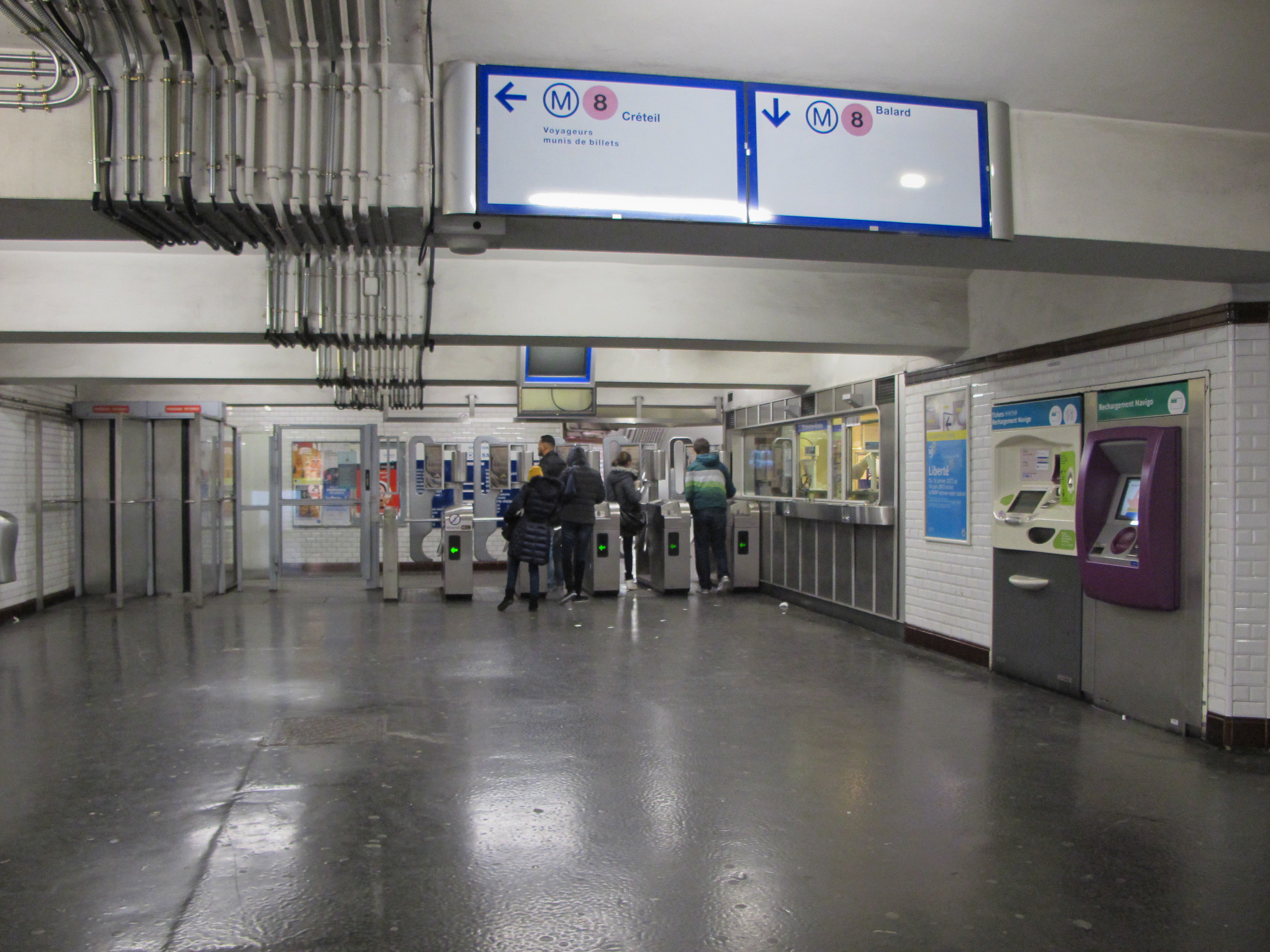
Ticket barriers at the mezzanine

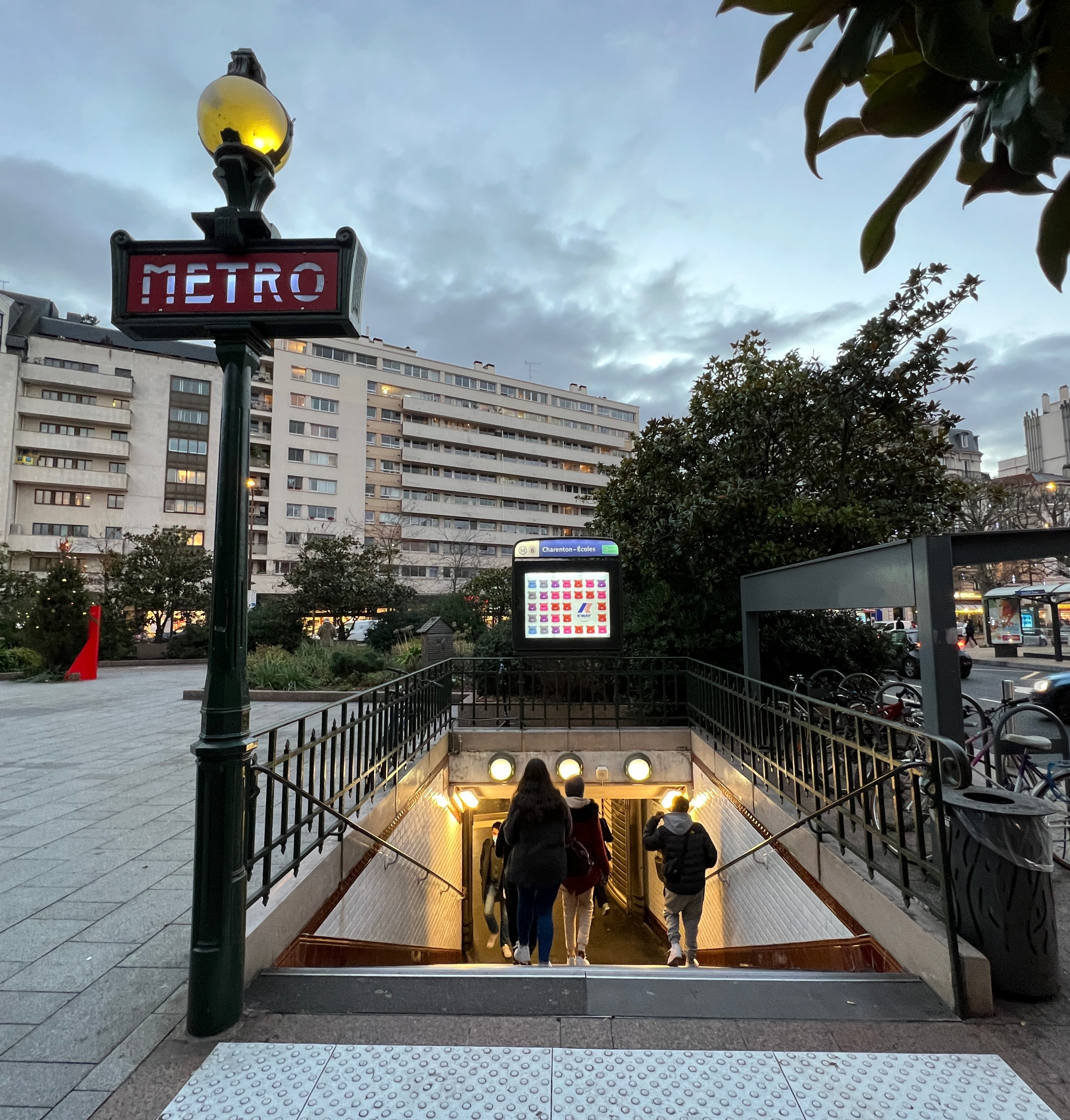
Access 1

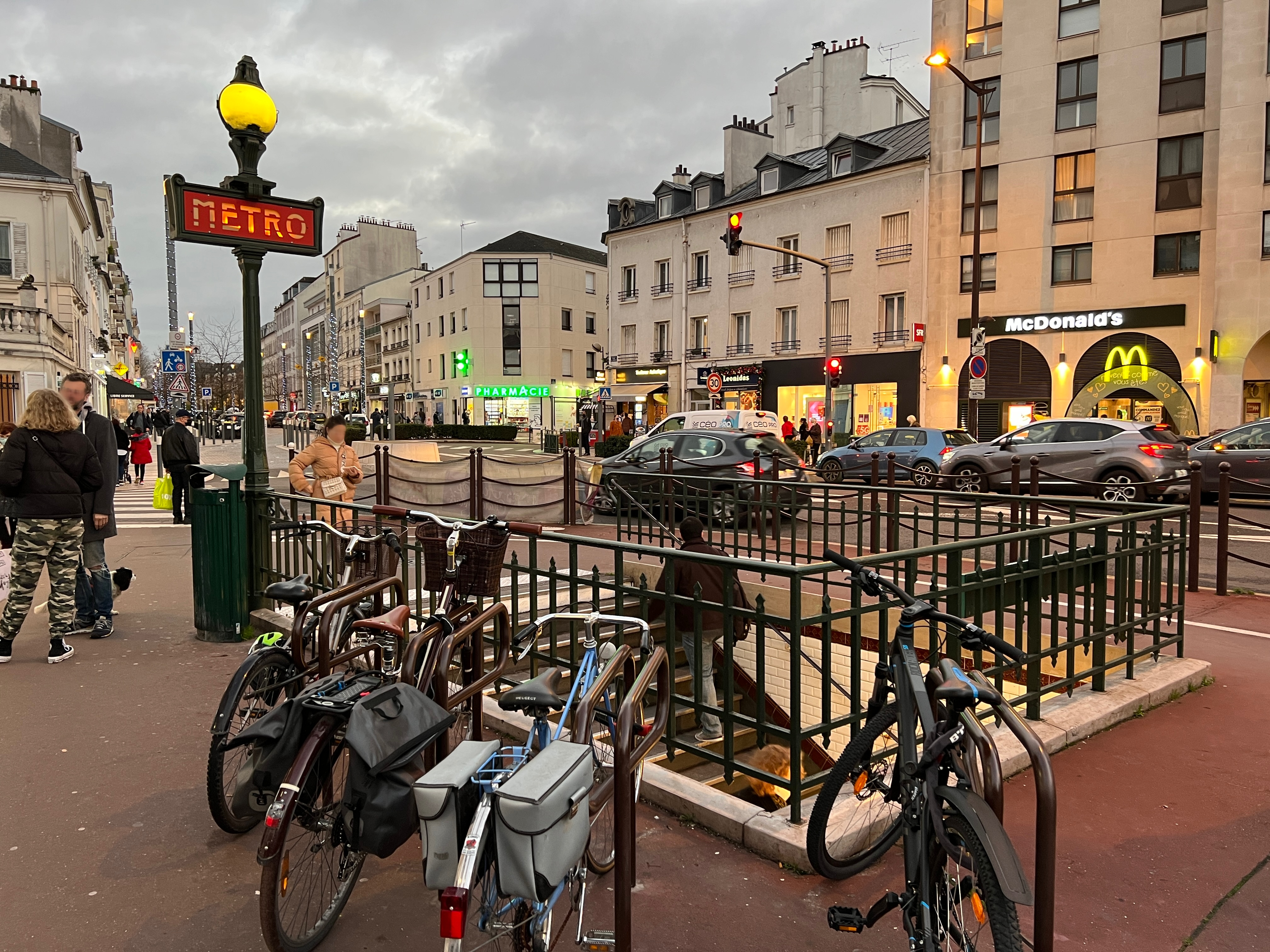
Access 2

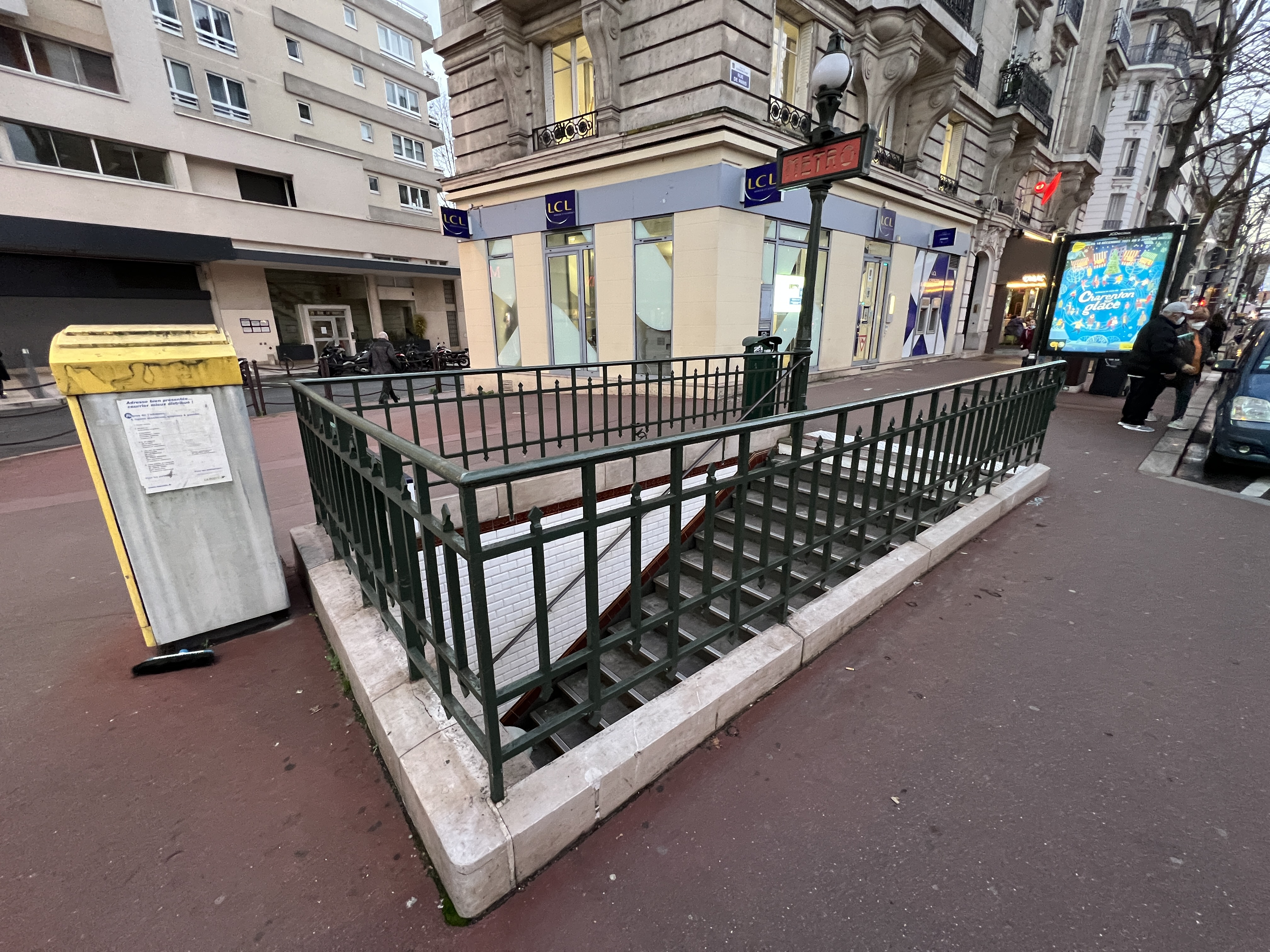
Access 3

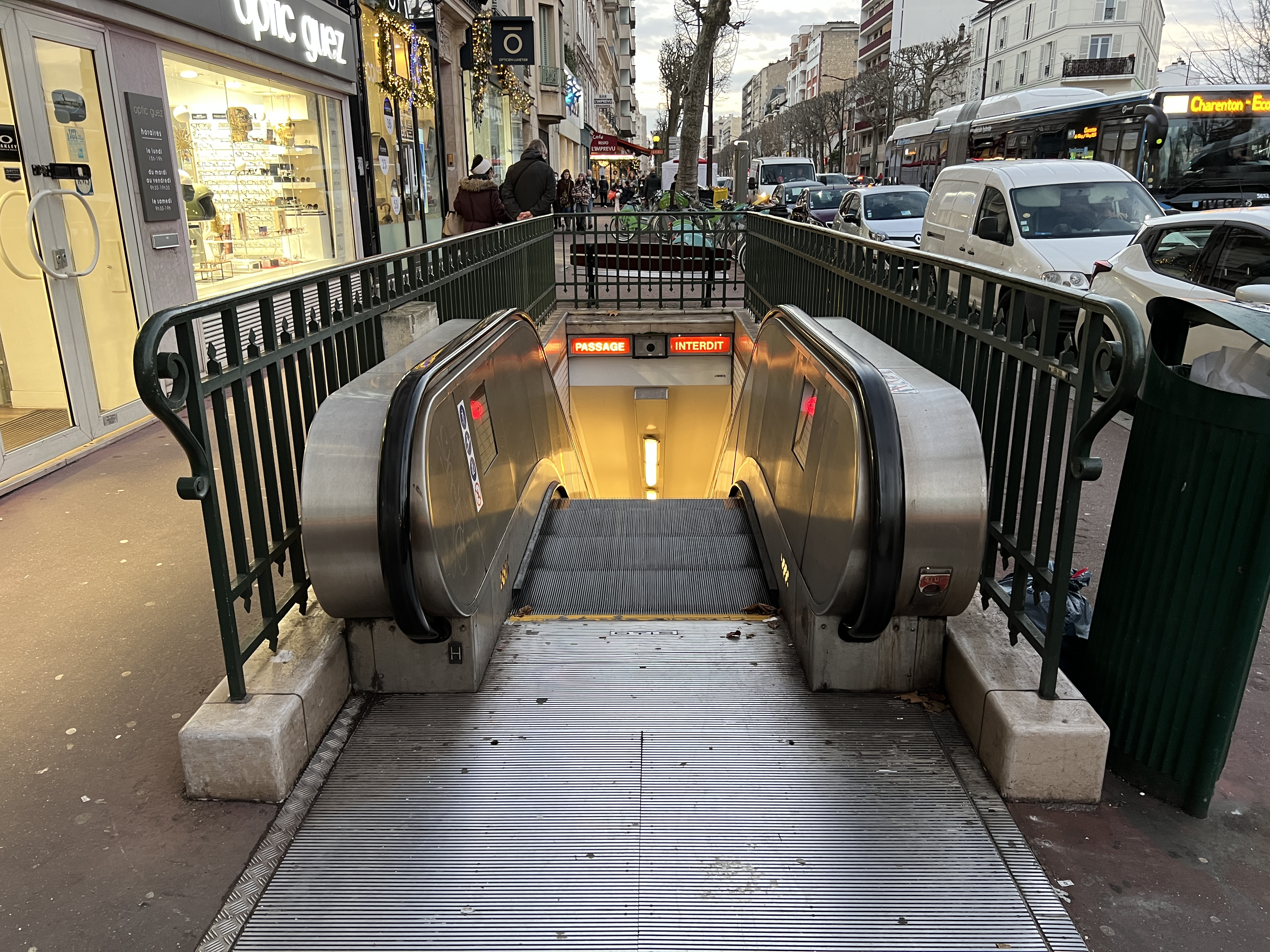
Access 4

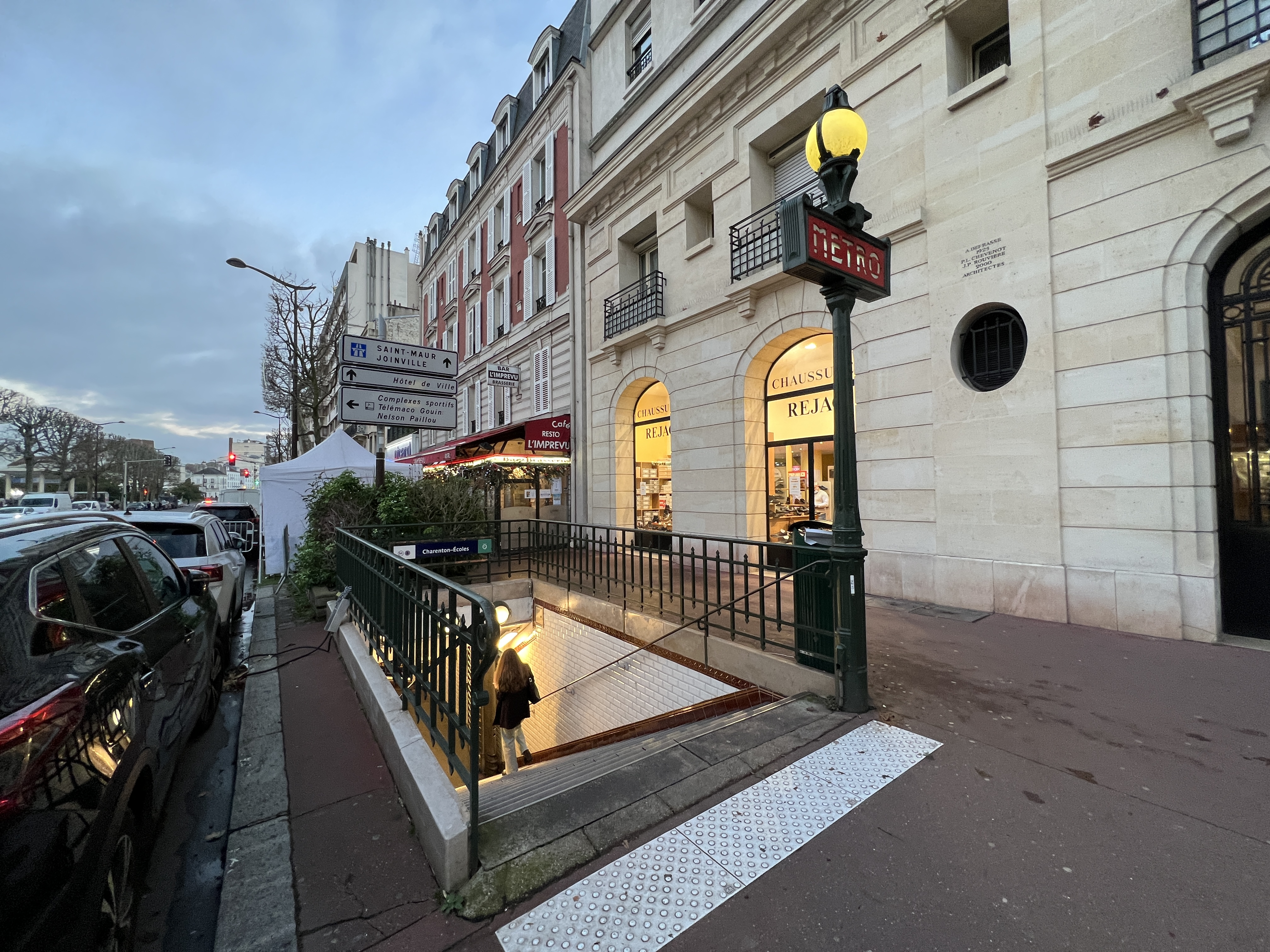
Access 5

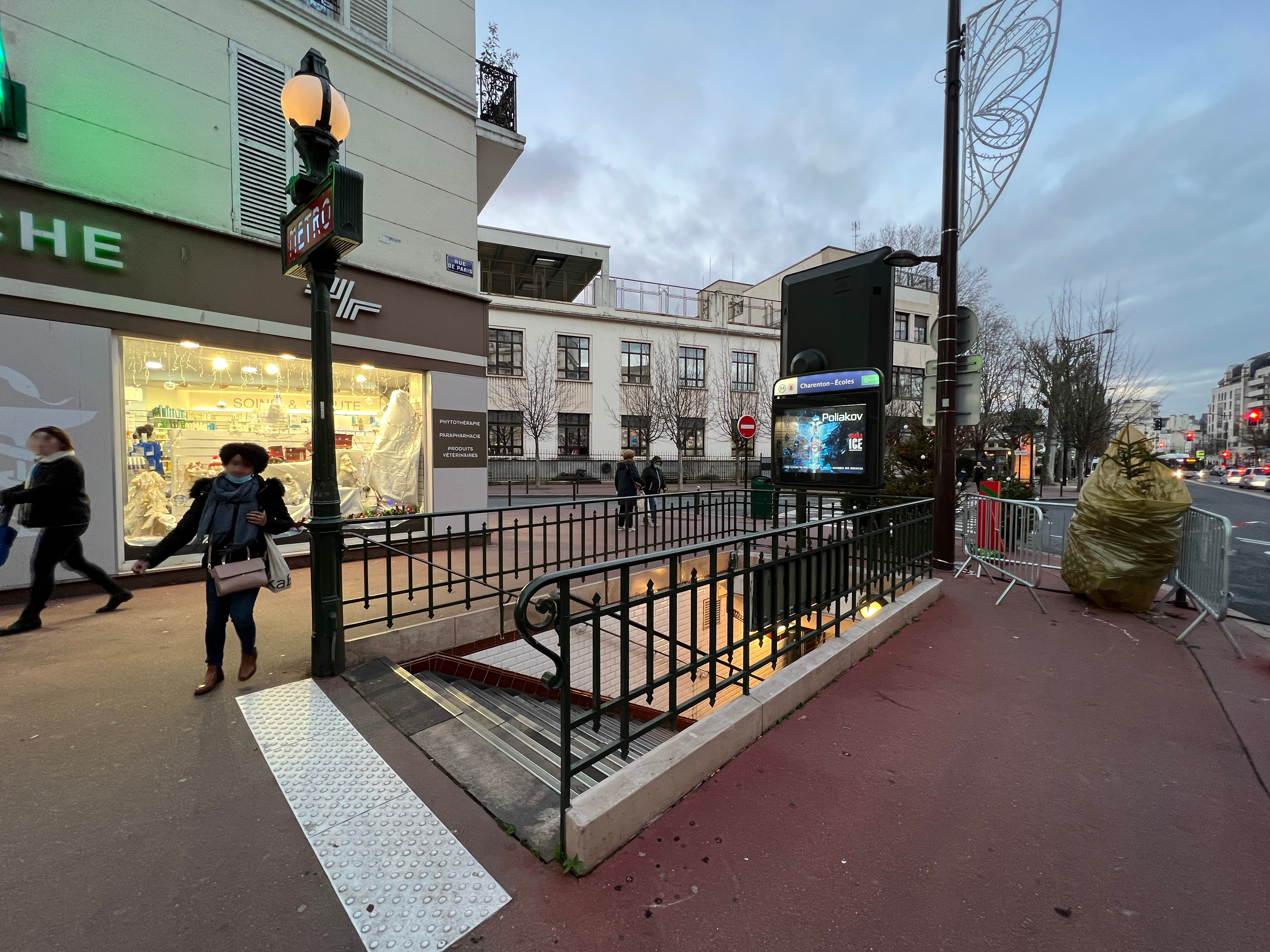
Access 6
