= Alfort =

Alfort may refer to:

- École nationale vétérinaire d'Alfort, school of veterinary medicine in Val-de-Marne, Île-de-France, France
  - Jardin botanique de l'École nationale vétérinaire d'Alfort, botanical garden operated by the École Nationale Vétérinaire
  - Musée Fragonard d'Alfort, museum of anatomical oddities located at within the École Nationale Vétérinaire
- Alfort Smith (1846–1908), English cricketer
- Maisons-Alfort, commune in the southeastern suburbs of Paris, France
