= Hôtel de Ville, Alfortville =

Town hall in Alfortville, France

Hôtel de Ville
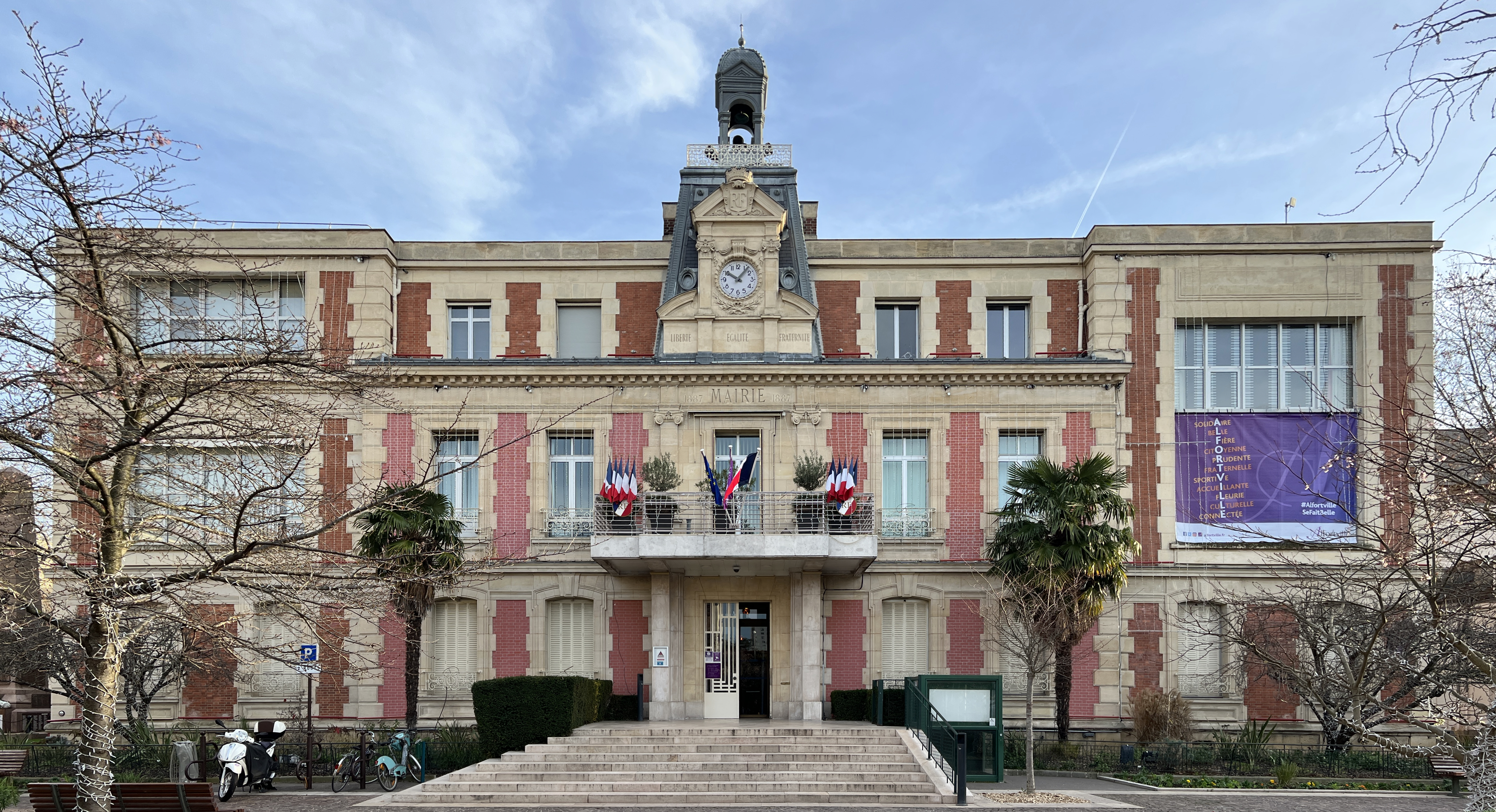
- The main frontage of the Hôtel de Ville in January 2023
- Interactive map of the Hôtel de Ville area

General information
- Type: City hall
- Architectural style: Neoclassical style
- Location: Alfortville, France
- Coordinates: 48.8054°N 2.4203°E
- Completed: 1887

Design and construction
- Architect: Jean-Baptiste Preux

The Hôtel de Ville (French pronunciation: [otɛl də vil], City Hall) is a municipal building in Alfortville, Val-de-Marne, in the southern suburbs of Paris, standing on Place François-Mitterrand. It has been included on the Inventaire général des monuments by the French Ministry of Culture since 1982.

== History ==
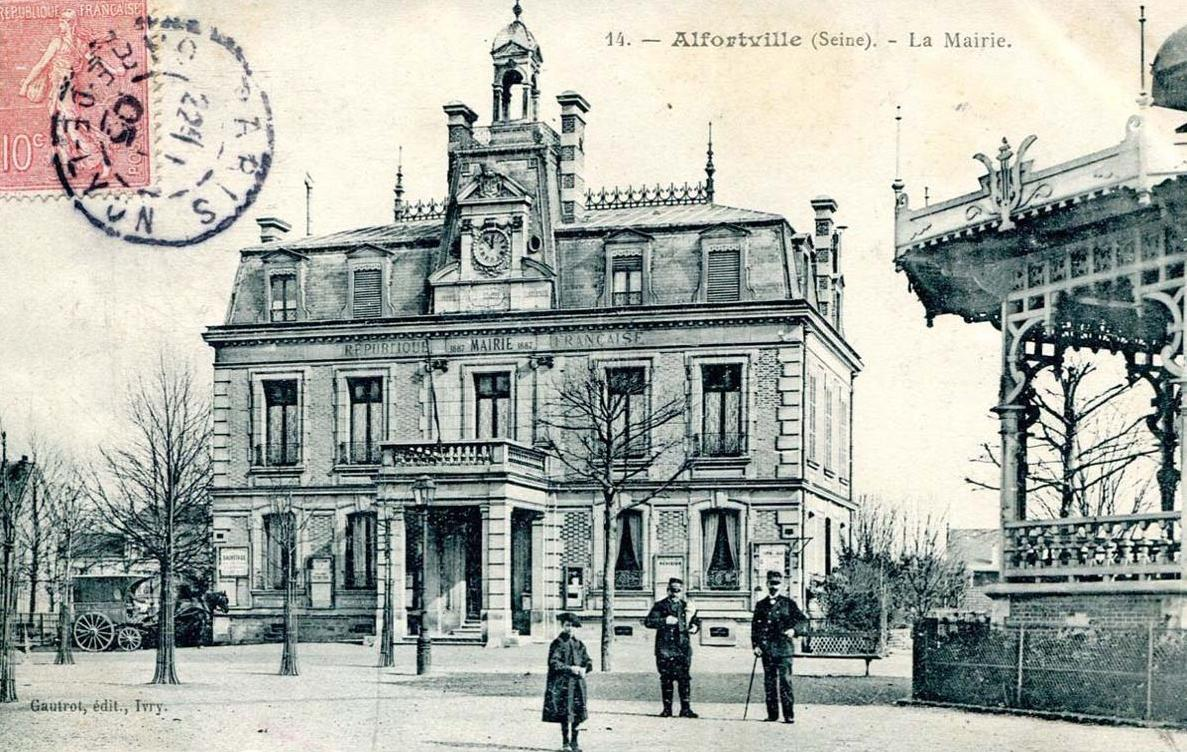
The building as seen in 1905

The village of Alfort became separated from the rest of Maisons-Alfort when the Paris–Marseille railway, which bisected Maisons-Alfort, opened in 1856. Following a significant increase in the population, the part of Maisons-Alfort on the west side of the railway was split off and became the commune of Alfortville in 1885.

In September 1886, the new town council led by the mayor, Jean-Baptiste Surloppe, decided to commission a town hall for the new commune. The site they selected was in the centre of the village. Other structures commissioned in the same area included the cemetery, which was completed in 1888, and the Church of Notre-Dame, which was completed in 1891.

The new town hall was designed by Jean-Baptiste Preux in the neoclassical style, built in red brick with stone dressings and was completed in 1887. The original design involved a symmetrical main frontage of five bays facing onto Rue des Coquelicots (now Rue Jules Cuillerier). The central bay featured a porch formed by a pair of stone columns supporting an entablature and a balustraded balcony. There was a French door with a stone surround and a hood mould on the first floor and, at roof level, there was a clock flanked by pilasters supporting a triangular pediment. There was a lantern behind the clock. The other bays were fenestrated by segmental headed windows with stone surrounds and keystones on the ground floor and by square headed windows with stone surrounds and hood moulds on the first floor. Two wings, which were slightly projected forward, were added in 1922 and the original hipped roof was replaced by an attic floor in 1934.

Internally, the principal rooms were the Salle du Conseil (council chamber) and the Salle des Mariages (wedding room) in the south wing. The rooms were decorated with seven murals by Henri Dieupart. A late-19th century painting by Raoul Arus, depicting pontoon manoeuvres on the Marne, was also installed in the wedding room.

After the First World War, a war memorial, formed by an obelisk together with a sculpture depicting a dying soldier being attended by a female figure, was unveiled at Quai Blanqui, before being relocated to an area to the immediate north of the town hall in 1967. In November 2015, a ceremony was held outside the town hall to commemorate the lives of local people killed in the November 2015 Paris attacks.
