= Maisons-Alfort–Stade station =

Metro station in Maisons-Alfort, France

Maisons-Alfort–Stade
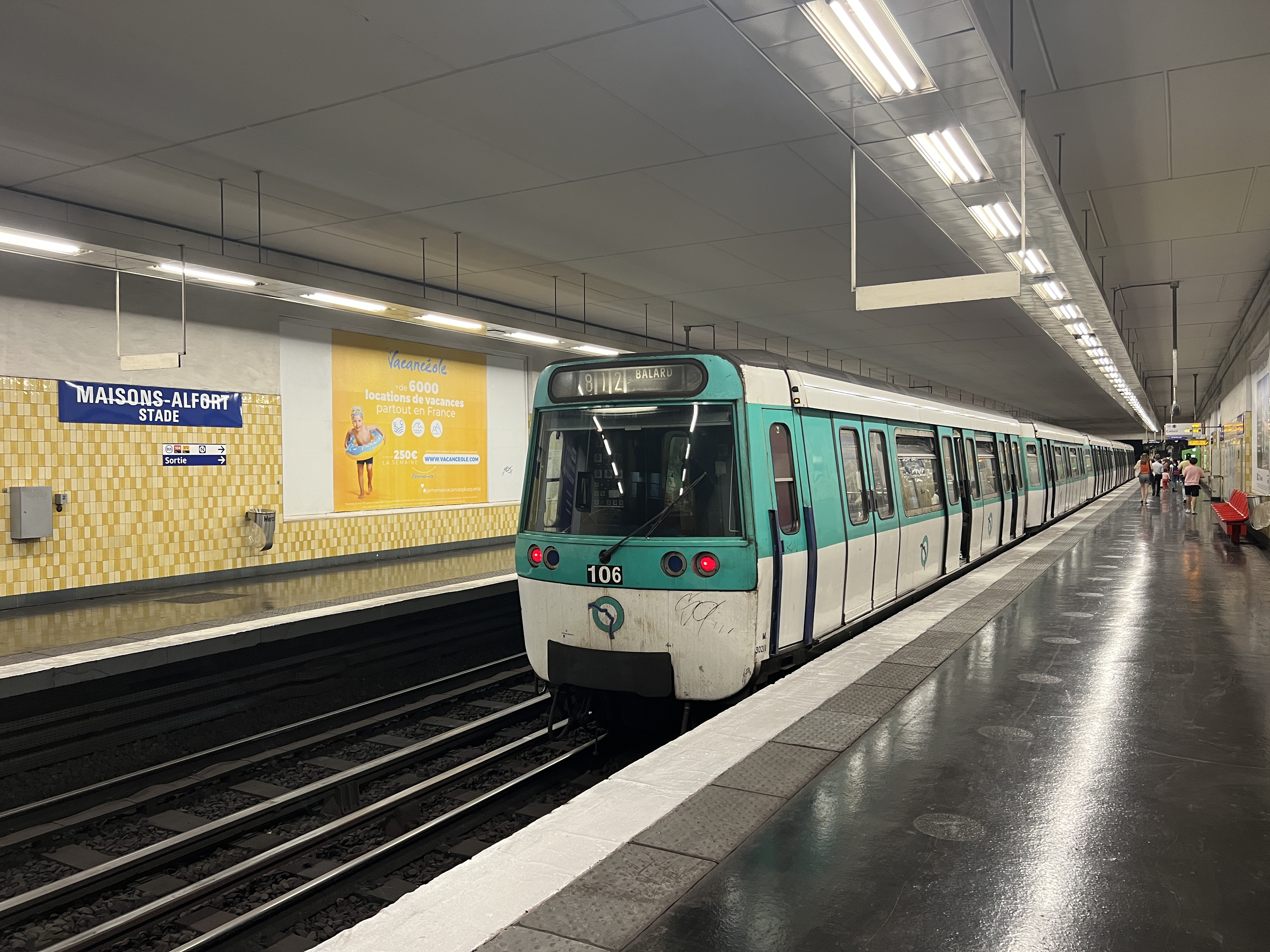
- MF 77 at Maisons-Alfort–Stade

General information
- Location: Maisons-Alfort; Île-de-France; France
- Coordinates: 48°48′31″N 2°26′10″E
- System: Paris Métro station
- Owner: RATP
- Operator: RATP
- Line: Paris Metro Paris Metro Line 8
- Platforms: 2 (side platforms)
- Tracks: 2

Construction
- Accessible: no

Other information
- Station code: 2515
- Fare zone: 3

History
- Opened: 19 September 1970

Passengers
- 1,702,479 (2021)

Services
Preceding station	Paris Metro	Following station
École Vétérinaire de Maisons-Alfort towards Balard	Line 8	Maisons-Alfort–Les Juilliottes towards Pointe du Lac
Location
- Location within Paris

Maisons-Alfort–Stade (French pronunciation: [mɛzɔ̃ alfɔʁ stad]; lit. 'Maisons-Alfort–Stadium') is a station on Line 8 of the Paris Métro in the suburban commune of Maisons-Alfort. It is named after the commune it is situated in, as well as after the Stade de la Suze (1935–1970) which still existed when the station was built in 1969 and was replaced a year later by the Métropolis building complex.

This lost stadium is the very reason why the platforms have a set of stairs going nowhere on the opposite hand of the platform exit, the construction of the obsolete access to the stadium having been aborted soon before the opening to the public. This northwest access and mezzanine for ticket barriers thus remained blind and were later converted for staff use. The situation is comparable to Porte Molitor station that as no access, being originally intended for Parc des Princes. The name of the station didn't change due to the nearby Stade Auguste Delaune that filled the void.

== History ==
The station opened on 19 September 1970 as part of the extension of the line from Charenton–Écoles, serving as its eastern terminus until it was further extended to Maisons-Alfort–Les Juilliottes on 27 April 1972. This began a new wave of network expansions after an 18-year break due to limited financial resources during the post-war period. It marks the first appearance of "box stations", characterised by its rectangular shape due its cut-and-cover method of construction.

In 2019, the station was used by 2,330,375 passengers, making it the 221st busiest of the Métro network out of 302 stations.

In 2020, the station was used by 1,393,467 passengers amidst the COVID-19 pandemic, making it the 186th busiest of the Métro network out of 304 stations.

In 2021, the station was used by 1,702,479 passengers, making it the 208th busiest of the Métro network out of 304 stations.

== Passenger services ==
=== Access ===
The station has 2 accesses:

- Access 1: avenue du Général Leclerc côté des numéros impairs
- Access 2: avenue du Général Leclerc côté des numéros pairs (with an ascending escalator)
- Access “Stade de la Suze” was never completed (what's left of it is a set of stairs and a mezzanine for ticket barriers on the opposite hand of the platform exit) since the stadium was destroyed to build the Métropolis building complex soon before the station opened to public.

=== Station layout ===
Street Level
B1	Mezzanine
Platform level	Side platform, doors will open on the right
Platform level	Westbound	← toward Balard (École Vétérinaire de Maisons-Alfort)
Platform level	Eastbound	toward Pointe du Lac (Maisons-Alfort–Les Juilliottes) →
Platform level	Side platform, doors will open on the right

=== Platforms ===
The station has a standard configuration with 2 tracks surrounded by 2 side platforms. Built in the 1970s, it is a cage station with vertical walls and a horizontal ceiling due to its cut-and-cover construction. The decoration, typical of this decade, is similar to a variation of the Mouton-Duvernet style with walls and tunnel exits covered with hollow patterned tiles in various shades of ochre, placed vertically and aligned, as well as a ceiling and wall tops treated in white. Lighting is provided by two suspended canopies that can also be found at the next station, École Vétérinaire de Maisons-Alfort, as well as at the Porte de Bagnolet station on line 3 (in addition, the Gambetta station on the latter line was equipped with the same model of canopy until its renovation in 2007). The advertising frames, slightly recessed in the walls, are metal and the name of the station is inscribed in Parisine font on enamelled plaques. The seats are Motte style in red.

The station shares this decorative style only with the two framing stopping points, École Vétérinaire de Maisons-Alfort and Maisons-Alfort-Les Juiliottes. However, ochre-coloured tiles also exist in the access corridors to the platform of the Créteil-Université station on the same line, except that they only have the lightest shade.

=== Other connections ===
The station is also served by lines 104 and 372 of the RATP bus network, and at night, by line N35 of the Noctilien bus network.

== Nearby ==
- Cimetière de Maisons-Alfort
- Collège Edouard Herriot
- Fort de Charenton
- Stade Auguste Delaune

== Gallery ==
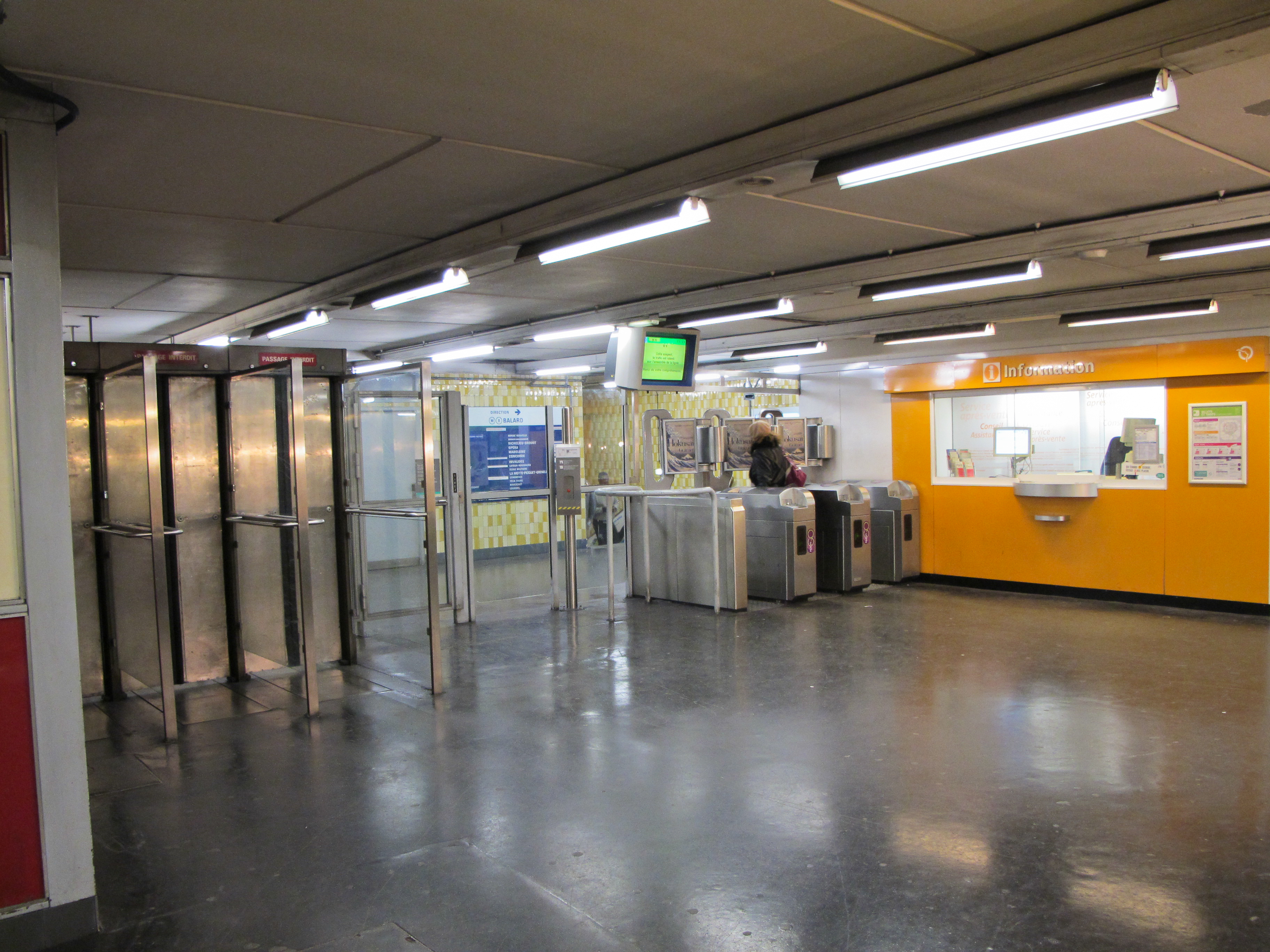
Ticket barriers at the mezzanine

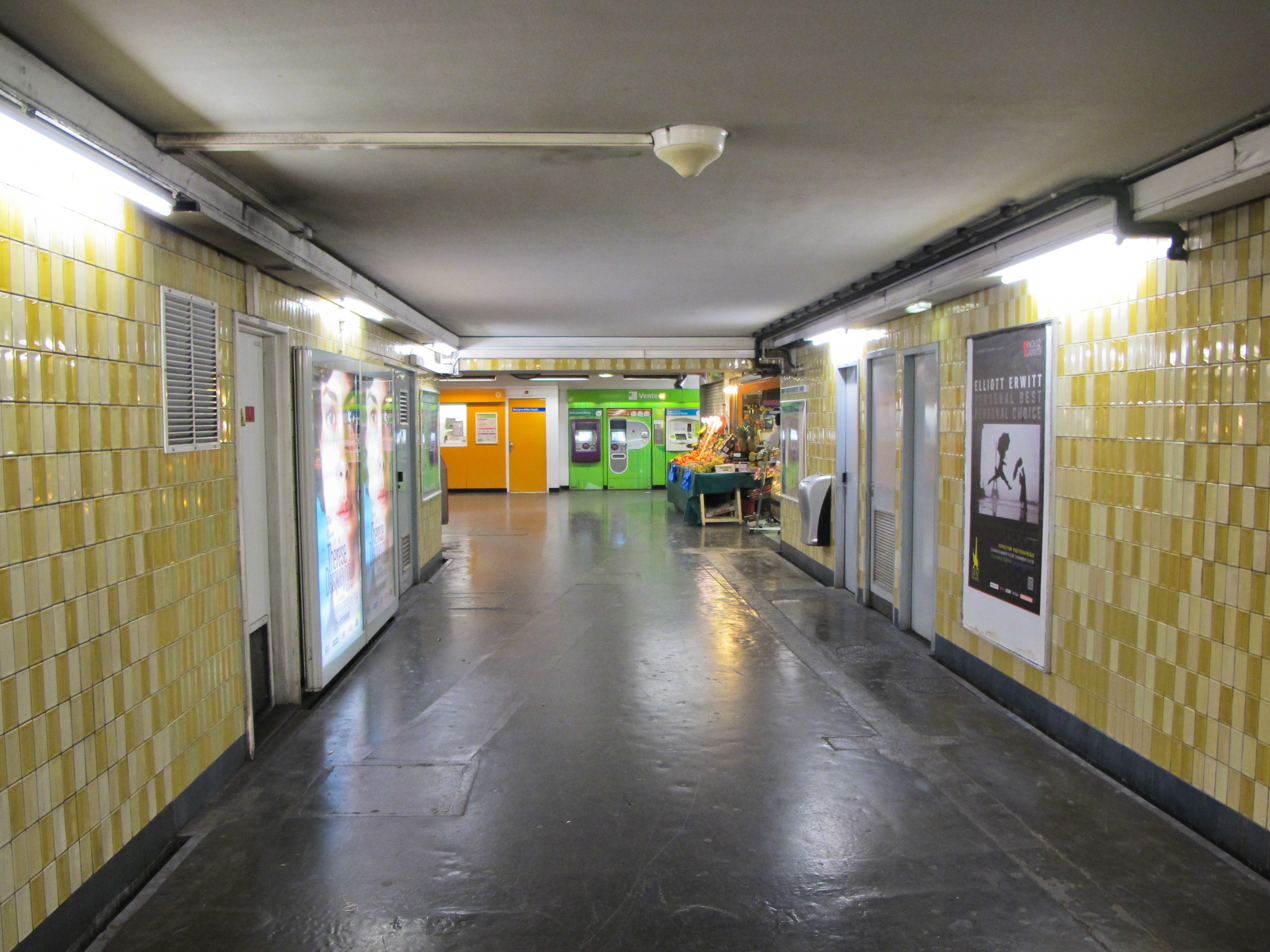
Corridors

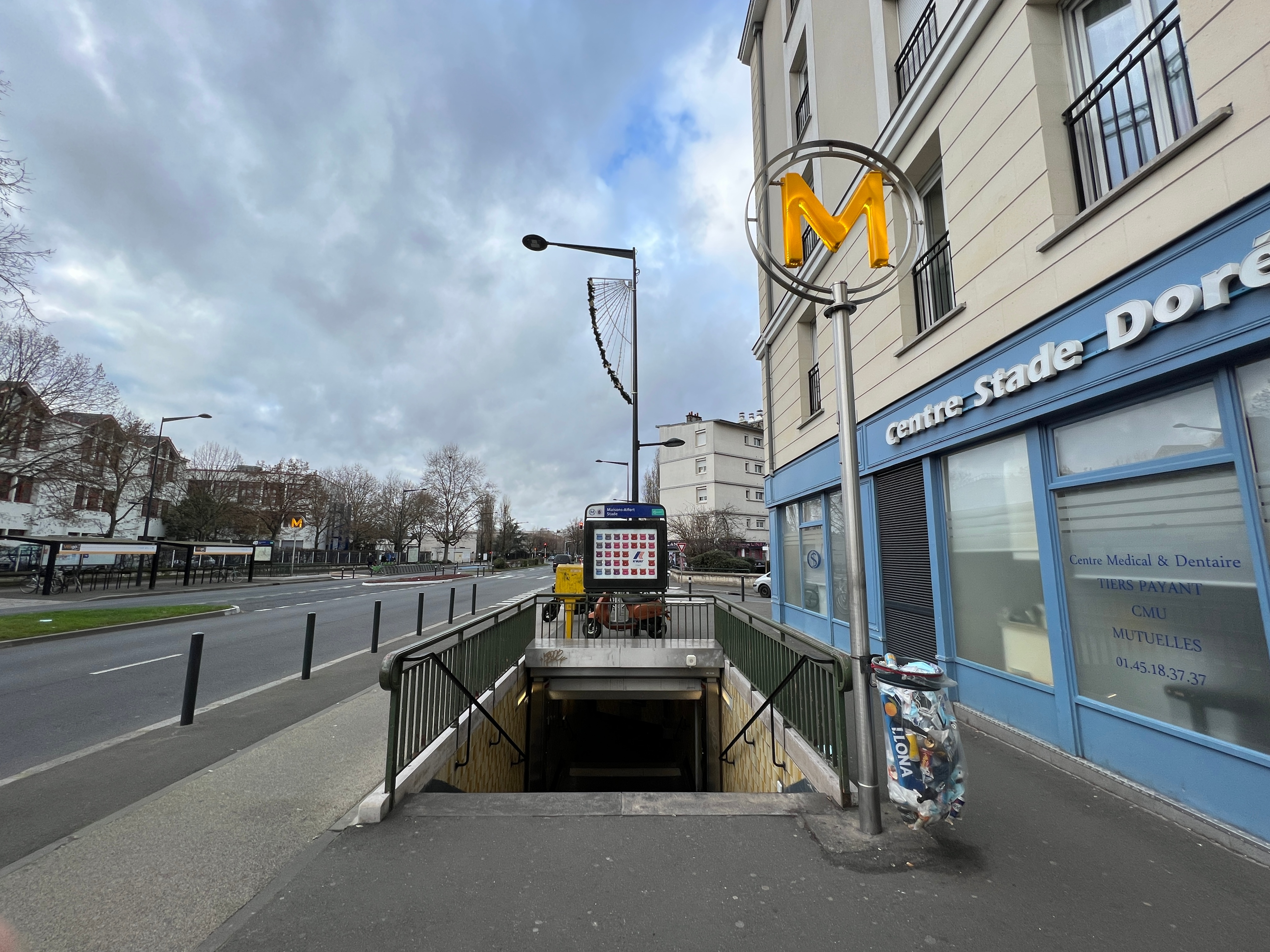
Access 1

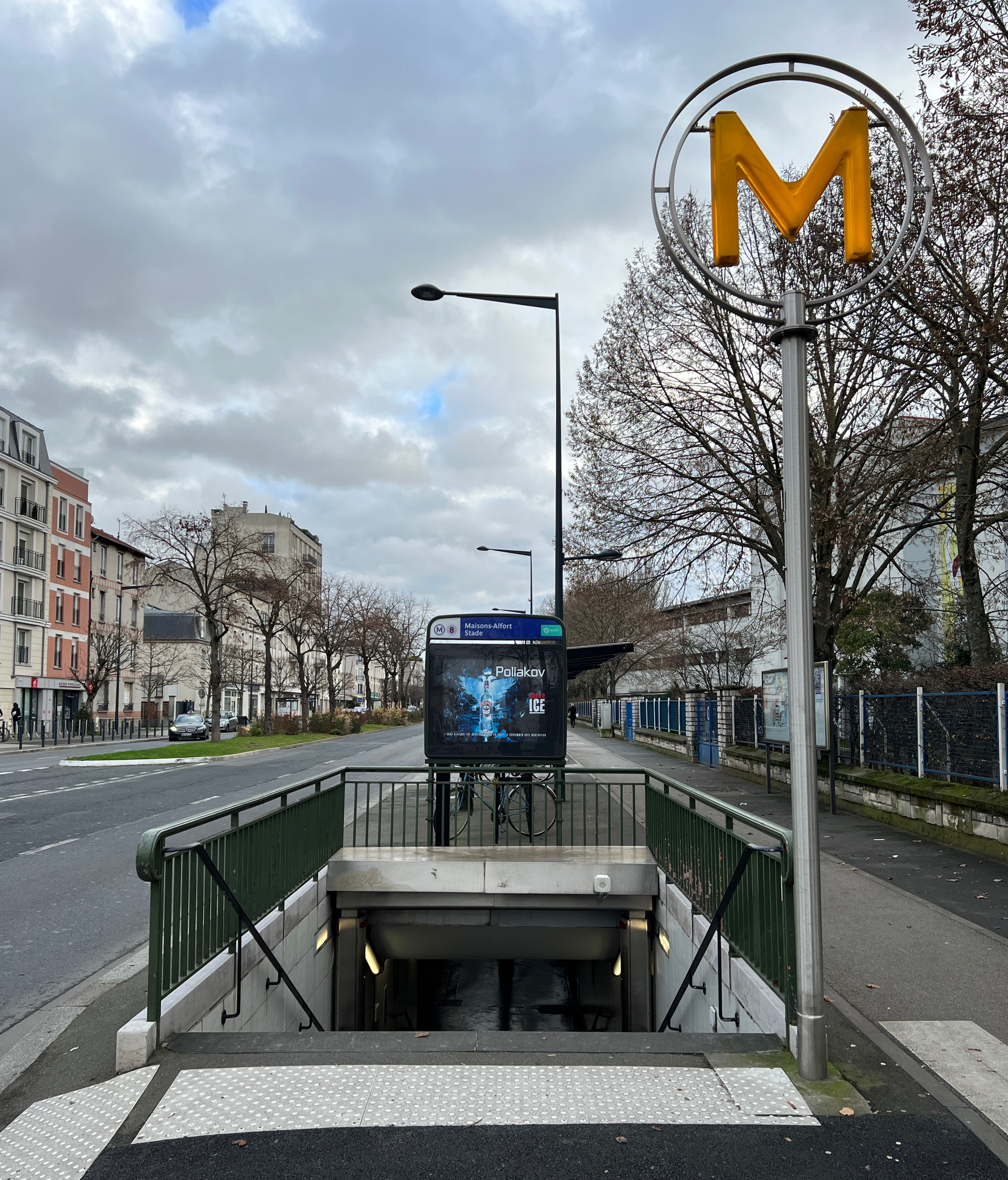
Access 2

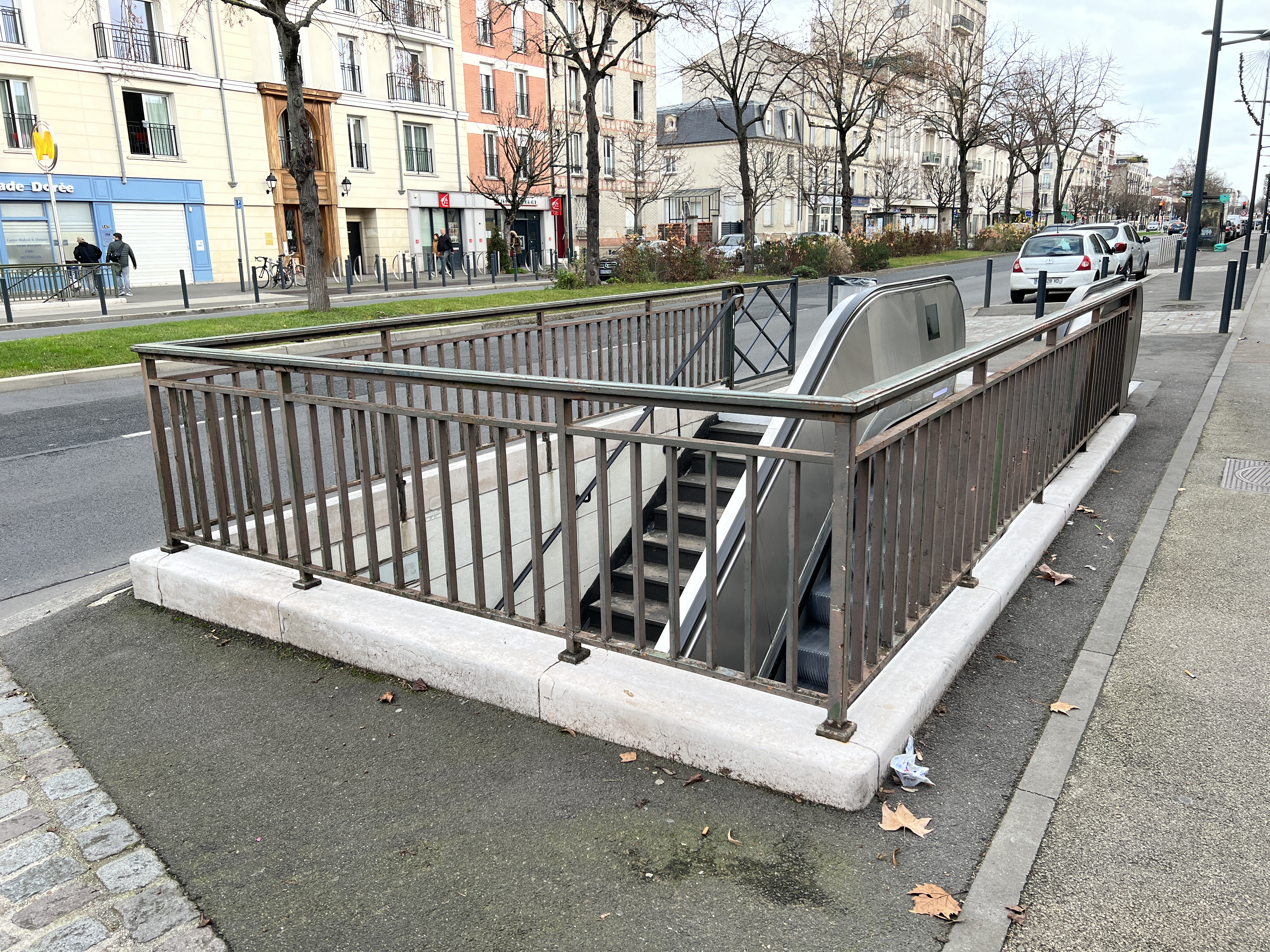
Escalator at access 2
