= Alfortville =

- Commune
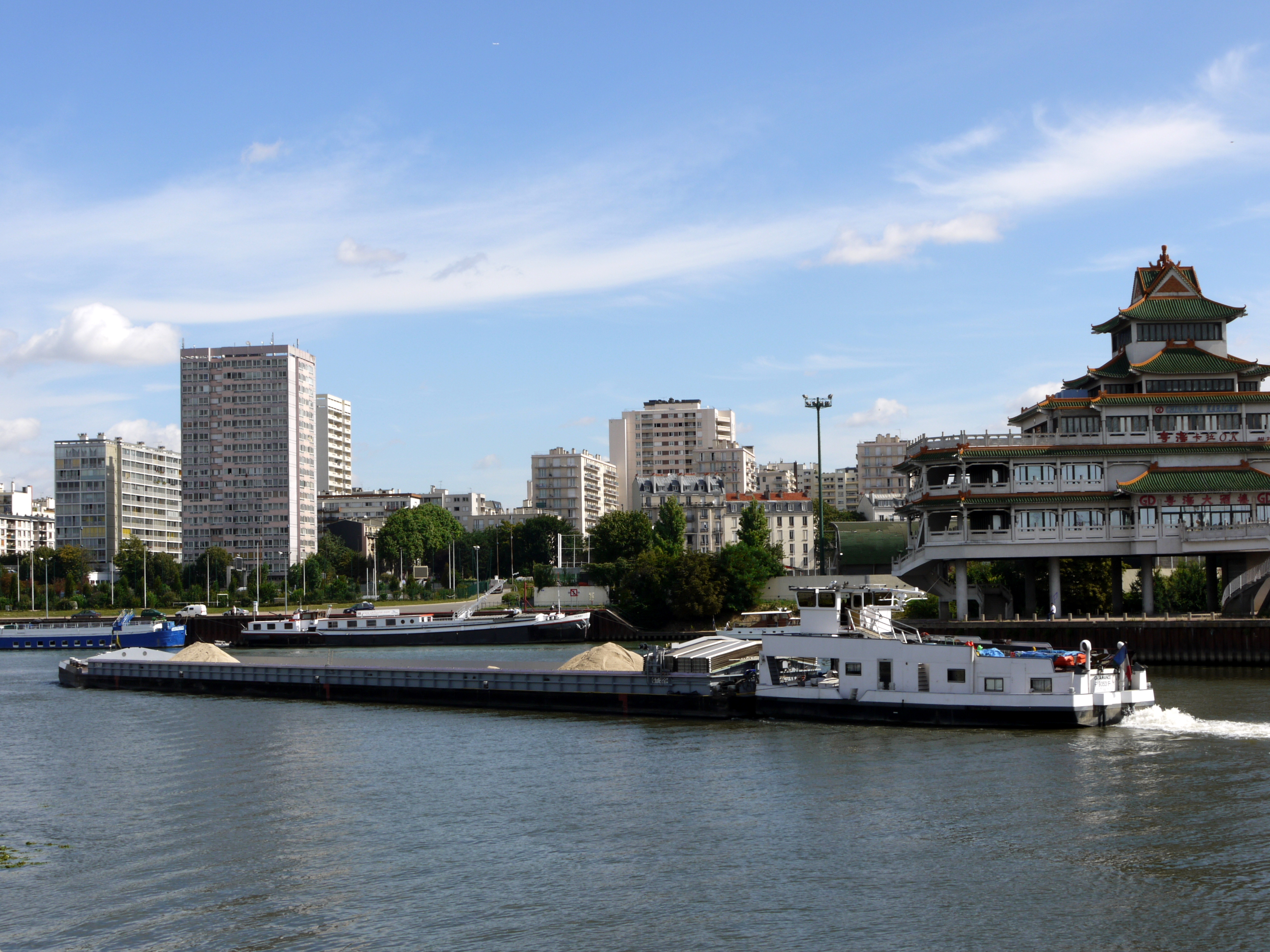
- Alfortville and Chinagora, with a barge and tugboat on the River Seine

- Coat of arms

- Location (in red) within Paris inner suburbs
- Location of Alfortville
- Location within France Location within Île-de-France (region)
- Coordinates: 48°48′18″N 2°25′26″E
- Country: France
- Region: Île-de-France
- Department: Val-de-Marne
- Arrondissement: Créteil
- Canton: Alfortville
- Intercommunality: Grand Paris

Government
  - Mayor (2026–32): Luc Carvounas
- Area^{1}: 3.67 km^{2} (1.42 sq mi)
- Elevation: 32 m (105 ft)
- Highest elevation: 37 m (121 ft)
- Lowest elevation: 27 m (89 ft)
- Population (2023): 45,531
  - Density: 12,400/km^{2} (32,100/sq mi)
- Time zone: UTC+01:00 (CET)
  - Summer (DST): UTC+02:00 (CEST)
- INSEE/Postal code: 94002 /94140
- ^{1} French Land Register data, which excludes lakes, ponds, glaciers > 1 km^{2} (0.386 sq mi or 247 acres) and river estuaries.

Alfortville (French pronunciation: [alfɔʁvil]) is a commune in the Val-de-Marne department in the southeastern suburbs of Paris, France. It is located 7.6 km (4.7 mi) from the center of Paris. It is one of the 13 communes in the intercommunality of Métropole du Grand Paris. It is also further divided into 15 neighborhoods.

== History ==
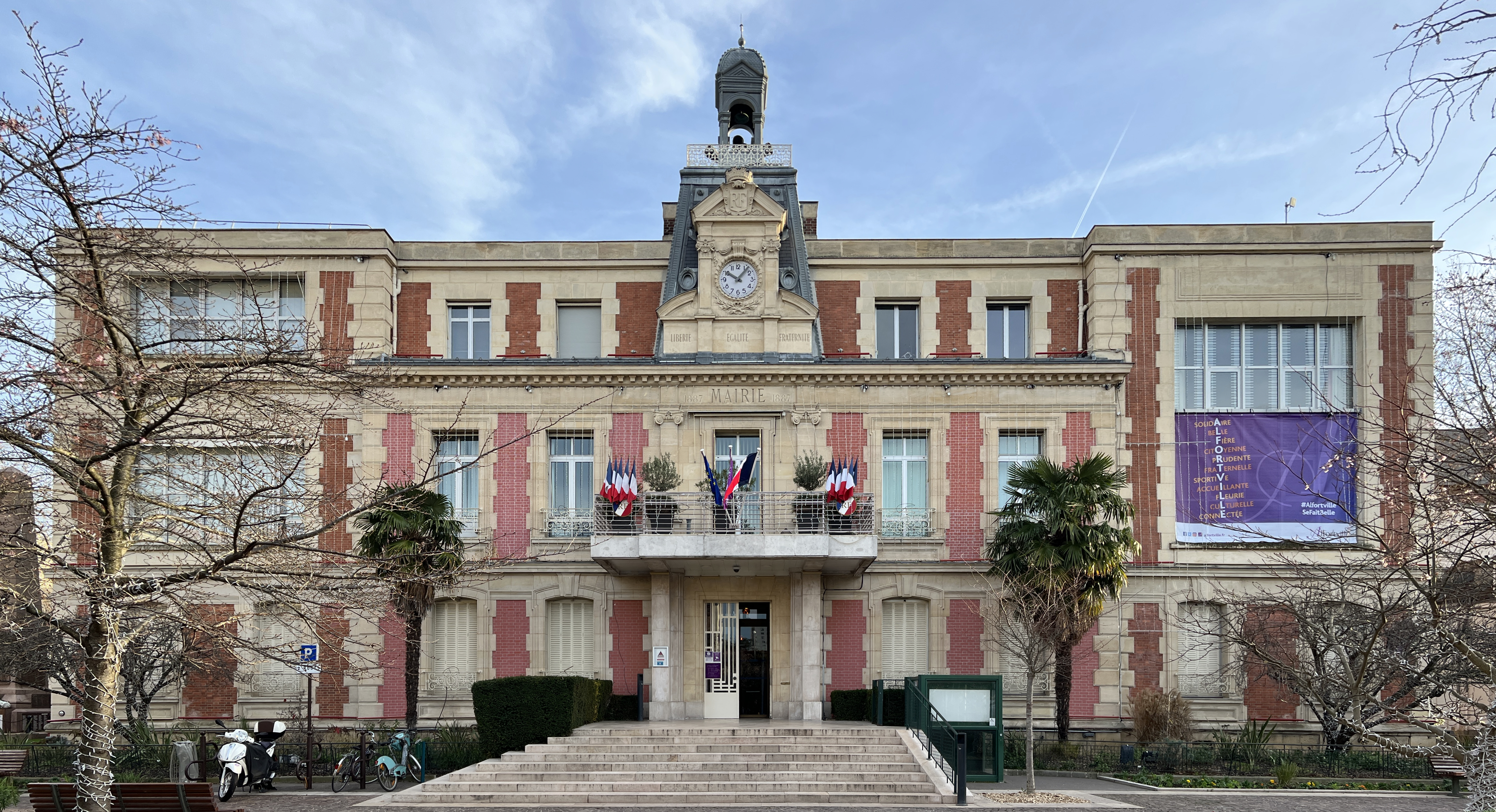
The Hôtel de Ville

In 1885, 40% of the territory of Maisons-Alfort was split off and became the commune of Alfortville.

The Hôtel de Ville was completed in 1887.

== Transport ==
Alfortville is served by two stations on Paris RER D: Maisons-Alfort–Alfortville and Le Vert de Maisons.

Alfortville is located at only 500 meters from the metro station École Vétérinaire de Maisons-Alfort on Paris Métro Line 8.

== Population ==
Historical population

Year	Pop.	±% p.a.
1886	6,603	—
1891	7,984	+3.87%
1896	11,634	+7.82%
1901	15,980	+6.55%
1906	17,455	+1.78%
1911	18,267	+0.91%
1921	22,779	+2.23%
1926	24,896	+1.79%
1931	29,473	+3.43%
1936	30,078	+0.41%
1946	27,940	−0.73%

Year	Pop.	±% p.a.
1954	30,195	+0.97%
1962	32,332	+0.86%
1968	35,023	+1.34%
1975	38,057	+1.19%
1982	36,231	−0.70%
1990	36,119	−0.04%
1999	36,232	+0.03%
2007	44,116	+2.49%
2012	44,397	+0.13%
2017	43,881	−0.23%
2023	45,531	+0.62%

Source: EHESS and INSEE (1968-2023)

== Neighborhoods ==
Name	Quartier	INSEE/Postal code	Source
Blanqui Seine Ponton	1	940020105	
Chinagora Berthelot	1	940020101	
Diderot Louis Blanc	1	940020103	
Gare	1	940020109	
14 Juillet Zola	1	940020108	
Mairie	1	940020107	
Marché Guesde	1	940020104	
Micolon 14 Juillet	1	940020106	
Tony Garnier Soladier	1	940020102	
Carnot Petit Pont Alouettes	2	940020203	
Grand Ensemble	2	940020202	
Grenoble Toulon	2	940020206	
Jardin Val de Seine	2	940020204	
Vert de Maison	2	940020205	
Zola Carnot	2	940020201	

== Armenian community ==
The Armenian community of Alfortville is very significant. The Armenian Apostolic Church, located south of the city, is an important place for the Armenian community. There are streets named after Komitas Vartabed, Missak Manouchian, and the city of Yerevan. A roundabout has recently been named Place d'Achtarak after the Armenian city Ashtarak.

After military clashes in the Armenian-populated breakaway Nagorno-Karabakh region between Armenian and Azerbaijani troops resumed in 2020, the city council of Alfortville unanimously voted to support the recognition of its independence under its Armenian name of Artsakh Republic, making it the first French city to do so.

== Education ==
Public schools in the commune include:

- 9 preschools/nurseries (maternelles) and an annex
- 6 elementary schools
- Junior high schools: Collège Henri Barbusse, Collège Léon Blum, Collège Paul Langevin
- Lycée Polyvalent Maximilien Perret

Private schools include:

- Ecole privée Saint-Mesrop (preschool, elementary)
- Ecole primaire-College Kevork A Arabian

== Notable people ==
- Marten Yorgantz (born 1946), Armenian singer, opened a restaurant here
- Bendy Casimir (born 1980), mixed martial arts fighter
- Jean-Eudes Maurice (born 1986), Haitian footballer
- Jonathan Bamba (born 1996), footballer
- Ihsan Sacko (born 1997), footballer

== Twin towns – sister cities ==
Alfortville is twinned with:

- San Benedetto del Tronto, Italy (1989)
- Cantanhede, Portugal (2000)
- Oshakan, Armenia (2001)
- El Biar, Algeria (2011)

== See also ==
- Communes of the Val-de-Marne department
