= Marten Yorgantz =

French-Armenian singer and composer

Marten Yorgantz (born 24 June 1946 in Istanbul) is a popular French-Armenian singer and composer. He is recognized as a popular Armenian singer in Europe.

He recorded 24 albums in different languages, mostly in Armenian, Italian and French. Among his well-known hits are "Chkuytik", "Hayi Achker", "Hayeren Ergenk", "Ayp, Pen, Kim", "Ay Maral Maral", "Partir pour ne plus revenir" and others. In 1976, he opened his first restaurant called Cappadocia in the Armenian populated Alfortville district outside of Paris. In 1980 he opened a second restaurant in the rue Saint-Georges in the heart of Paris, where he regularly sings, but which has now been closed.

After the Spitak earthquake he gave about 100 concerts for the Armenian children.

== Awards ==
- Golden micro, France, 1967
- Gold medal of Karot festival, Moscow, 2008

== Discography ==
Studio Albums:

- 1976 Sings... Armenian Immortal
- 1978 Volume 2
- 1979 Volume 3
- 1980 Yorgantz
- 1982 Yorgantz
- 1984 Yorgantz
- 1985 Yorgantz
- 1986 International
- 1987 Hye Es Toun, Hayeren Khoseh
- 1989 Yorgantz For Children
- 1990 Ser Yev Mioutioun
- 1992 International
- 1993 Yorgantz Sings For Children
- 1997 L'Armenian
- 2000 Yorgantz 2000
- 2006 Sepastia
