= Hôtel de Ville, Maisons-Alfort =

Town hall in Maisons-Alfort, France

Hôtel de Ville
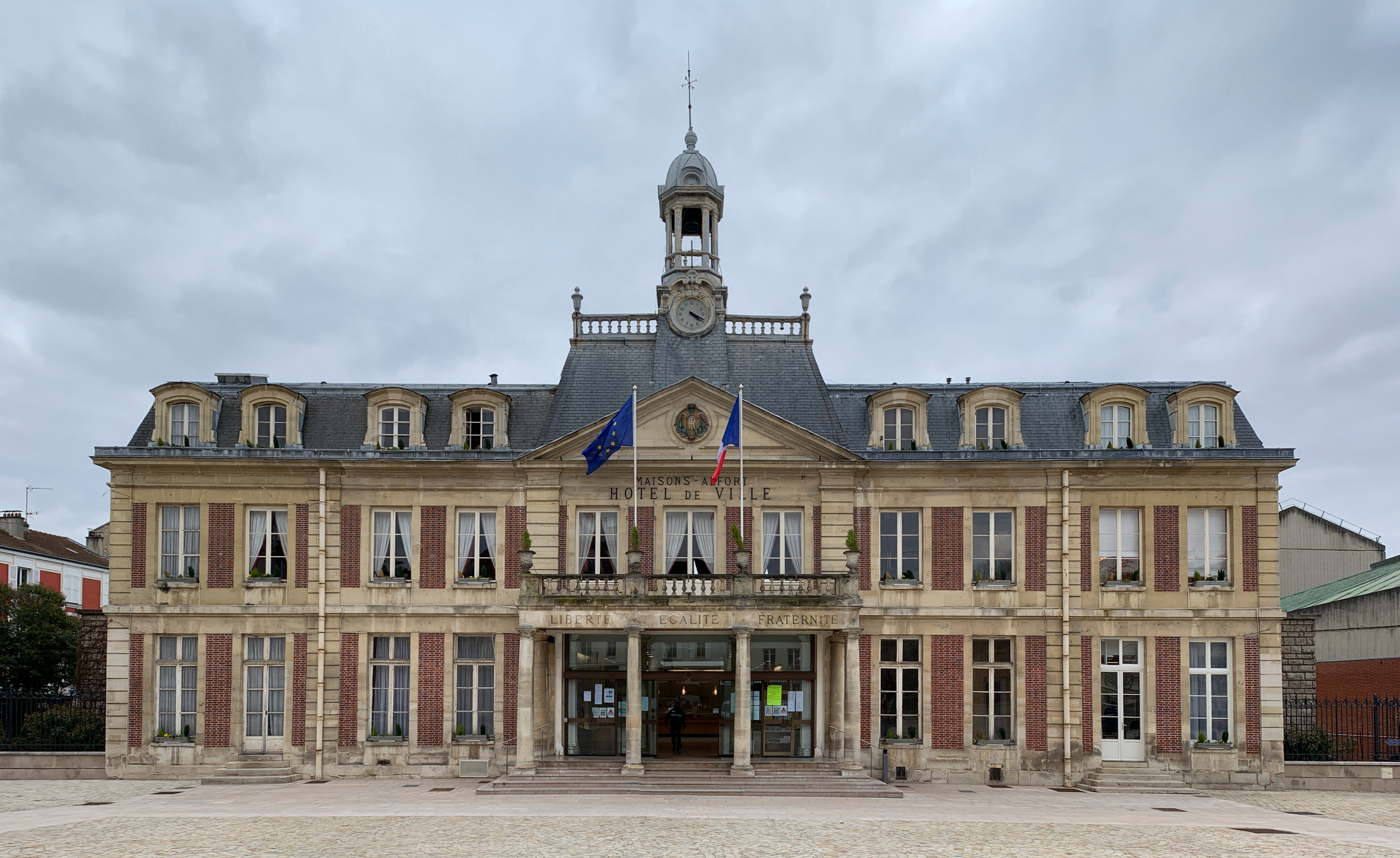
- The main frontage of the Hôtel de Ville in March 2021
- Interactive map of the Hôtel de Ville area

General information
- Type: City hall
- Architectural style: Neoclassical style
- Location: Maisons-Alfort, France
- Coordinates: 48.8011°N 2.4307°E
- Completed: 1896

Design and construction
- Architect: Georges Guyon

The Hôtel de Ville (French pronunciation: [otɛl də vil], City Hall) is a municipal building in Maisons-Alfort, Val-de-Marne, in the southeastern suburbs of Paris, standing on Avenue Général de Gaulle. It has been included on the Inventaire général des monuments by the French Ministry of Culture since 1990.

== History ==
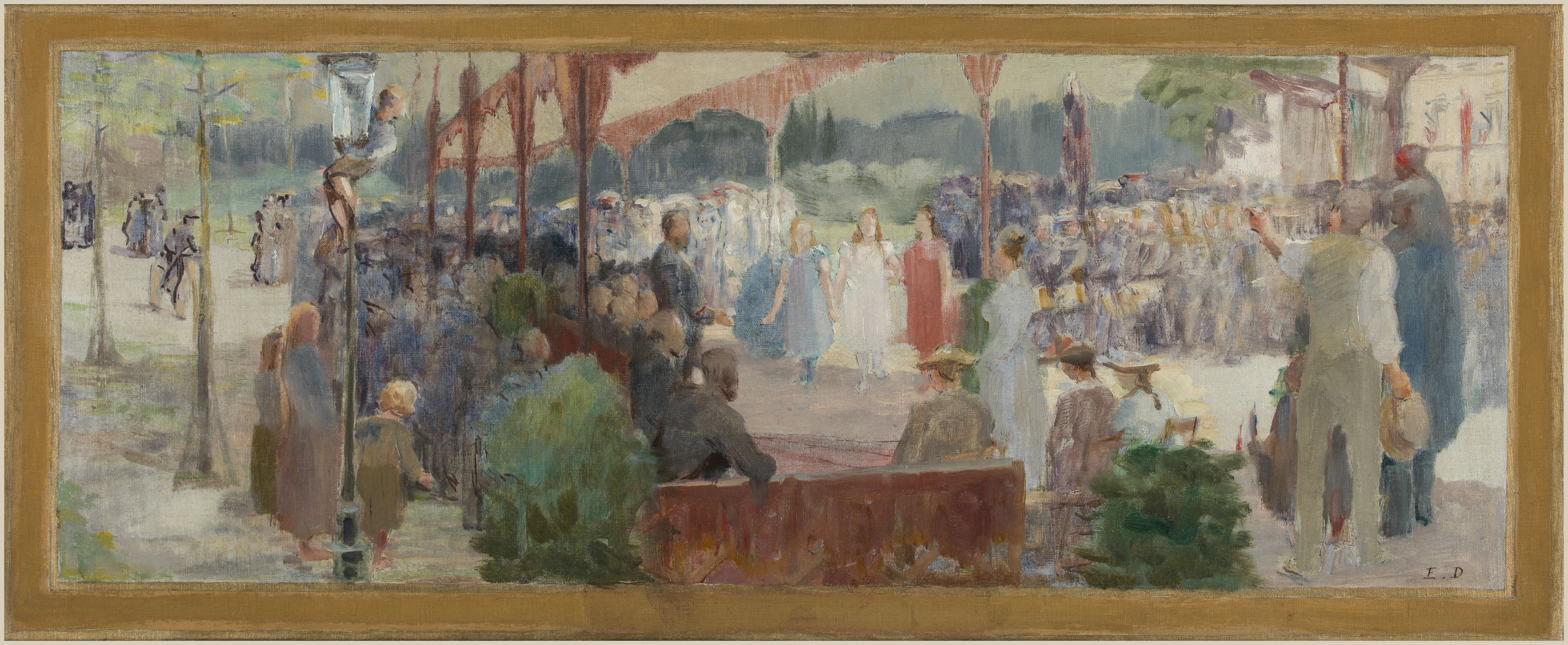
Mural by Edmond Debon in the Salle des Fêtes (ballroom)

Following the French Revolution, the town council initially met in the clergy house of the Church of Saint-Rémi. From 1813, meetings were held at the house of new mayor, Marquis Claude Laurent Marie Dodun de Kéroman. In 1834, the council decided to commission a dedicated town hall: the site it selected was on Place de l'Église. The building, which was designed by Sieur Molinos, also included a school and was completed in around 1837. By 1860, the town hall on Place de l'Église was considered inadequate and the council decided to acquire a disused farm building on the corner of Grande-Rue and Rue de Charentonneau. After minor conversion works had been completed, the new town hall was officially opened by the mayor, Adolphe Véron, on 15 August 1864.

In the early 1890s, the town council decided to acquire a more substantial property for use as a town hall. The site it selected, on what is now Avenue Général de Gaulle, was the property of the Lesieur family and dated from the 18th century. A major reconstruction of the building was carried out to a design by Georges Guyon. After the works had been completed, the town hall was officially re-opened in the presence of the new mayor, Amédée Chenal, the Prefect of the Department of the Seine, Justin de Selves, and the minister of the interior, Louis Barthou, on 12 July 1896. The new design involved a symmetrical main frontage of 11 bays facing onto Avenue Général de Gaulle. The central section of three bays featured a portico formed by four Doric order columns supporting an entablature and a stone balcony. There were three French doors on the first floor, flanked by banded pilasters supporting a pediment with a coat of arms in the tympanum. There was a steep roof above the central section surmounted by a clock and an octagonal lantern. The other bays were fenestrated by casement windows on both floors. Internally, the principal rooms were the Salle du Conseil (council chamber), and the Salle des Fêtes (ballroom), which contained a mural by Edmond Debon entitled "Hommage au Mérite" (Tribute to Merit).

During the Paris insurrection, part of the Second World War, a group of soldiers from the French Forces of the Interior, led by Captain Roland Deplanque seized the town hall on the night of 19 August 1944. Deplanque was captured, taken into the forest and shot by German troops on 22 August 2014. This was just three days before the official liberation of the town by the French 2nd Armoured Division, commanded by General Philippe Leclerc, on 25 August 1944.

In the early 1960s, the complex was extended to the rear with a large modern block, which was officially opened in the presence of the mayor, Arthur Hévette, the Prefect of the Department of the Seine, Raymond Haas-Picard, and the minister of the interior, Roger Frey, on 18 January 1964.

== Sources ==
- Chenal, Amédée (1898). "Histoire de Maisons-Alfort et d'Alfortville – depuis les temps les plus reculés jusqu'à nos jours". Asselin et Houzeau.
