= Fort de Charenton =

- Part of Thiers fortifications of Paris
- Maisons-Alfort, France
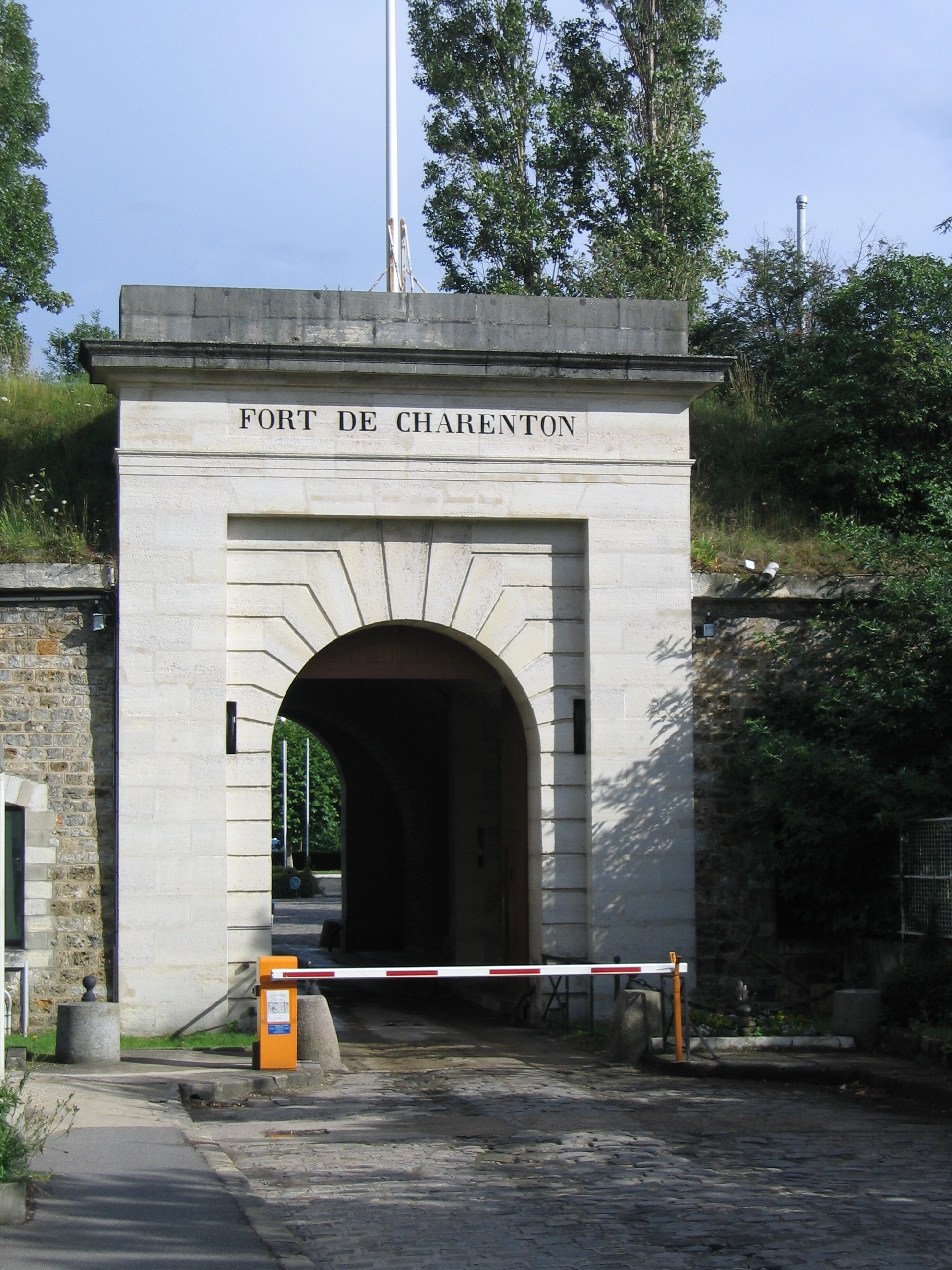
- Entry, Fort de Charenton

Site information
- Type: Fort
- Owner: Gendarmerie Nationale Française
- Controlled by: France
- Open to the public: no
- Condition: Occupied

Location
- Coordinates: 48.808927°N 2.428828°E

Site history
- Built: 1842
- Battles/wars: Siege of Paris

Garrison information
- Occupants: Gendarmerie nationale

Fort de Charenton is a fortification built in 1842 in the community of Maisons-Alfort, and part of the Paris defences planned by Adolphe Thiers.

After the fall of Napoleon I in 1814, and again after Napoleon's defeat at Waterloo in 1815, Paris was occupied by foreign forces. To counter new invasion and occupation, defensive works were planned. In 1841 a new fortified enclosure of Paris was proposed, becoming known as the Thiers wall after its chief proponent, prime minister Adolphe Thiers. The plan involved the construction of a new fortified wall around an expanded Paris, the Thiers wall proper, and the building of sixteen new forts a few kilometers farther out. The Fort de Charenton was planned as part of this system. Presently occupied by the National Gendarmerie, the fort saw passing regiments as well as foreign occupation forces at the time of the Franco-Prussian War of 1870 and the Second World War.

== History of the Thiers Wall ==
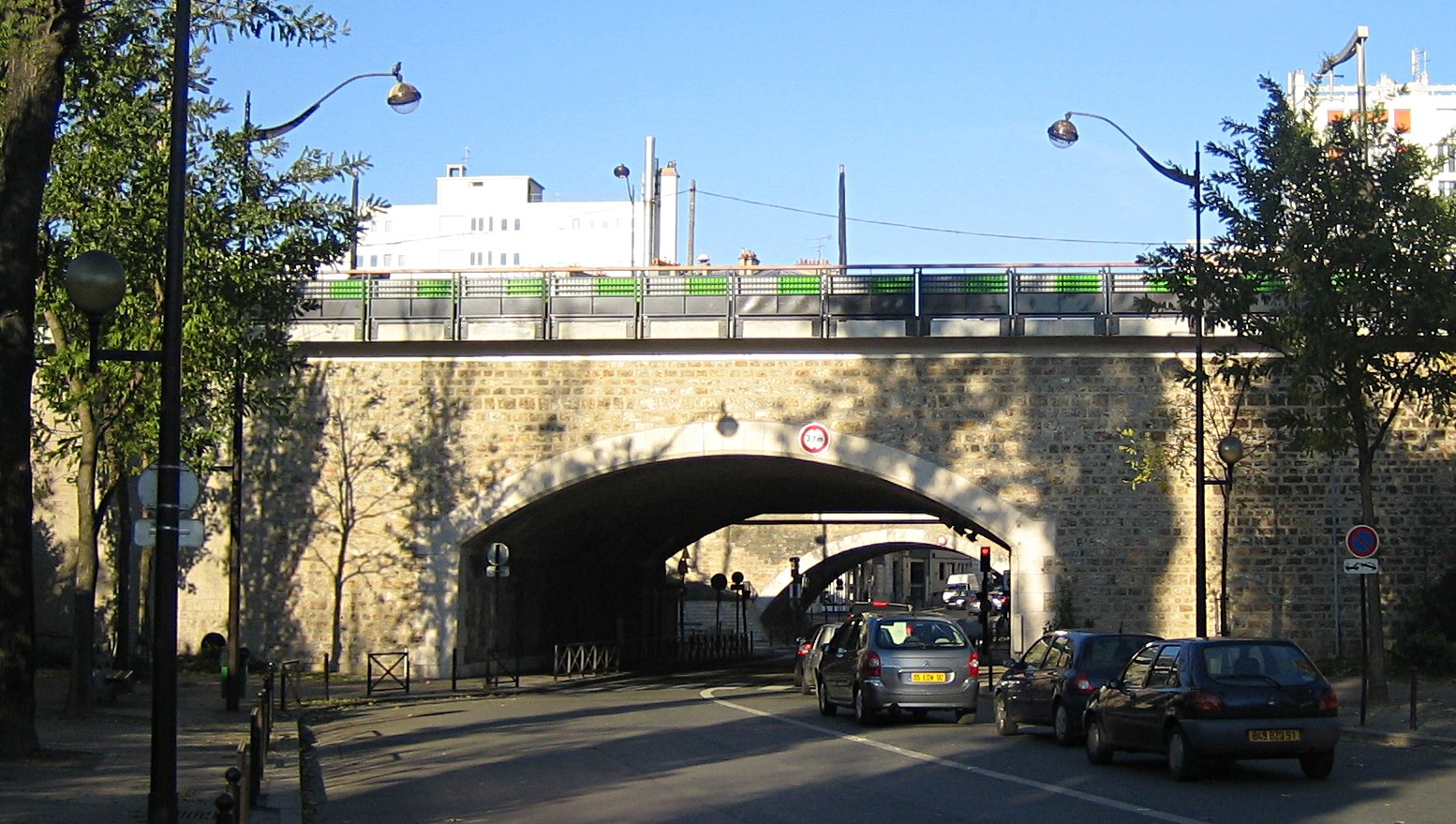
The Poterne des Peupliers, one of the few vestiges still visible of the Thiers Wall

Before the Napoleonic Wars, Paris had not been invaded by an enemy army since the Hundred Years' War. Louis-Philippe, proclaimed king of the French in 1830, was convinced that the key to the defense of France was to prevent Paris from falling too easily into the hands of foreign armies, as in 1814. He conceived a project to build an enclosure of fortifications around the capital that would make the city impregnable. The first project was presented to the Chambre des Députés at the beginning of 1833 by Marshal Soult, President of the Council and Minister of War. The proposal was sharply opposed by the Left, which suspected, or pretended to suspect, ulterior motives on behalf of the government with respect to internal policy. The Left claimed that the fortifications were actually intended not to defend France, but to threaten Parisians if they revolted against the royal powers.

With the walls surrounding Paris a system of 16 detached forts was added, placed a few kilometers away as a first line of defence. Among them was the Fort de Charenton.

== Fort de Charenton ==
The Fort de Charenton is a defensive work located in the town of Maisons-Alfort, by whose name it was originally known. It later took the name of the town it was to defend, Charenton-le-Pont. The fort cost 5 million francs at the time, equivalent to 9 million current euros. Construction lasted five years.

=== Choice of location ===
The fort was originally proposed for the plateau of Charenton-Saint-Maurice, where land was purchased, but the military administration changed its opinion and moved the project to its present site. In the middle of the 19th century, Maisons-Alfort was open country. The hill finally chosen, the Butte de Gramont, had clear lines of fire, apart from the National Veterinary School of Alfort, to the northwest. The fort is located at a strategic point that was contested in 1814, where forces under Frederick of Württemberg attacked the bridges of Charenton, defended by veterinary students and some regular troops, and the bridges of Saint-Maur-des-Fossés, obligatory passages on the Marne. The fort commands Route Nationale 6 to Geneva and Route Nationale 19 to Belfort along with the Pont de Charenton on the Marne and the Pont à l'Anglais on the Seine.

=== Construction ===
==== The fort ====
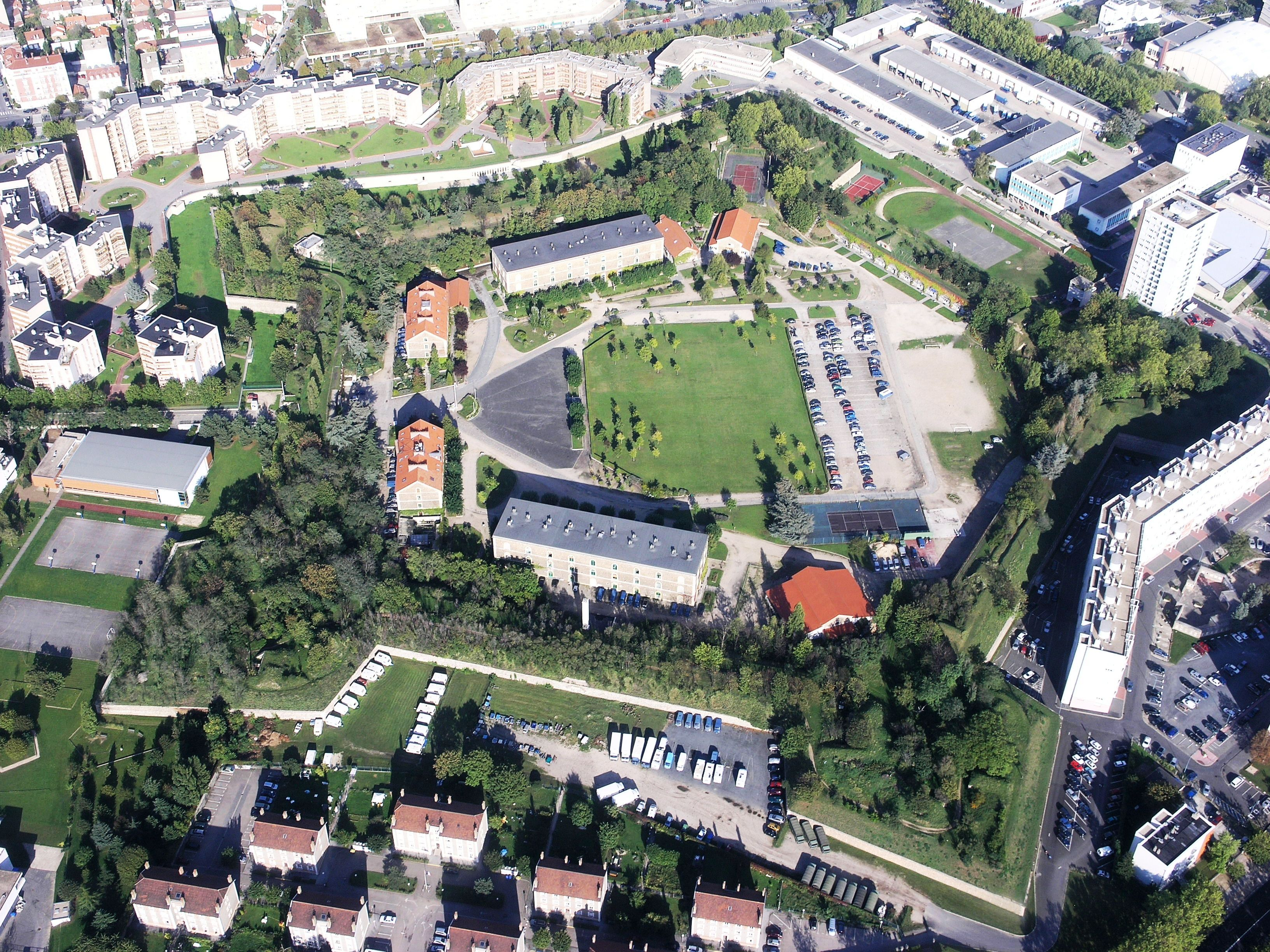
Aerial view of the Fort de Charenton, with buildings of the Republican Guard in the foreground, built in the 1930s

The fort was built according to the Vauban system. Construction required a site of about 26 hectares, with accompanying difficulties with expropriation from the existing owners. The fort itself occupies an area of approximately 10 hectares with a perimeter of about 1500 metres. The first stone was laid by Louis-Philippe on 19 April 1841 only two weeks after construction was authorized, and the walls were finished the following year.

==== The caserne ====
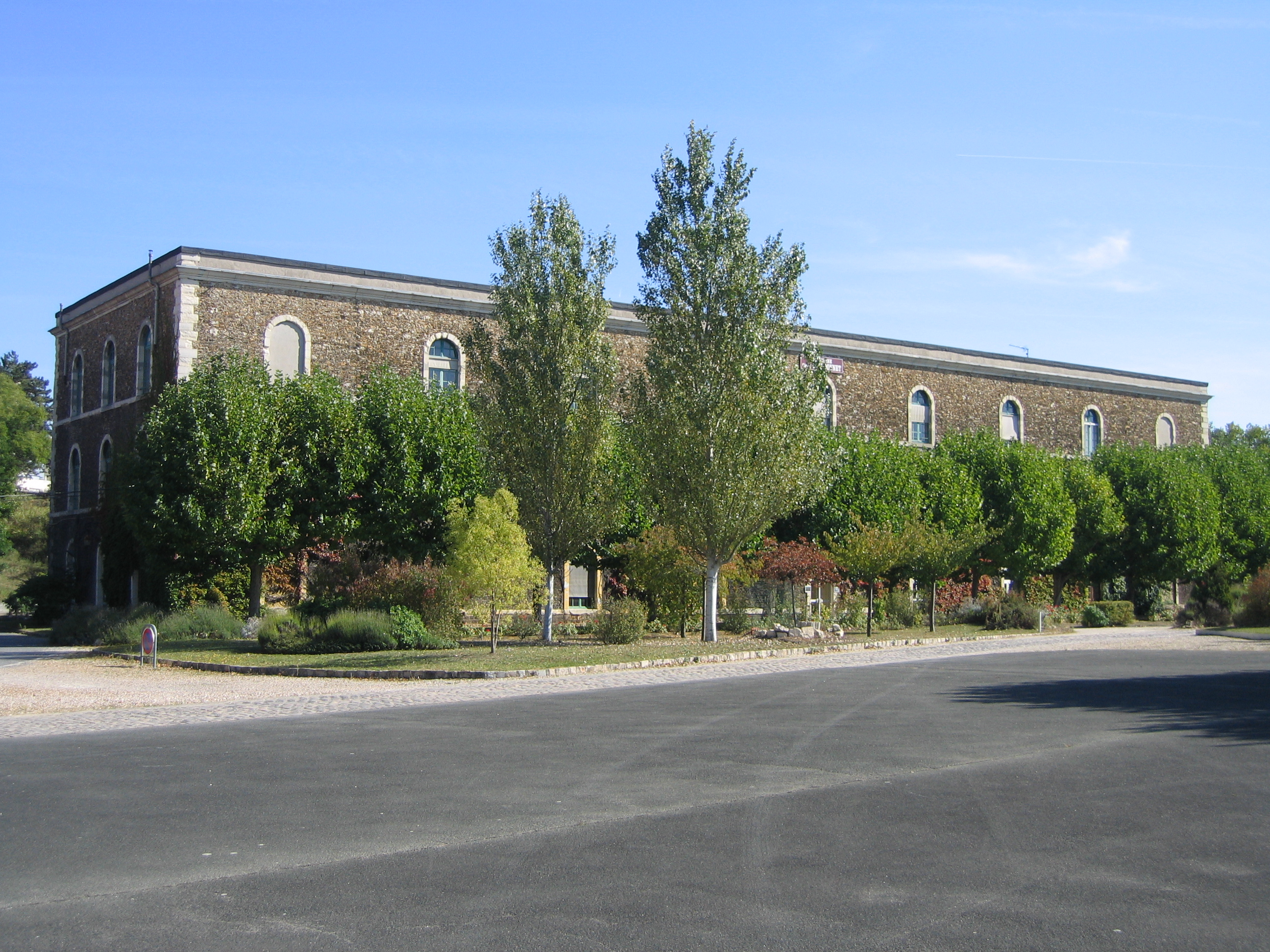
View of one of the fort's two casemates

Accommodating several hundred men, the fort's buildings were laid out in 1843 according to the following program:

"The barracks will be laid out to accommodate four companies of approximately 110 men with their warrant officers ... They will be two stories high above the ground floor and will be composed of a series of bays with a span of 6.5 metres, with two windows on each frontage They will be high of two stages above the ground floor, and will be composed d' a series of spans of 6,50 m width, informed by two windows on each façade, and are served two by two, three meters wide and leading directly to the principal façade. Moreover, two other staircases entered at the gable ends are located on each end bay, which are divided into small rooms. The troop quarters are located on the long sides with communicating openings between them ... they will have a length of 14.1 metres and a ceiling height of 3.45 metres, and will accommodate twenty-four beds."

"The pitched roof will be zinc-covered with gables at the ends to avoid costs for trusses, on top of the cross walls starting from the attic floor and supported by masonry pillars, on which will rest the roof purlins. Moreover, due to the span of the members, they would otherwise need to be especially heavy, so they have been augmented by bracing that permits a reduction in their dimension to those ordinarily found in commercially available timbers."

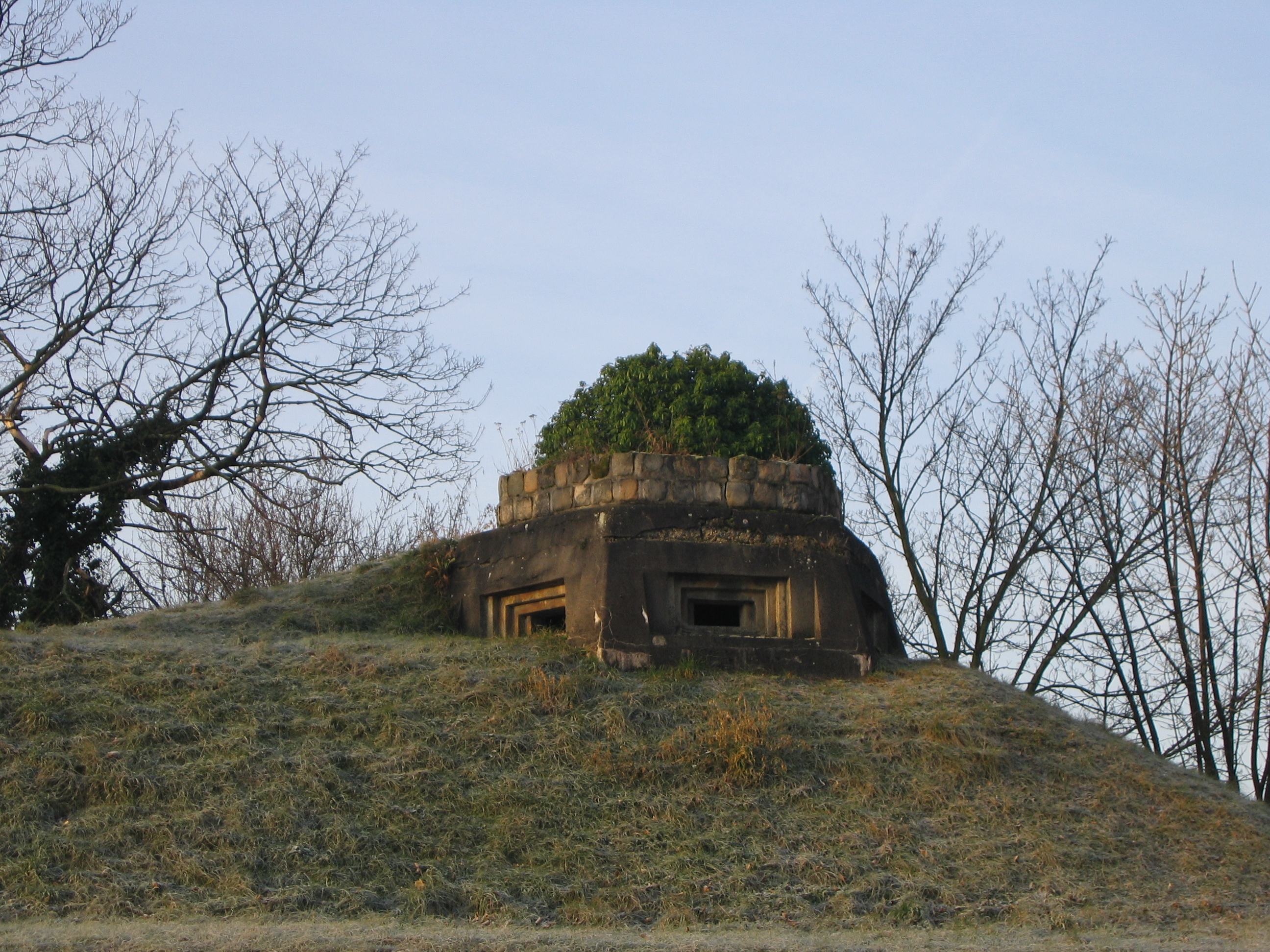
Casemate built by the Germans during the Second World War on the Fort de Charenton

"Chimney flues will be installed in the cross walls at each floor that will be offset to meet at a single chimney on the ridge of the building."

"The stairs will be of wood, with one or two additional steps between the ground and first floors compared with the flight between the first and second floors, with sufficient height at the landings to allow access to small rooms behind the stairs."

In 1930 barracks were built outside the fort to accommodate the 3rd cavalry group of the 1st Legion of the Mobile Republican Guard. Ten of these buildings remain along Boulevard Charles de Gaulle.

During the German occupation from 1940, small pillboxes with machine guns were built in the point of each bastion.

== History ==
Completed in 1845, the fort was used as a prison following the Revolution of 1848. A few years after the rise of Napoleon III the fort's armament was updated with rifled guns. The long-range guns had a firing range of 3000 metres.

During the Franco-German War the fort took part in the defence of Paris against the Prussians. The fort fired at targets in Moulins-Saquet, the Gare-aux-bœufs, Mont-Mesly, and destroyed part of Choisy-le-Roi, which had been occupied by the Prussians.No fire was returned in the direction of the fort or town. After the Prussian victory, the fort was handed over to occupation troops in February 1871, and was evacuated in September the same year.

In 1910 the garrison was provided by the 1st group of the 59th artillery regiment. By the First World War the garrison was the 3rd regiment of colonial artillery. In 1914 the fort was occupied by the 32nd divisional regiment, which stayed until the Second World War, when it was sent to the front, and where it was practically destroyed in combat.

=== After the Second World War ===
Little information is available concerning the German occupation. The fort was used during this time as an ammunition dump and radio transmitting station. As the Allies advanced on Paris, the fort was abandoned by the Germans on 25 August 1944. Before leaving the Germans set up a timed-detonation device in the hundreds of tons of explosives using an acid-fuse device. The device was defused by bomb disposal expert Roger François and the destruction of the fort and the potential destruction of the town was averted. A plaque commemorates the deed.

After 1944 the fort was used by the Gendarmerie and was employed as a center for political prisoners and for juvenile delinquents. The fort was formally transferred to the Gendarmerie in 1950. It was used as a training and assembly center for units destined to the French war in Indo-China, with more than 6000 gendarmes passing through. After the war, other Gendarmerie units were installed at the fort, with the training command occupying the fort from 1959 to 2000. The Groupe d'Intervention de la Gendarmerie Nationale (GIGN) was established in 1974 and housed at the Fort de Charenton until 1983, when it moved to Satory. Presently the fort is occupied by various services of the directorate of the Ministry of the Interior and by the regional direction of the Gendarmerie for Ile-de-France.

== Sources ==
- This page is a translation of its French equivalent.

== See also ==
- Fortifications of Paris in the 19th and 20th centuries

== Bibliography ==
- (in French) Handout « Le Fort de Charenton, 150 ans d'histoire » - 1995
- (in French) Amédée Chenal - « Histoire de Maisons-Alfort et d’Alfortville » - 1898
- (in French) Maisons-Alfort, Mille ans d'histoire AMAH, 2 volumes1984-1986:
  - Tome I - Des origines au XIXe siècle
  - Tome II - le XXe siècle
