= Château de Réghat =

Château in Maisons-Alfort, France

Coordinates: 48.8004°N 2.4356°E

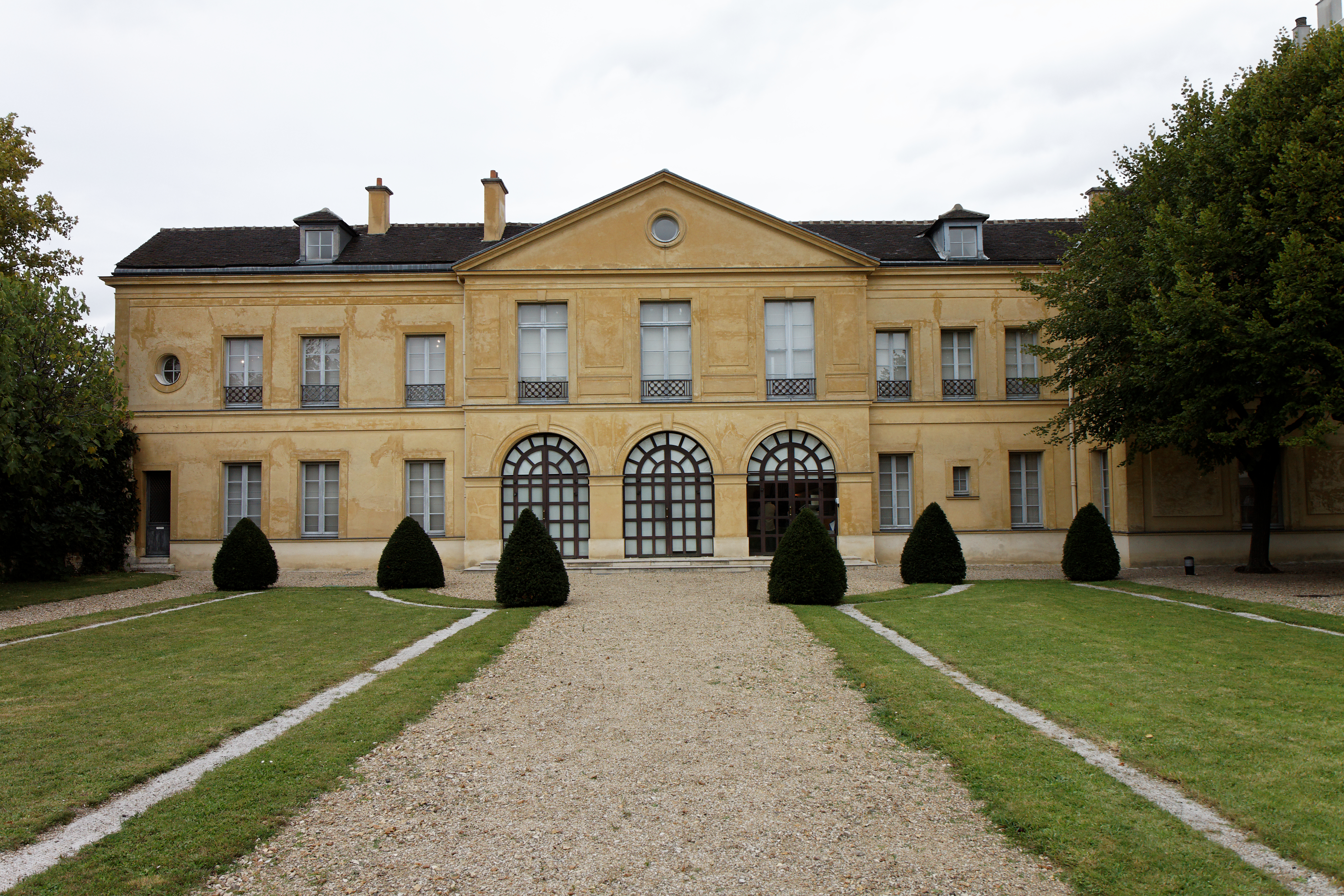
- The Château de Réghat in 2011
- Interactive map of the Château de Réghat area

The Château de Réghat (French pronunciation: [ʃato d(ə) ʁeɡa]) is a château in the Parisian suburb of Maisons-Alfort, Val-de-Marne, France.

== History ==
The château was built in the second half of the 18th century and in the 19th century.

== Architectural significance ==
It has been listed as a monument historique since 1979.
