= Nicole Tourneur =

French writer

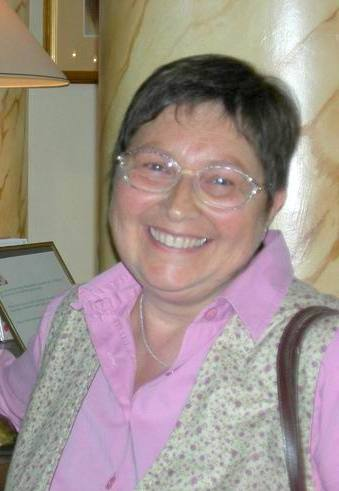
- Nicole Tourneur (2006)
- Born: 9 August 1950; Maisons-Alfort, France
- Died: 14 May 2011 (aged 60); Le Mesnil-Saint-Denis, France
- Occupation: Novelist
- Writing career
- Notable work: Terre brûlante

Nicole Tourneur (9 August 1950 – 14 May 2011) was a French novelist.

== Biography ==
Born in Maisons-Alfort, Tourneur trained as an accountant. She lived in Mexico.

== Works ==
=== For adults ===
- Le dernier soleil
- Laurie ou le souffle du papillon, novel (Gunten, Dole), 2001
- Les fenêtres, novella (Gunten, Dole), 2002
- Passé compliqué, novel (Gunten, Dole), 2004
- Les Dieux sont servis, novel (Gunten, Dole), 2006
- Terre brûlante, novel (Gunten, Dole), 2009
- Où va le temps ... novella (Janus, Paris), 2010
- Le serpentin des mots novel (Editions du bout de la rue), 2011

=== For children ===
- Clara et les nuages (Éditions du Bout de la Rue), 2007
- Girouette la chouette (Éditions du Bout de la Rue), 2007
- Les péripéties d’Antoine - le vaccin (Éditions du Bout de la Rue), 2007
- Le lama vert qui n'avait pas d'oreilles (Éditions du Bout de la Rue), 2009
- Oscar le suricate qui portait malheur (Éditions du Bout de la Rue), 2011
