= Lycée Maximilien Perret =

Senior high school in France

Lycée Maximilien Perret is a comprehensive senior high school/sixth-form college in Alfortville, Val-de-Marne, France, in the Paris metropolitan area. It has general and vocational education.

It opened in 1997.
