= École Vétérinaire de Maisons-Alfort station =

Metro station in Maisons-Alfort, France

École Vétérinaire de Maisons-Alfort
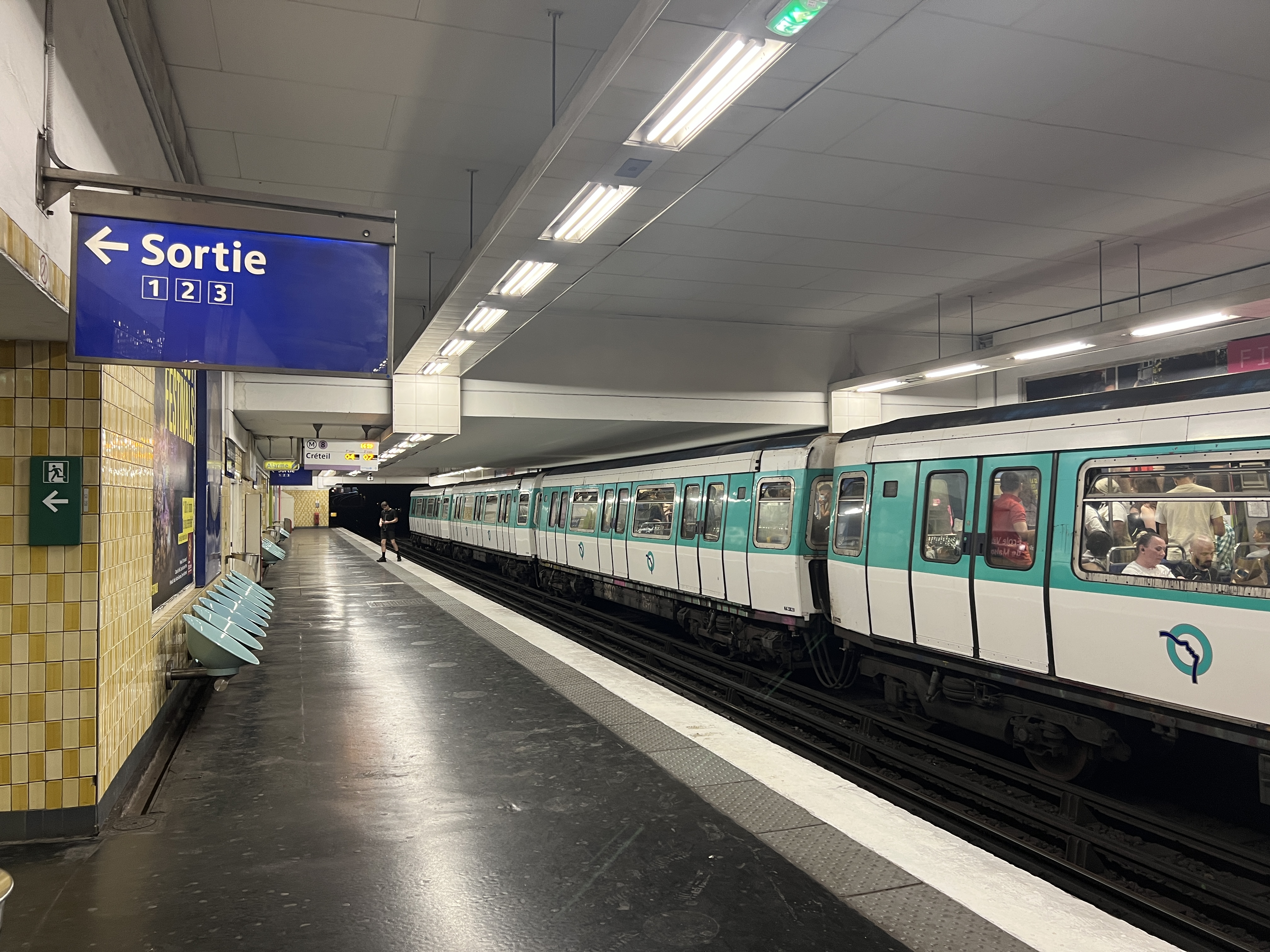
- MF 77 at École Vétérinaire de Maisons-Alfort

General information
- Location: Maisons-Alfort; Île-de-France; France
- Coordinates: 48°48′55″N 2°25′19″E
- System: Paris Métro station
- Owner: RATP
- Operator: RATP
- Line: Paris Metro Paris Metro Line 8
- Platforms: 2 (side platforms)
- Tracks: 2

Construction
- Accessible: no

Other information
- Station code: 2514
- Fare zone: 3

History
- Opened: 19 September 1970
- Former names: Maisons-Alfort–École Vétérinaire (19 September 1970 - 1996)

Passengers
- 2,269,487 (2021)

Services
Preceding station	Paris Metro	Following station
Charenton–Écoles towards Balard	Line 8	Maisons-Alfort–Stade towards Pointe du Lac
Location
- Location within Paris

École Vétérinaire de Maisons-Alfort (French pronunciation: [ekɔl veteʁinɛːʁ də mɛzɔ̃ alfɔʁ]; lit. 'Veterinary School of Maisons-Alfort') is a station on Line 8 of the Paris Métro in the suburban commune of Maisons-Alfort. It is named after the nearby École nationale vétérinaire d'Alfort, the national veterinary school founded in 1765.

== History ==
On 19 September 1970, the station opened as Maisons-Alfort–École Vétérinaire as part of the extension of the line from Charenton–Écoles to Maisons-Alfort–Stade. This began a new wave of network expansions after an 18-year break due to limited financial resources during the post-war period. It marks the first appearance of "box stations", characterised by its rectangular shape due its cut-and-cover method of construction. In 1996, the station was renamed École Vétérinaire de Maisons-Alfort, as it remains today.

As part of the "Un métro + beau" programme by the RATP, the station's corridors and platform lighting were renovated and modernised on 13 March 2009.

In 2019, the station was used by 3,193,857 passengers, making it the 156th busiest of the Métro network out of 302 stations.

In 2020, the station was used by 1,808,155 passengers amidst the COVID-19 pandemic, making it the 135th busiest of the Métro network out of 304 stations.

In 2021, the station was used by 1,808,155 passengers, making it the 154th busiest of the Métro network out of 304 stations.

== Passenger services ==
=== Access ===
The station has 3 accesses:

- Access 1: Carrefour de la Résistance
- Access 2: École Nationale Vétérinaire Musée Fragonard
- Access 3: avenue Général Leclerc (with an exit-only escalator from the eastbound platform)

=== Station layout ===
Street Level
B1	Mezzanine
Platform level	Side platform, doors will open on the right
Platform level	Westbound	← toward Balard (Charenton–Écoles)
Platform level	Eastbound	toward Pointe du Lac (Maisons-Alfort–Stade) →
Platform level	Side platform, doors will open on the right

=== Platforms ===
The station has a standard configuration with two tracks surrounded by two side platforms 105 meters. Built in the 1970s, it is a box station with vertical wall supporting a horizontal ceiling, due to its cut-and-cover construction; in addition, the height of the ceiling is lower in the middle under the distribution room, located overlooking the platforms and tracks. The decoration, typical of this decade, is similar to a variation of the Mouton-Duvernet style with walls and tunnel exits covered with hollow patterned tiles in various tones of ocher, placed vertically and aligned, as well as a ceiling and tops of walls treated in white. Lighting is provided by two suspended canopies which can also be found at the next station, Maisons-Alfort-Stade, as well as at the Porte de Bagnolet station on line 3 (in addition, the Gambetta station of the latter line was equipped with the same canopy model until its renovation in 2007). The advertising frames, slightly recessed, are metallic and the name of the station is written in Parisine font on enameled plaques. The seats are Akiko style in cyan, replacing the original red Motte seats.

The station shares this decorative style with only two other stopping points of the line located in the territory of the commune, Maisons-Alfort-Stade and Maisons-Alfort-Les Juilliottes. However, ocher-colored tiling also exists in the access corridors to the platform of Créteil-Université station on the same line, except that it only presents the lightest shade. In addition, the walls at platform level are decorated with panels representing stylized animals, illustrating idiomatic expressions relating to the species represented.

=== Other connections ===
The station is also served by lines 24, 103, 104, 107, 125, 181, and 325 of the RATP bus network, and at night, by lines N32 and N35 of the Noctilien bus network.

== Nearby ==
- Agence française de sécurité sanitaire des aliments (Afssa) headquarters
- Bpifrance headquarters
- Carrefour de la Résistance
- École nationale vétérinaire d'Alfort
- Musée Fragonard d'Alfort, a museum of anatomical oddities.

== Gallery ==
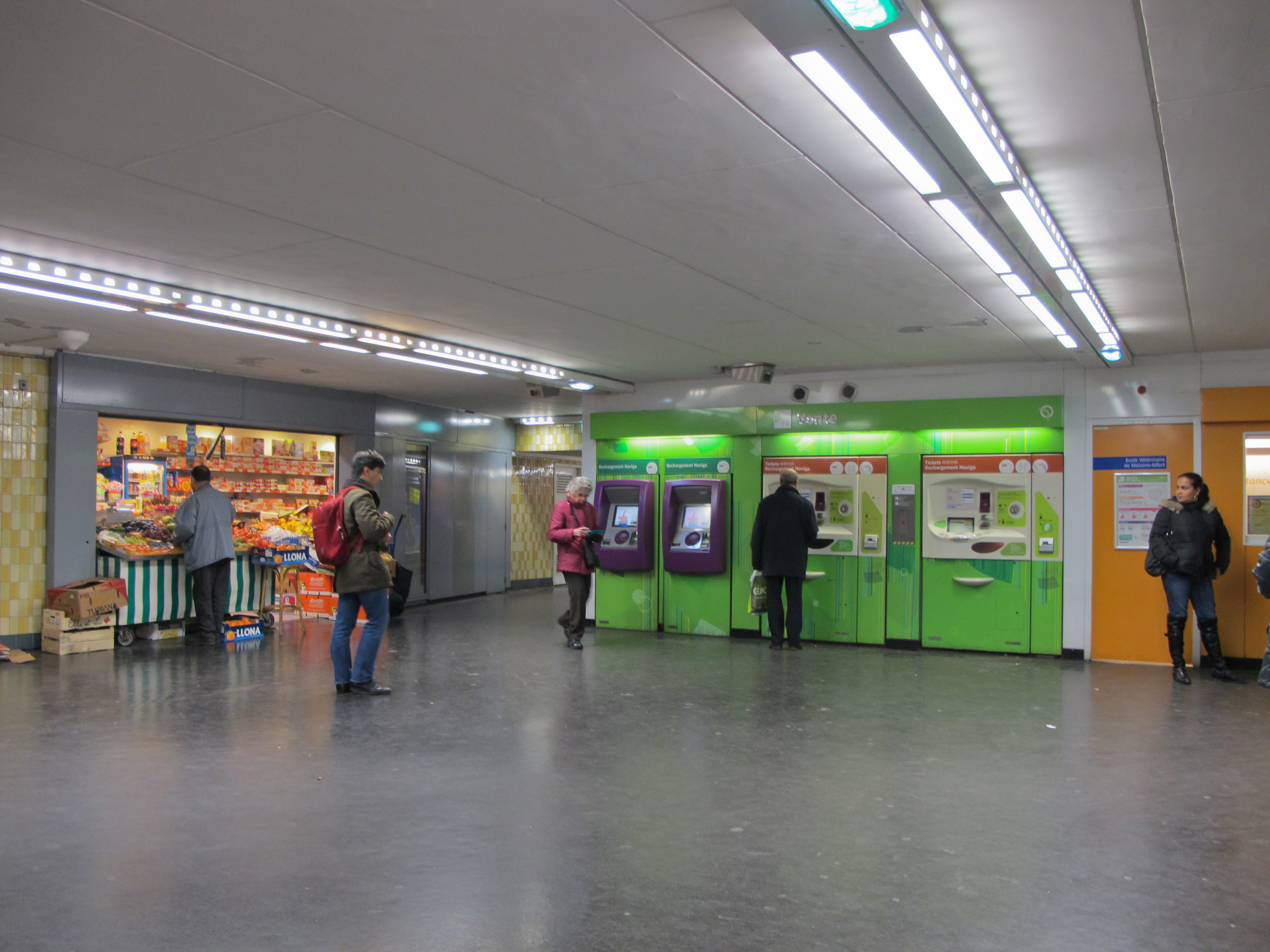
Mezzanine

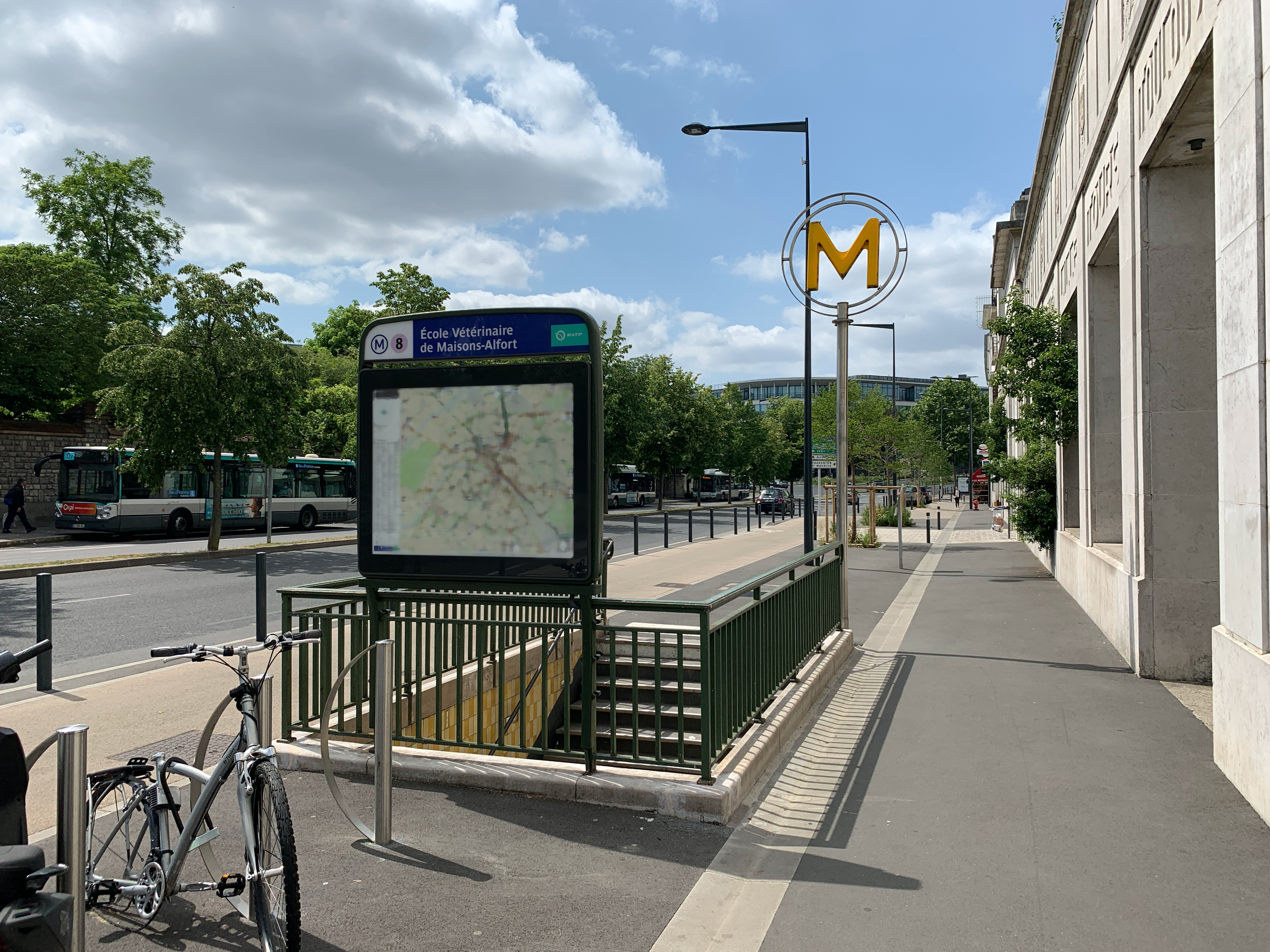
Access 1

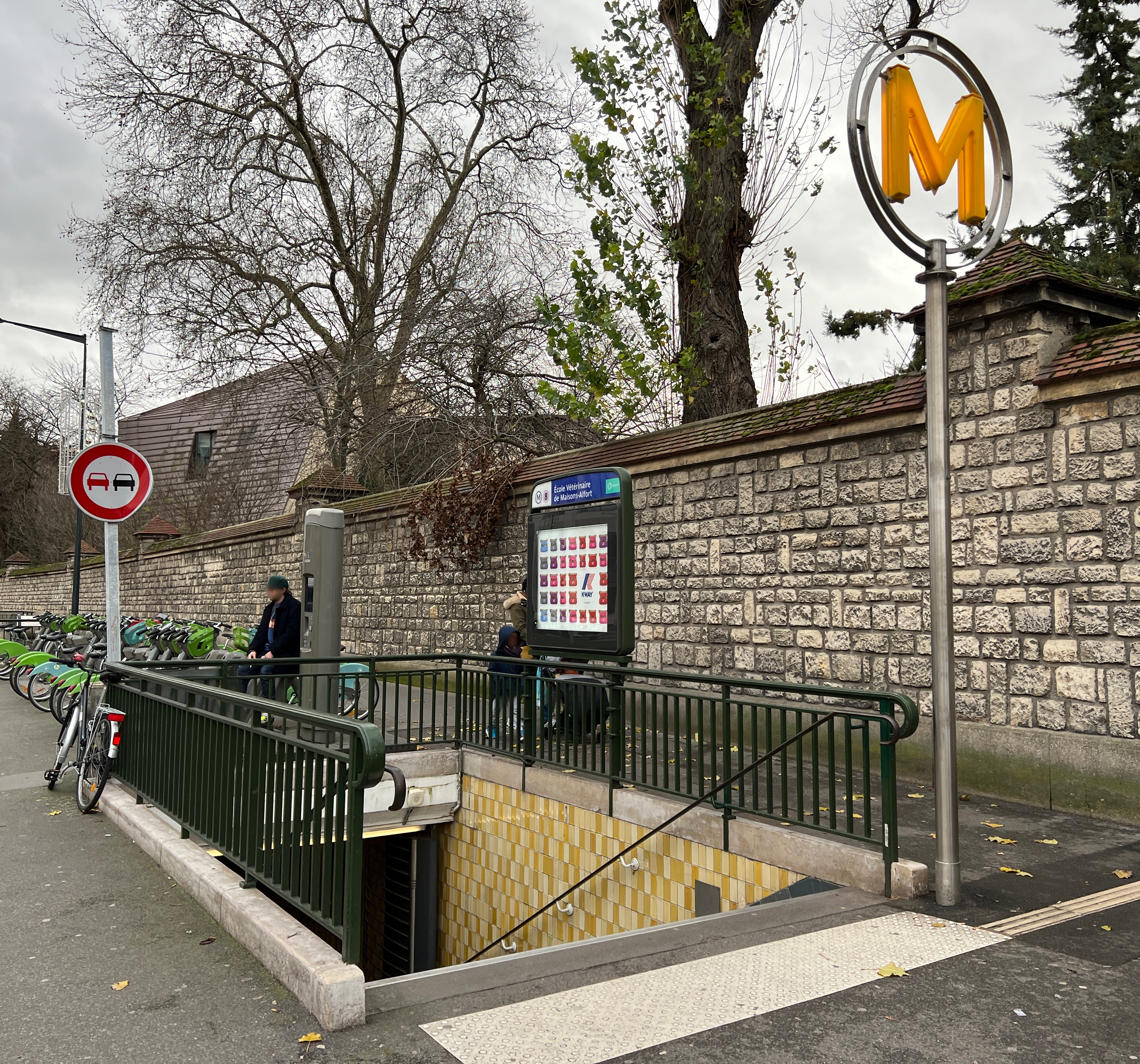
Access 2

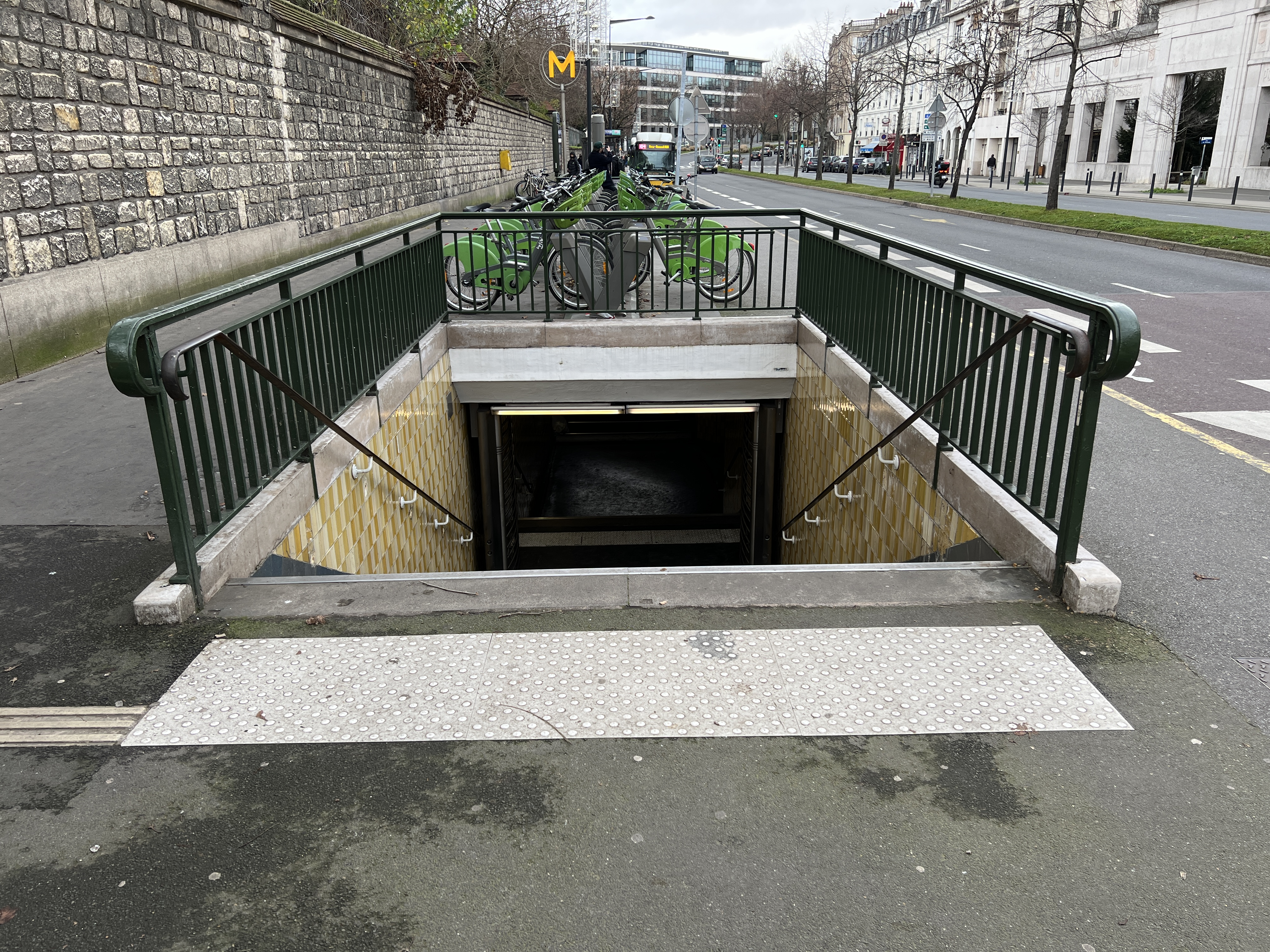
Access 3

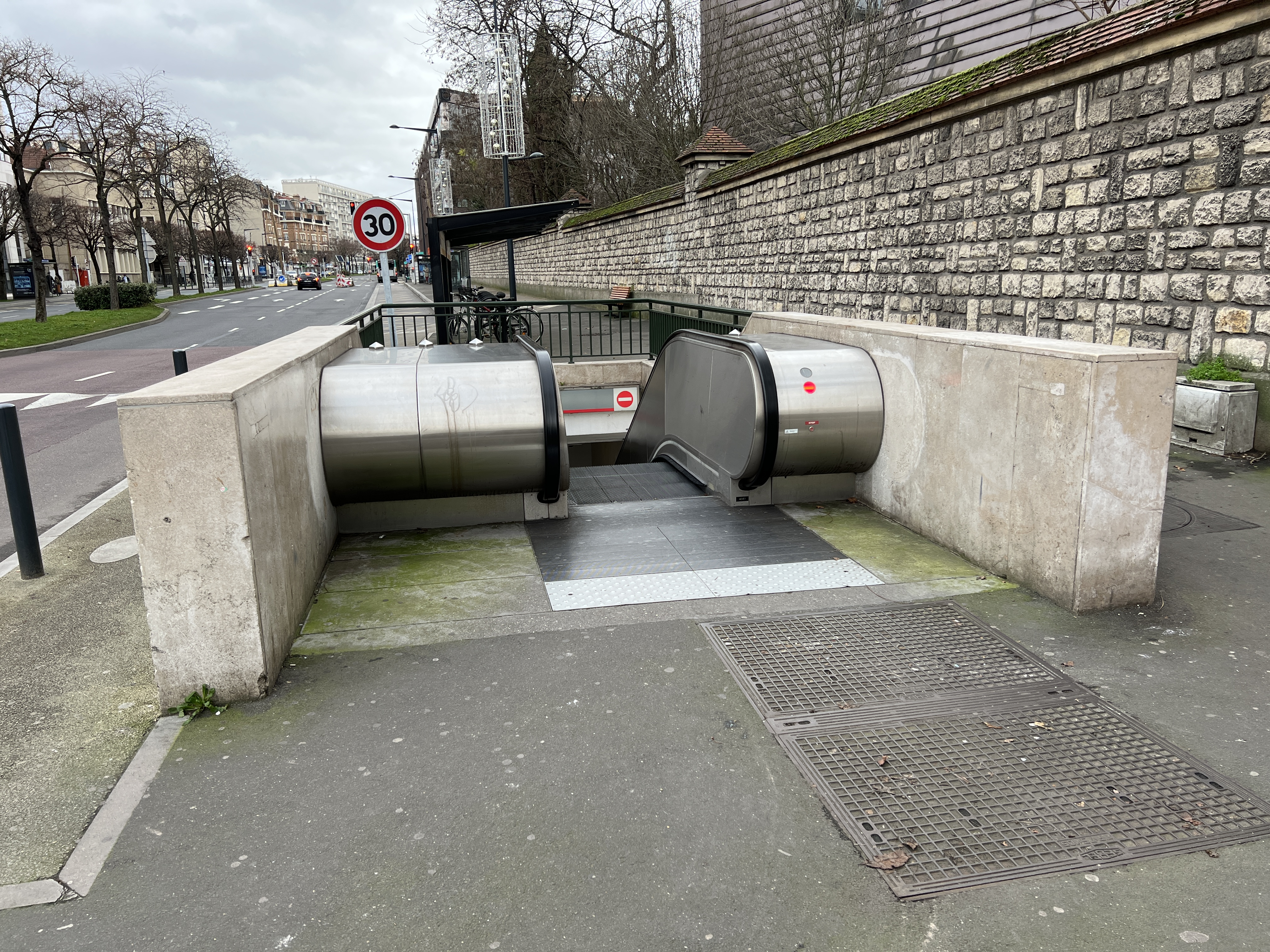
Escalator at access 3
