= Jardin botanique de l'École nationale vétérinaire d'Alfort =

Botanical garden in Île-de-France, France

Coordinates: 48.8126°N 2.4250°E

The Jardin botanique de l'École nationale vétérinaire d'Alfort is a botanical garden operated by the École nationale vétérinaire d'Alfort, and located on the school's grounds at 7, avenue du Général de Gaulle, Maisons-Alfort, Val-de-Marne, Île-de-France, France. It is open to the public; an admission fee is charged.

The garden was first established in 1766 as the school's jardin des plantes under the direction of Honoré Fragonard, and in 1771 began to classify plants according to the botanical system of Joseph Pitton de Tournefort (1656–1708). In 1801, it began to specialize in silkworm cultivation and honey production. By 1882, when the herb garden moved, it contained about 1,600 species classified according to the "Baillon system". During World War I the garden was converted to grow vegetables; though subsequently restored, it was reduced in area by about 4,000 m^{2} in 1930. Garden restoration began in 1960 and accelerated in the late 1970s.

Today the garden contains collections of herbs and toxic and medicinal plants, with a particularly strong collection of melliferous plants (those used for honey production) and beehives, as well as a seed bank containing 1,813 accessions representing 1,700 species (as of 1994).

== See also ==
- Musée Fragonard d'Alfort
- List of botanical gardens in France
