= Maisons-Alfort =

- Commune
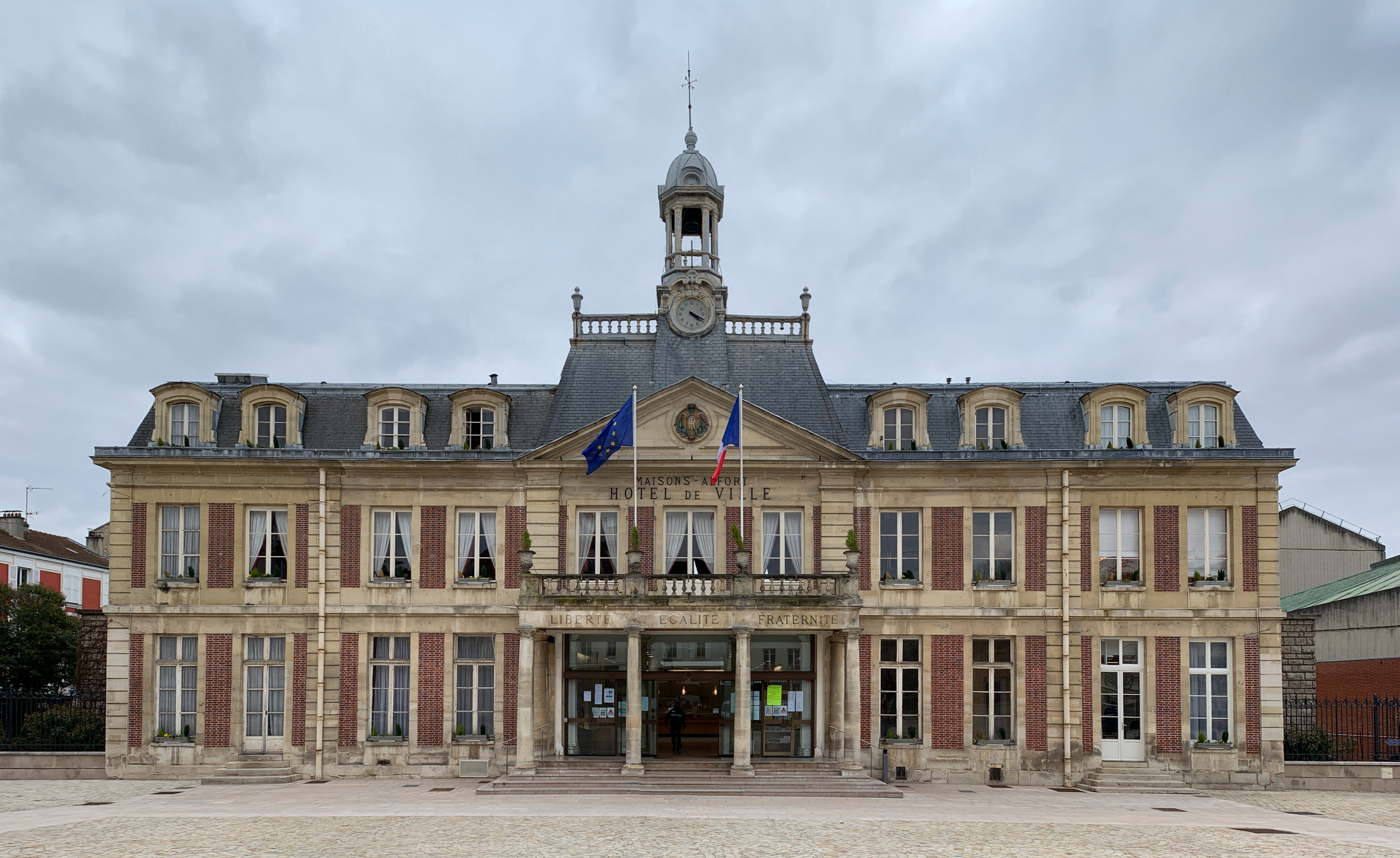
- The Hôtel de Ville

- Coat of arms

- Location (in red) within Paris inner suburbs
- Location of Maisons-Alfort
- Location within France Location within Île-de-France (region)
- Coordinates: 48°48′21″N 2°26′16″E
- Country: France
- Region: Île-de-France
- Department: Val-de-Marne
- Arrondissement: Nogent-sur-Marne
- Canton: Maisons-Alfort
- Intercommunality: Grand Paris

Government
  - Mayor (2026–32): Romain Maria
- Area^{1}: 5.38 km^{2} (2.08 sq mi)
- Highest elevation: 47 m (154 ft)
- Lowest elevation: 24 m (79 ft)
- Population (2023): 56,799
  - Density: 10,600/km^{2} (27,300/sq mi)
- Demonym: Maisonnais
- Time zone: UTC+01:00 (CET)
  - Summer (DST): UTC+02:00 (CEST)
- INSEE/Postal code: 94046 /94700
- Website: maisons-alfort.fr
- ^{1} French Land Register data, which excludes lakes, ponds, glaciers > 1 km^{2} (0.386 sq mi or 247 acres) and river estuaries.

Maisons-Alfort (French pronunciation: [mɛzɔ̃ alfɔʁ]) is a commune in the southeastern suburbs of Paris, France. It is located 8.4 km (5.2 mi) from the centre of Paris.

Maisons-Alfort is famous as the location of the National Veterinary School of Alfort. The Fort de Charenton, constructed between 1841 and 1845, has since 1959 housed the Commandement des Écoles de la Gendarmerie Nationale.

== Name ==
Originally, Maisons-Alfort was called simply Maisons. The name Maisons comes from Medieval Latin Mansiones, meaning "the houses".

At the creation of the commune during the French Revolution, the name of the hamlet of Alfort was joined with the name of Maisons. The name Alfort comes from the manor built there by Peter of Aigueblanche, Bishop of Hereford (England), in the middle of the 13th century. The name of this Manor of Hereford was corrupted into Harefort, then Hallefort, and eventually Alfort. The National Veterinary School of Alfort was settled several centuries later in the manor and its estate.

== History ==
On 1 April 1885, 40% of the territory of Maisons-Alfort was detached and became the commune of Alfortville.

The Hôtel de Ville was officially opened in 1896.

In 1905, Buffalo Bill stayed two months in Maisons-Alfort while his famous Buffalo Bill's Wild West Show performed in Paris.

=== September 1944 explosion ===
At 8.39am on 8 September 1944 a V-2 rocket landed and killed six people at Charentonneau, launched from Petites-Tailles, near Houffalize, in southeast Belgium by Lehr und Versuchsbatterie 444. This was the first destruction caused by a V-2 rocket.

Later that day, a V-2 rocket from Wassenaar in the Netherlands, launched by 485 Artillerie Abteilung at 6.37pm, would hit Staveley Road in west London.

== Demographics ==
The population data in the table and graph below refer to the commune of Maisons-Alfort proper, in its geography at the given years. The commune of Maisons-Alfort ceded the commune of Alfortville in 1885.

Historical population

| Year | Pop. | ±% p.a. |
|---|---|---|
| 1793 | 1,077 | — |
| 1800 | 807 | −4.04% |
| 1806 | 900 | +1.83% |
| 1821 | 615 | −2.51% |
| 1831 | 1,257 | +7.41% |
| 1836 | 1,515 | +3.80% |
| 1841 | 1,892 | +4.54% |
| 1846 | 1,590 | −3.42% |
| 1851 | 1,812 | +2.65% |
| 1856 | 2,317 | +5.04% |
| 1861 | 3,748 | +10.10% |
| 1866 | 4,049 | +1.56% |
| 1872 | 5,890 | +6.45% |
| 1876 | 7,619 | +6.65% |
| 1881 | 9,174 | +3.78% |
| 1886 | 7,034 | −5.17% |
| 1891 | 7,853 | +2.23% |
| 1896 | 9,479 | +3.84% |
| 1901 | 10,547 | +2.16% |

| Year | Pop. | ±% p.a. |
|---|---|---|
| 1906 | 13,409 | +4.92% |
| 1911 | 16,466 | +4.19% |
| 1921 | 20,997 | +2.46% |
| 1926 | 25,108 | +3.64% |
| 1931 | 31,012 | +4.31% |
| 1936 | 34,384 | +2.09% |
| 1946 | 36,485 | +0.59% |
| 1954 | 40,358 | +1.27% |
| 1962 | 51,186 | +3.02% |
| 1968 | 53,149 | +0.63% |
| 1975 | 54,146 | +0.27% |
| 1982 | 51,065 | −0.83% |
| 1990 | 53,375 | +0.55% |
| 1999 | 51,103 | −0.48% |
| 2007 | 53,085 | +0.48% |
| 2012 | 54,186 | +0.41% |
| 2017 | 55,655 | +0.54% |
| 2023 | 56,799 | +0.34% |

Source: EHESS and INSEE (1968–2023)

=== Immigration ===
Place of birth of residents of Maisons-Alfort in 1999
| Born in metropolitan France | Born outside metropolitan France | | | |
|---|---|---|---|---|
| 82.8% | 17.2% | | | |
| 82.8% | Born in overseas France | Born in foreign countries with French citizenship at birth^{1} | EU-15 immigrants^{2} | Non-EU-15 immigrants |
| 82.8% | 1.9% | 3.4% | 3.1% | 8.8% |
^{1} This group is made up largely of former French settlers, such as pieds-noirs in Northwest Africa, followed by former colonial citizens who had French citizenship at birth (such as was often the case for the native elite in French colonies), as well as to a lesser extent foreign-born children of French expatriates. A foreign country is understood as a country not part of France in 1999, so a person born for example in 1950 in Algeria, when Algeria was an integral part of France, is nonetheless listed as a person born in a foreign country in French statistics.^{2} An immigrant is a person born in a foreign country not having French citizenship at birth. An immigrant may have acquired French citizenship since moving to France, but is still considered an immigrant in French statistics. On the other hand, persons born in France with foreign citizenship (the children of immigrants) are not listed as immigrants.

== Administration ==
Maisons-Alfort is part of the arrondissement of Nogent-sur-Marne. It is the only commune of the canton of Maisons-Alfort.

== Points of interest ==
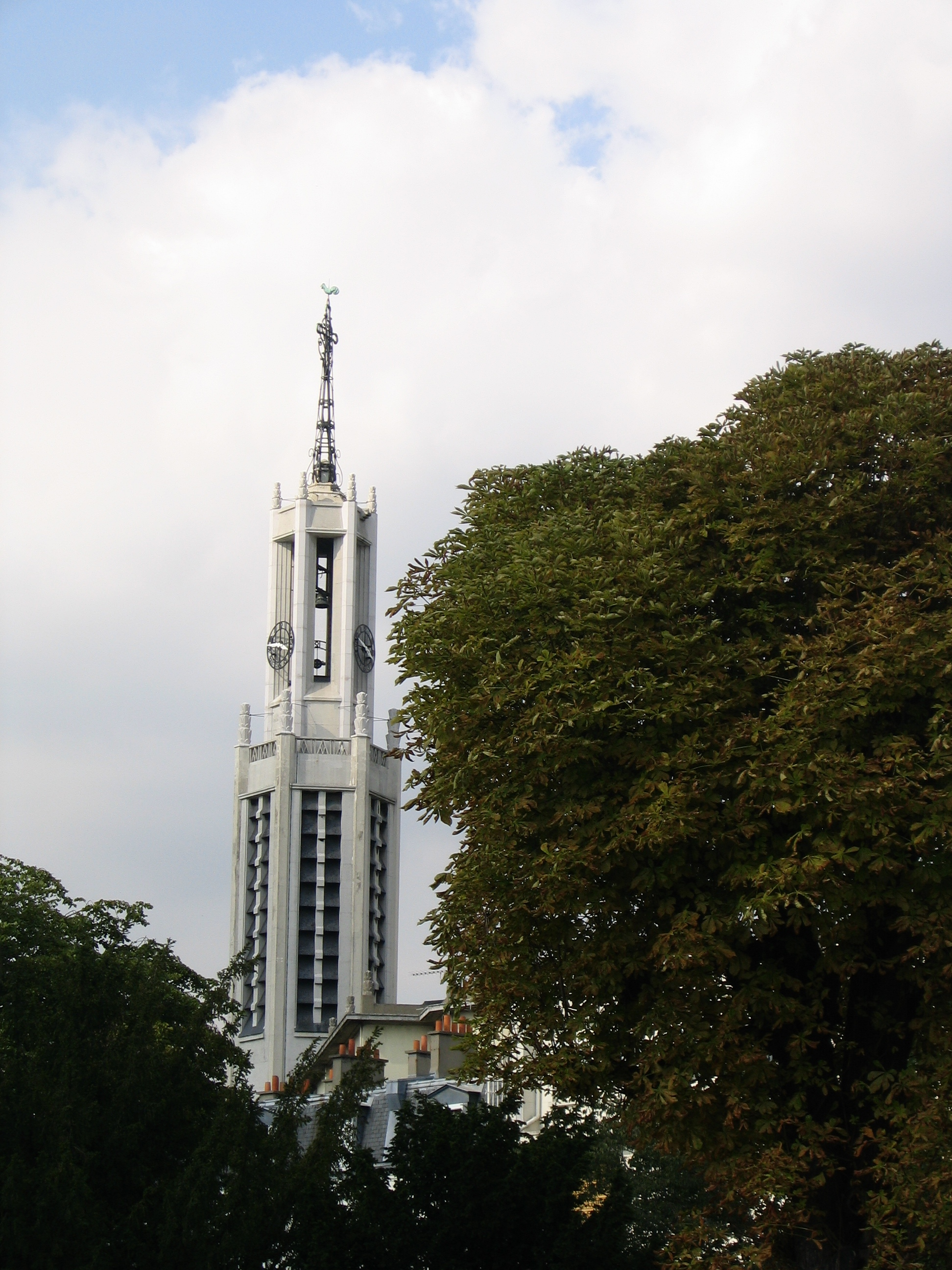
The church of Sainte-Agnès, in Maisons-Alfort

- École nationale vétérinaire d'Alfort
- Fort de Charenton
- Jardin botanique de l'École nationale vétérinaire d'Alfort
- Musée Fragonard d'Alfort
- Château de Réghat

== Education ==
The commune has:

- 13 public preschools (écoles maternelles)
- 12 public elementary schools
- Three private preschools and elementary schools: Ecole Privée Notre-Dame, Ecole et collège Privée Sainte-Thérèse
- Four public junior high schools: Collège Condorcet, Collège Edouard Herriot, Collège Jules Ferry, Collège Nicolas de Staël
- One private elementary and junior high school, Ecole et collège Privée Sainte-Thérèse
- Two public senior high schools/sixth-form colleges: Lycée Eugène Delacroix and Lycée Professionnel Paul Bert

== Personalities ==
- Tariq Abdul-Wahad, basketball player
- Thomas N'Gijol, comedian
- Ladjie Soukouna, footballer
- Nicole Tourneur, novelist

== International relations ==
Maisons-Alfort is twinned with Moers in the German state of North Rhine-Westphalia.

== Transport ==
Maisons-Alfort is served by three stations on Paris Métro Line 8: École Vétérinaire de Maisons-Alfort, Maisons-Alfort–Stade, and Maisons-Alfort–Les Juilliottes.

It is also served by two stations on Paris RER D: Maisons-Alfort–Alfortville and Le Vert de Maisons.

== See also ==
- Communes of the Val-de-Marne department
- Charenton Metro-Viaduct
