= École nationale vétérinaire d'Alfort =

Veterinary school in France

Coordinates: 48°48′52″N 2°25′19″E

École Nationale Vétérinaire d'Alfort
- Type: Public veterinary school
- Established: 1765
- Principal: Christophe Degueurce
- Students: 800
- Location: Maisons-Alfort, Ile-de-France, France
- Affiliations: Paris-Est Créteil Val-de-Marne University
- Website: www.vet-alfort.fr

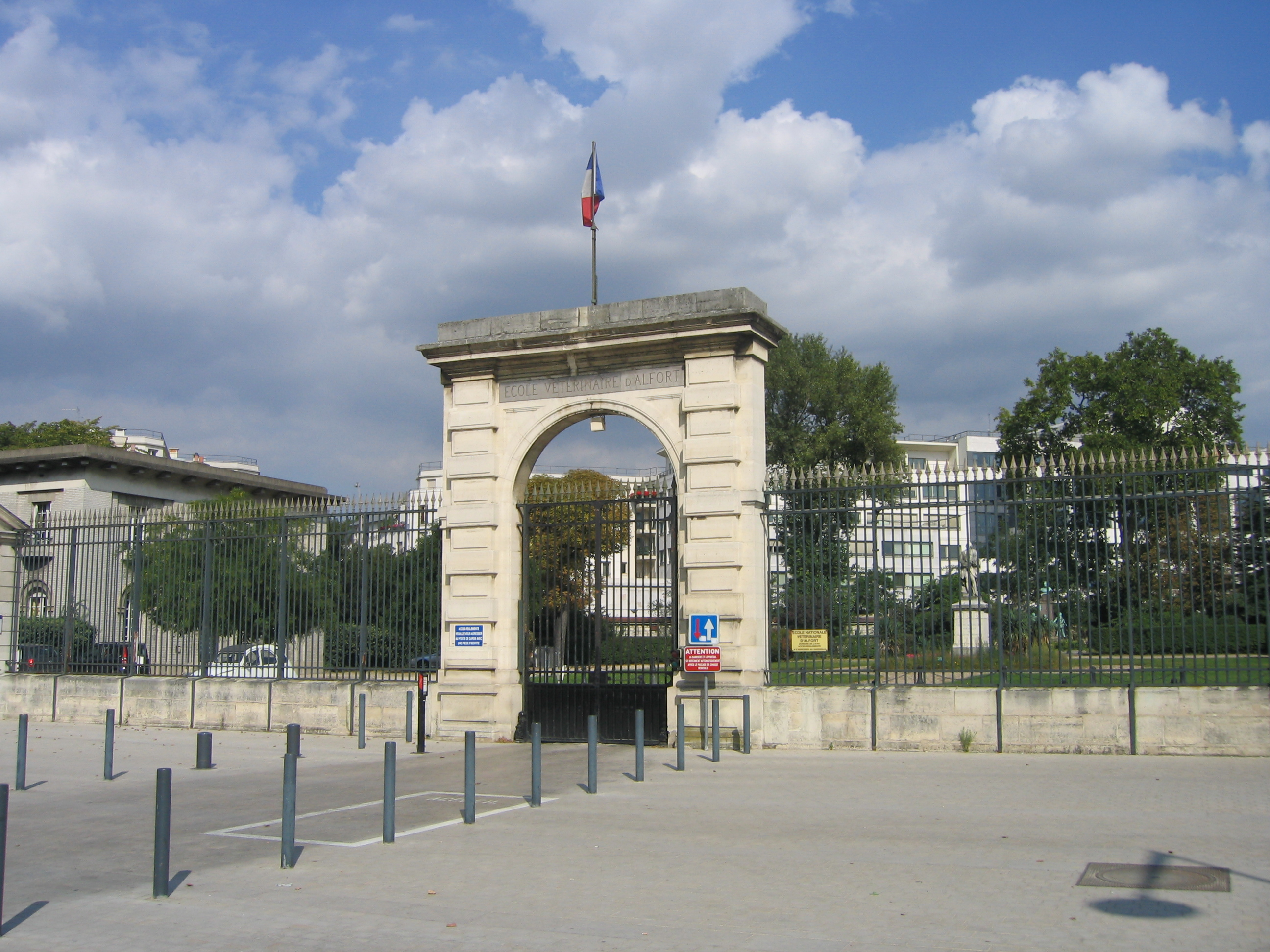
The entrance gate

The National veterinary school of Alfort (French: École nationale vétérinaire d'Alfort or ENVA) is a French public institution of scientific research and higher education in veterinary medicine, located in Maisons-Alfort, Val-de-Marne, close to Paris. It is operated under the supervision of the ministry of Agriculture.

This is one of the four public schools providing veterinary education in France.

See detailed article Veterinary education in France

The school was established in 1765 by Claude Bourgelat and moved to its current location in 1766. The school received immediate international recognition throughout the eighteenth century, and was especially famous for its collection of anatomical and natural history specimens. In 2007, ENVA came close to the University; she was a founding member of the PRES Université Paris-Est ; she became an external school of the university of Paris-Est Créteil Val-de-Marne in January 2012.

Today the school contains about 800 students, 75 lecturers, and 45 researchers. It also contains a most unusual museum, the Fragonard Museum, and a garden, the botanical garden of the National veterinary school of Alfort; both are open to the public.

This site is served by Paris métro station École vétérinaire de Maisons-Alfort.

== See also ==
- Jardin botanique de l'École nationale vétérinaire d'Alfort
- Musée Fragonard d'Alfort
