= Saʽid =

Sa'id سعيد
- Pronunciation: Arabic: [saˈʕiːd] Persian: [sæˈʔiːd] Maltese: [sɐˤˈiːt]
- Gender: Male

Origin
- Origin: Arabic
- Meaning: Happy

Saʽid (Arabic: سعيد Saʽīd), also spelled Saʽeid, Said, Saïd, Sid, Saeed, Saed, Saied, Sayeed or Sayid, is a male Arabic given name which means "blessed, lucky, joy" or "happy, patient". The name stems from the Arabic verb sa‘ada (سَعَدَ – 'to be happy, fortunate or lucky').

The lesser uncommon form of the name Saʽid is "Suʽid (سُعِيد suʽīd)" and the feminine form of the name is Saida (Saʽidah, سَعِيدة saʽīdah) or Suida (Suʽidah, سُعِيدة suʽīdah). Saʽid is another variant from the Arabic given name Saad.

The written form of the name in Turkish is Sait and in Bosnian is Seid. Said or Sid is the spelling used in most Latin languages.

== Given name ==
=== First ===
- Sa'id of Egypt (or Sa'id Pasha, 1822–1863), Ottoman Viceroy and Egyptian ruler for whom Port Said is named
- Said Salah Ahmed, Somali playwright, poet, educator and filmmaker.
- Saeed Ajmal (born 1977), Pakistani cricketer
- Saeid Alihosseini (born 1988), Iranian weightlifter
- Said Assagaff (1953–2025), Indonesian politician
- Said Salim Bakhresa (born 1949), Tanzanian businessman
- Said Bahaji (1975–2013), German al-Qaeda member
- Saeid Bayat (born 1976), Iranian football midfielder
- Saeed Blacknall (born 1996), American football player
- Saïd Boualam (1906–1982), Algerian-French military officer, politician and activist
- Saïd Bouteflika (born 1958), Algerian politician and brother of former Algerian President Abdelaziz Bouteflika
- Saïd Bouziri (1947–2009), Tunisian human rights and immigrant rights activist in France
- Saeid Davarpanah (born 1987), Iranian professional basketball player
- Saeid Ebrahimi (born 1982), Iranian wrestler
- Saeed al-Ghamdi (1979–2001), Saudi terrorist and 9/11 hijacker
- Said al-Ghazzi (1893–1967), Syrian lawyer and politician
- Saeed Hanaei (1962–2002), Iranian serial killer
- Sa'id Hormozi (1898–1976), Iranian musician
- Saeed Izadi (1964–2025), Iranian brigadier general
- Sa'id ibn Jubayr (665–714), one of the leading Tabi‘un
- Said Kamal (1938–2017), Palestinian politician
- Sultan Said Khan (1487–1533), ruler of Kashgaria in 1514–1533
- Saeid Marouf (born 1985), a volleyball player from Iran
- Saeed al-Masri (1955–2010), Egyptian al-Qaeda member
- Saeed Akhtar Mirza (born 1943), Indian film director
- Saeed Mozaffari (1942–2025), Iranian dubbing director and voice actor
- Saeid Mozaffarizadeh (born 1974), Iranian football referee
- Said Musa (born 1944), Belizean politician
- Saeed Nafisi (1895–1966), Iranian scholar
- Saeed Naqvi (born 1940), Indian journalist
- Said Nursî (1878–1960), Muslim Scholar from Turkey
- Said Paulo Arges (1905–1994), Brazilian footballer
- Saeid Pirdoost (born 1941), Iranian actor
- Said Sheikh Samatar (1943–2015), Somali historian
- Said Mohammad Sammour (born 1950), Syrian politician
- Said Shavershian (born 1986), Australian bodybuilder
- Said Ali al-Shihri (1971–2013), Saudi Arabian al-Qaeda member
- Said bin Sultan (1797–1856), Sultan of Muscat and Oman
- Saïd Taghmaoui (born 1973), French actor
- Said bin Taimur (1910–1972), previous Sultan of Oman
- Sa'id ibn Uthman (died 680), one of the Tabi‘un and son of Uthman
- Saeed Abubakr Zakaria, 21st-century Ghanaian scholar and leading member of Ahlus Sunnah Wal Jamaa'a
- Sa'id bin Zayd (593–673), one of the companions of Muhammed
- Sait Celebi, who is a prominent 18th-century Ottoman statesman, diplomat, grand vizier and the Grand Lodge of Free and Accepted Masons of Türkiye as the first known Muslim Turkish Freemason.

=== Middle ===
- Ali Said Raygal, Somali politician
- Mehmed Said Pasha (or Said Pasha, 1830–1914), Ottoman Grand Vizier
- Rami Malek, Coptic-American actor

=== Kunya ===
- Abu Sa'id (Ilkhanid dynasty) (1316–1335), ninth ruler of the Ilkhanate state in Iran
- Abu Sa'id (Timurid dynasty) (1424–1469), mid-fifteenth century Timurid Empire ruler in what are today parts of Persia and Afghanistan
- Abu Said Faraj (1248–1320), a Nasrid prince of Granada
- Abu Sa'id al-Khudri (612/13–693/94), early ally of the prophet Muhammad
- Abū-Sa'īd Abul-Khayr (967–1049), Persian Sufi and poet
- Khaled al-Hassan (1928–1994), known as Abu Said, Palestine Liberation Organization leader
- Abu Saeed Muhammad Omar Ali (1919–2012), Bangladeshi Islamic scholar and translator

== Surname ==
- Abdallah El Said (born 1985), Egyptian footballer
- Abdelmadjid Sidi Said (born 1949), leader of the Algerian trade union UGTA
- Abdulla Saeed (born 1964), chief justice of the Maldives
- Amina Said (born 1953), Tunisian poet
- Anjum Saeed (born 1968), Pakistani field hockey player
- Anne Said (1914–1995), English artist
- Azmat Saeed (1954–2025), Pakistani judge, justice of the supreme court
- Boris Said (born 1962), American race car driver
- Brian Said (born 1973), Maltese footballer
- Edward Said (1935–2003), Palestinian-American literary critic and theorist
- Hakim Said (1920–1998), Pakistani physician and scholar
- Hilda Saeed (1936–2025), Pakistani activist and journalist
- Hussein Saeed (born 1958), Iraqi footballer
- Humayun Saeed (born 1971), Pakistani actor and producer
- Islam Said, birth name of musician "Islam Chipsy"
- Kais Saied (born 1958), Tunisian politician
- Kurban Said, pseudonym for the author of the novel Ali and Nino
- Mahmoud Saeed (1939–2025), Iraqi-born American novelist
- Nasser Al Saeed (1923–??), Saudi Arabian writer
- Samira Said (born 1961), Moroccan pop star
- Suzanne Saïd (1939–2024), French classical scholar
- Wafic Saïd (born 1939), Syrian businessman
- Yaser Abdel Said (born 1957), FBI Top 10 Most Wanted fugitive
- Qaboos bin Said Al Said (1940–2020), previous Sultan of Oman
- Harun bin Said or Harun Thohir (1943–1968), birth name Tahir bin Mandir, Indonesian soldier and terrorist

== In Christendom ==
The Maltese surname Saïd has the same origin but has been borne by Latin Catholics for over seven centuries. Most Maltese surnames are of Italian origin, but this (with Abdilla) is one of the very few authentically Arabic given names that have survived in the islands as family names. It is a variant of the medieval Sicilian Christian surname Saido or Saito (Saidu), which was derived from the Siculo-Arabic given name Sa'īd used by both Muslims and Christians. In Sicily and Malta, this surname was sometimes Italianized as (De) Felice.

The surname was established in Malta by 1419, appearing mostly as Sayd in the militia list of that year. In the 1480 militia list it is spelt mostly Said, but was later variously written Said, Sayd, Sajt, Sait in the Catholic church census of 1687.

Today, francophone countries use transliterations of that name. These include the name Seydou, which is common in West Africa.

== Fictional characters ==
- Sayid Jarrah, character on the television series Lost
- Kareem Saïd, character on the HBO drama Oz
- Said Rachid, character on the television series O Clone, interpreted by Dalton Vigh.
- Mustafa Sa'eed, protagonist of the novel Season of Migration to the North
- Saïd, character on the movie La Haine

== Other uses ==
- al-Ṣaʿīd (spelled with a Ṣād, صعيد) is the Arabic term for Upper Egypt. The personal name is related to a different root, whose first letter is Sīn.
  - Sa'idi people refers to the inhabitants of Upper Egypt.
- Saïd Business School at Oxford University, name after Wafic Saïd

== See also ==
- Kunya (Arabic)
- Saidi (name)
- Bensaïd
- Essaïd
- Seydou
- Seydoux
- Sheikh Said (disambiguation)
- Syed, similar name with different pronunciation
- Suat
