= Sait =

Sait may refer to:

== People ==
Sait is a popular male given name in Turkey. The name is also spelled in Arabic as Saʽid, Saïd, Sid, Saeed, Saed, Saied, Sayeed. It has deep roots in Arabic culture and Islamic history and denotes prosperity, fortune, honor, and happiness. Beyond "fortunate", the name carries a deep theological significance in Turkish culture, often referring to a righteous person destined for paradise.

- Sait Faik Abasıyanık (1906–1954), Turkish writer
- Talât Sait Halman (1931–2014), Turkish poet
- Sait Idrizi (born 1990), Slovenian footballer
- Mehmed Said Pasha (1838–1914), Ottoman statesman
- Mustafa Sait Yazıcıoğlu (born 1949), Turkish politician
- Paul Sait (1947–2023), Australian rugby league player
- Kevin Sait (born 1956), Australian Rules Footballer
- Danish Sait (born 1988), Indian radio and television host
- Kubbra Sait, Indian actress

== Organisations ==
- Samsung Advanced Institute of Technology
- San Agustin Institute of Technology, an educational institution in the Philippines
- Southern Alberta Institute of Technology, Canada
- South African Institute of Taxation
- South Australian Institute of Technology, forerunner of University of South Australia

== Other uses ==
- Sait (clan), a community who originally hail from Kutch in Gujarat, India
- Super Advanced Intelligent Tape, a tape data storage format

== See also ==
- Saʽid
- Salt (disambiguation)
