= Seydou =

Seydou is the Francophonic-orthography variant of the Arabic name Sa'id, commonly used in West Africa.

Notable people with the name include:

== People with the given name Seydou ==
- Seydou Barry (1943–2007), Senegalese painter
- Seydou Bouda (born 1958), Burkinabé politician and US Ambassador
- Seydou Diarra (1933–2020), Ivorian political figure, Prime Minister in 2000 and from 2003 to 2005
- Seydou Doumbia (born 1987), Ivorian footballer
- Seydou Badjan Kanté (born 1981), Ivory Coast-born football defender
- Seydou Keita (born 1980), Malian footballer
- Seydou Keïta (1921–2001), self-taught portrait photographer from Bamako
- Seydou Koné (born 1983), Ivorian footballer
- Seydou Badian Kouyaté (born 1928), Malian writer and politician
- Seydou Njoya (1902–1992), ruled the Bamum people of Cameroon from 1933 to 1992
- Seydou Traoré (footballer) (born 1970), Burkinabé footballer
- Seydou Traoré (politician) (1936–1992), Upper Voltan veterinarian and politician
- Seydou Traore (American football), English-American football player

== People with the middle name Seydou ==
- Mohamed Seydou Dera (born 1986), Côte d'Ivoire footballer
- Pape Seydou Diop (born 1979), Senegalese international footballer

== People with the surname Seydou ==
- Chris Seydou (1949–1994), Malian fashion designer
- Mayaki Seydou (born 1949), Nigerian bantamweight boxer
