= Charles Vial de Sainbel =

French veterinary surgeon who settled in England (1753–1793)

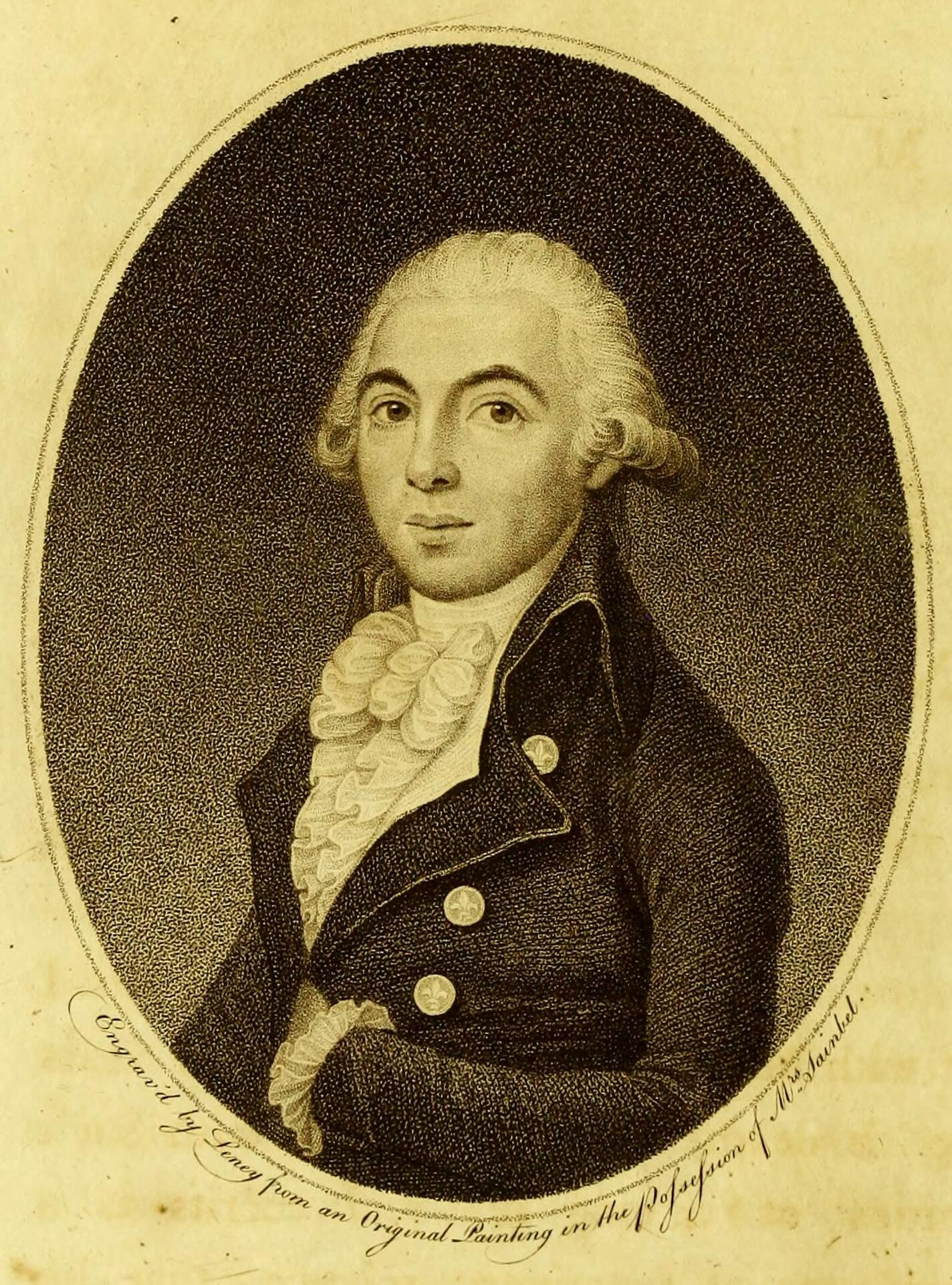
Engraved portrait published with Sainbel's collected works (1795)

Charles Vial de Sainbel or Saint Bel (1753–1793) was a French veterinary surgeon who settled in the Kingdom of Great Britain. He was born at Lyons; studied under Claude Bourgelat; became assistant-surgeon and public demonstrator at the veterinary college at Lyons in 1773; distinguished himself during an epizootic among horses in France in 1774; became assistant-professor at the Royal Veterinary College, Paris; veterinary surgeon and physician at Lyons; equerry to Louis XVI and chief of manege at the academy at Lyons. He came to England in 1788; the Veterinary College of London was instituted with Sainbel as professor in 1791. He wrote works on veterinary surgery (some published posthumously).

== France ==
Charles Vial de Sainbel was born at Lyons on 28 January 1753, during the mayoralty of his grandfather. The family had long possessed an estate at Sain-Bel, near Lyons. His grandfather, the mayor, and both his parents died in 1756, and he was educated by his guardian, M. de Flesseille. He early displayed so marked a fondness for studying the organisation of animals that at the age of sixteen he began to attend the veterinary school, where M. Péan was then the professor, and in 1772 he gained the prize offered by the Royal Society of Medicine, with an essay On the Grease or Watery Sores in the Legs of Horses. He also studied under the great Claude Bourgelat, the father of veterinary science. He was appointed in 1772 lecturer and demonstrator to a class of sixteen pupils, and in 1773 he was made upper student, assistant-surgeon, and one of the public demonstrators, a post of great importance on account of the extensive practice which it involved and the opportunity it afforded of obtaining patrons. In 1774 an extensive epizootic raged among the horses in many provinces of France, and Sainbel was ordered to choose five students from the veterinary college at Lyons to accompany him in his provincial visits, and to assist in stopping the outbreak of disease. He accomplished his mission so satisfactorily that the King sent for him to Paris, and appointed him one of the junior professorial assistants at the Royal Veterinary College in the metropolis. Here he soon incurred the envy of his senior colleagues, one of whom threatened to have him confined in the Bastille by a lettre de cachet. He therefore left Paris and returned to Lyons, where he practised for some time as a veterinary physician and surgeon. He then held for five years the post of professor of comparative anatomy in the veterinary college at Montpellier. He afterwards returned to Paris under the patronage of the Prince de Lambesc, and was appointed one of the equerries to Louis XVI, and chief of the manège at the academy of Lyons, posts which he retained for three years.

== England ==
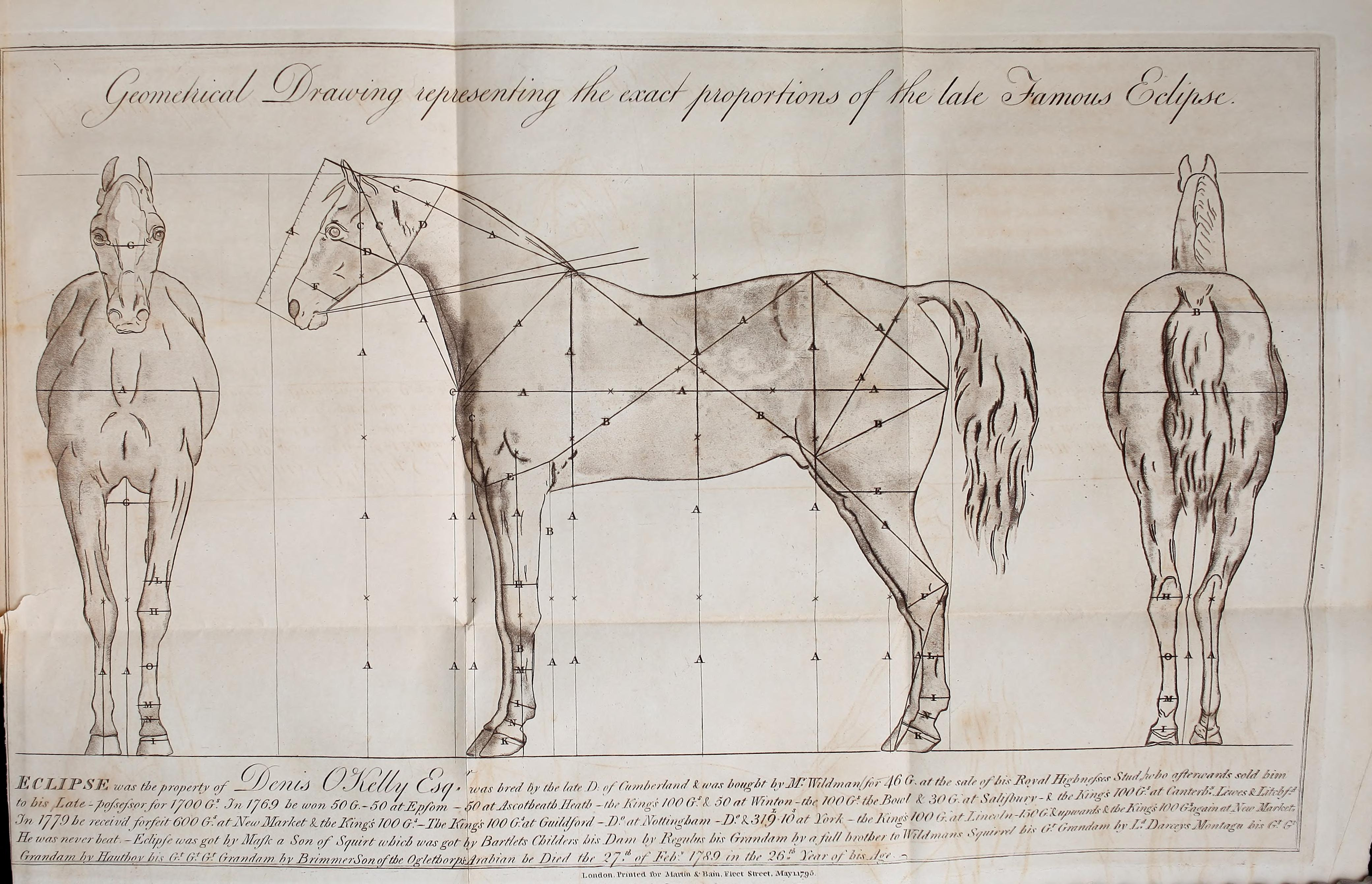
Geometrical Drawing representing the exact proportions of the late Famous Eclipse (1795)

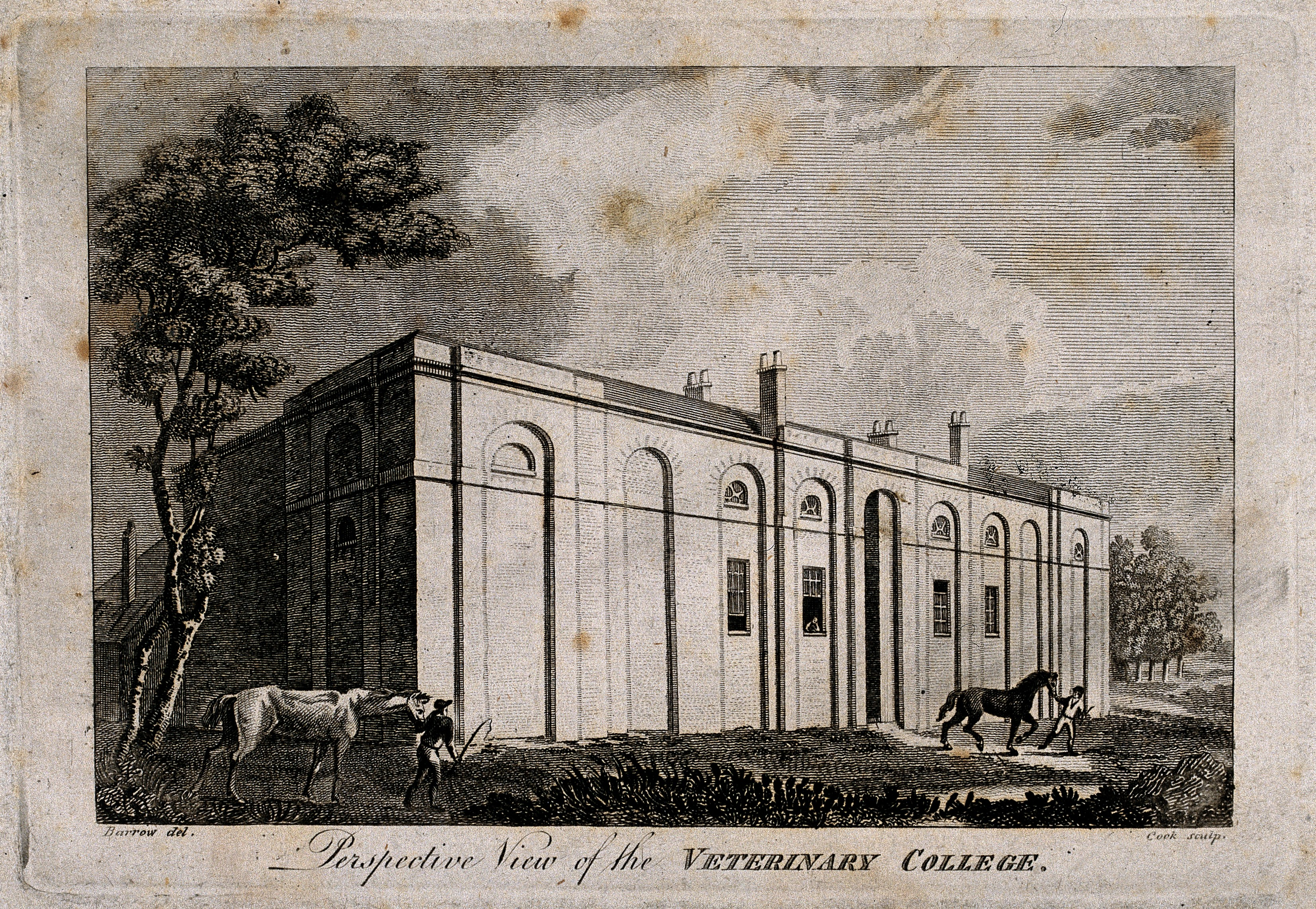
Perspective View of the Veterinary College, London (c. 1800)

Sainbel came to England in June 1788, provided with letters of introduction to Sir Joseph Banks, Dr. Simmons and Dr. Layard of Greenwich, and in the following September he published proposals for founding a veterinary school in England. The project was unsuccessful, and, after marrying an English wife, Sainbel returned to Paris. He found that the Revolution was impending in France, and he quickly came back to England, under the pretext of buying horses for the stud of his sovereign. His patrimonial estate of Sainbel was confiscated during the Revolution, and he was proscribed as an émigré.

On 27 February 1789 he was requested by Dennis O'Kelly to dissect the body of the great racehorse Eclipse. He did so, and his essay on the proportions of Eclipse brought him the highest reputation as a veterinary anatomist. In 1791 the Odiham Society for the Improvement of Agriculture took up Sainbel's scheme of founding a school of veterinary medicine and surgery in this country. A preliminary meeting was held on 11 February 1791 at the Blenheim coffee-house in Bond Street, and on 18 February in the same year it was decided to form an institution to be called the Veterinary College of London, with Sainbel as professor. The college began its work, but Sainbel died, after a short illness, on 21 August 1793, in the fortieth year of his age. He was buried in the vault under the Savoy Chapel in the Strand. The college granted his widow an annuity of 50l.

== Legacy ==
According to the Dictionary of National Biography,

Sainbel may justly be looked upon as the founder of scientific veterinary practice in England. Hitherto, owing to the ignorance of cattle-disease, the loss of animal life had been very great, and farriers had depended upon antiquated or empirical treatises such as those of Gervase Markham. Like all innovators, Sainbel had much to contend against; but the lines which he laid down were faithfully followed in England and in Scotland, and led from the merest empiricism to the scientific position now held by veterinary science. Sainbel was essentially an honourable man, following the best traditions of the old régime in France. That he was a first-rate anatomist and a scientific veterinary surgeon is proved by his writings.

An engraving of a half-length portrait is prefixed to Sainbel's collected works.

=== Commemorations ===
The Royal Veterinary College awards the Vial de St. Bel Medal annually to the BVetMed student who attains the highest overall grade in the final year of the course. The medal commemorates Sainbel’s foundational role in the establishment of veterinary education in Britain.

== Works ==
He was author of:

1. Essai sur les Proportions Géométrales de l'Éclipse, French and English, London, 4to, 1791; 2nd edit. 1795. This work was originally inscribed to the Prince of Wales, and was illustrated with careful geometrical drawings, representing the exact proportions of the famous racehorse. Sainbel endeavoured in this essay to analyse the component parts of a horse's gallop, but his conclusions have since been much modified by the instantaneous photographs obtained by Marey, Stanford, Muybridge, Stillman, and other observers.
2. Lectures on the Elements of Farriery, London, 1793, 4to.
3. A posthumous volume, issued in 1795 for the benefit of Sainbel's widow, containing translations into English of four essays originally published in French; the English titles ran: General Observations on the Art of Veterinary Medicine; An Essay on the Grease or Watery Sores in the Legs of Horses (this essay was written when Sainbel was only eighteen, and it gained him the prize given by the Royal Society of Medicine of France); Experiments and Observations made upon Glandered Horses with intent to elucidate the Rise and Progress of this Disease, in order to discover the proper treatment of it; Short Observations on the Colic or Gripes: more particularly that kind to which racehorses are liable.
4. (Also posthumously published) The Sportsman, Farrier, and Shoeing Smith's New Guide, edited by J. Lawrence, London, (1800?), 12mo.

== Gallery ==
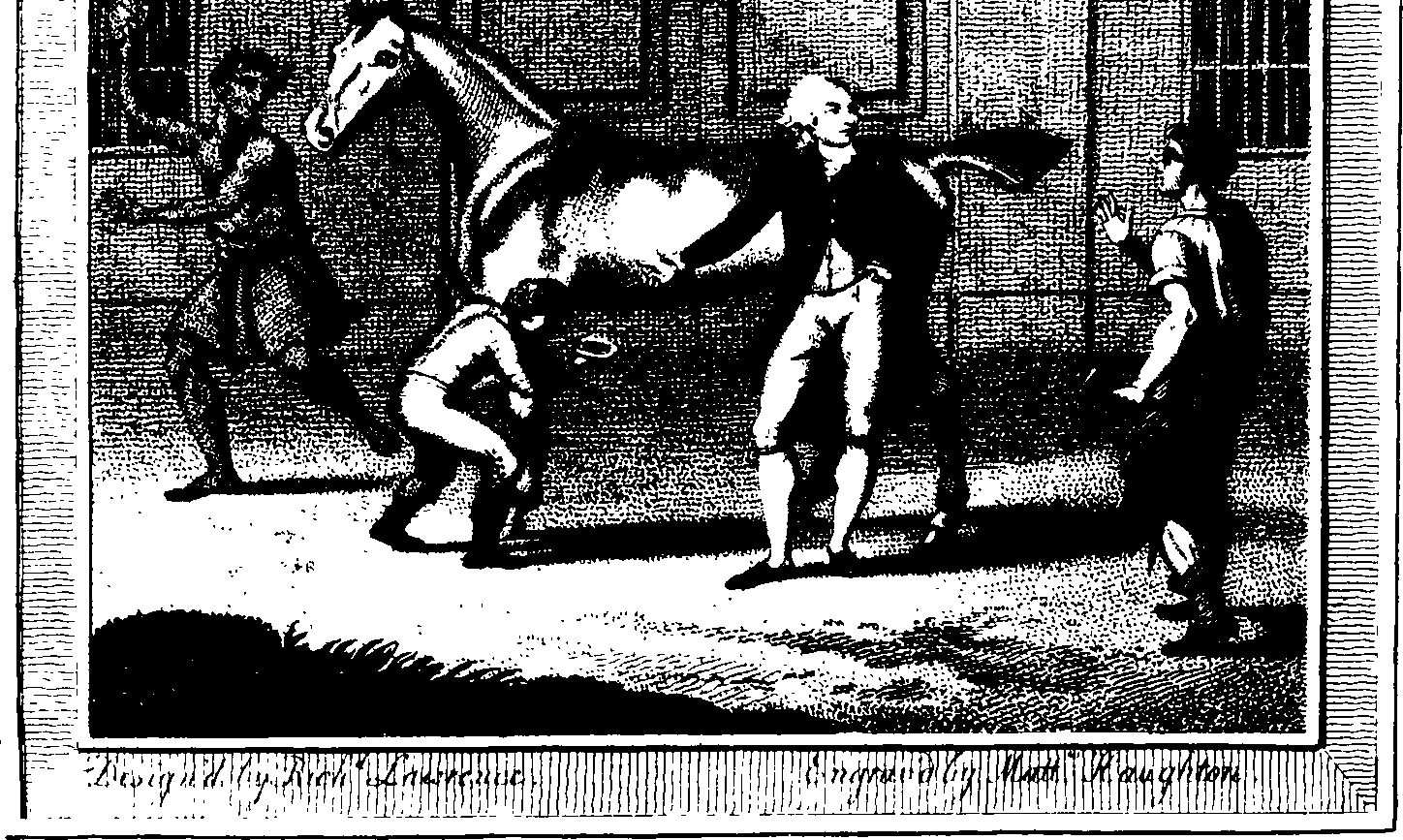

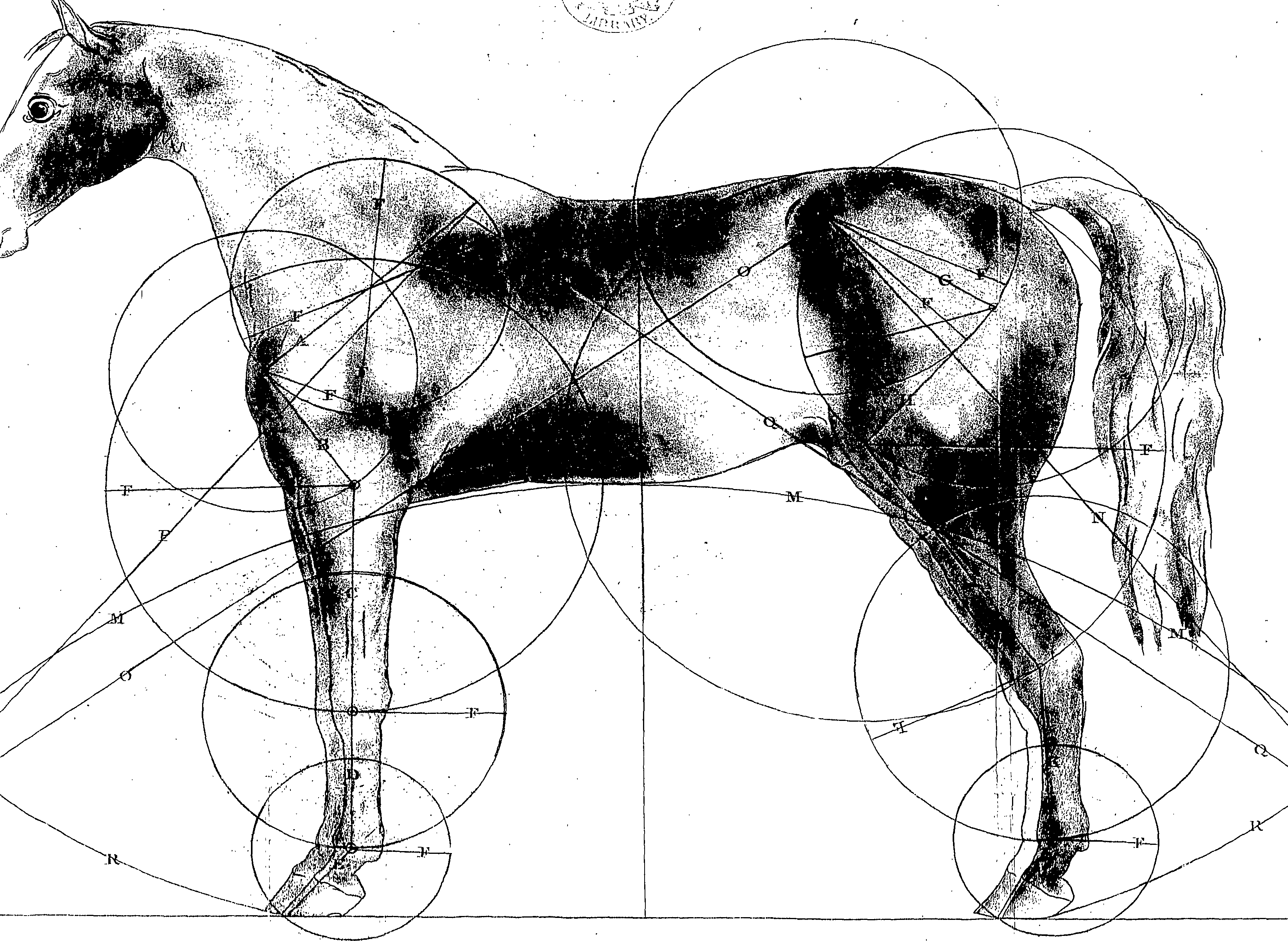

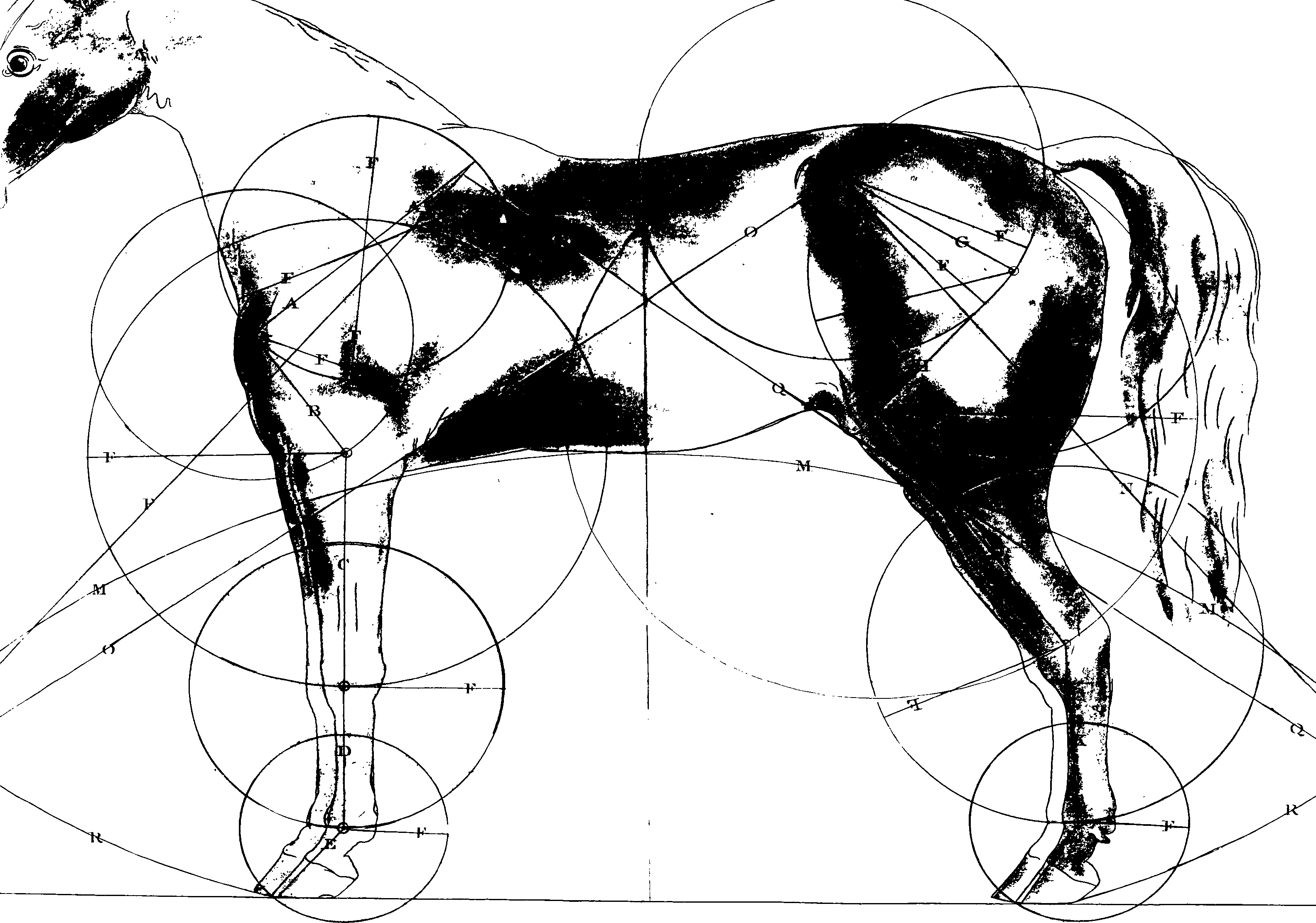

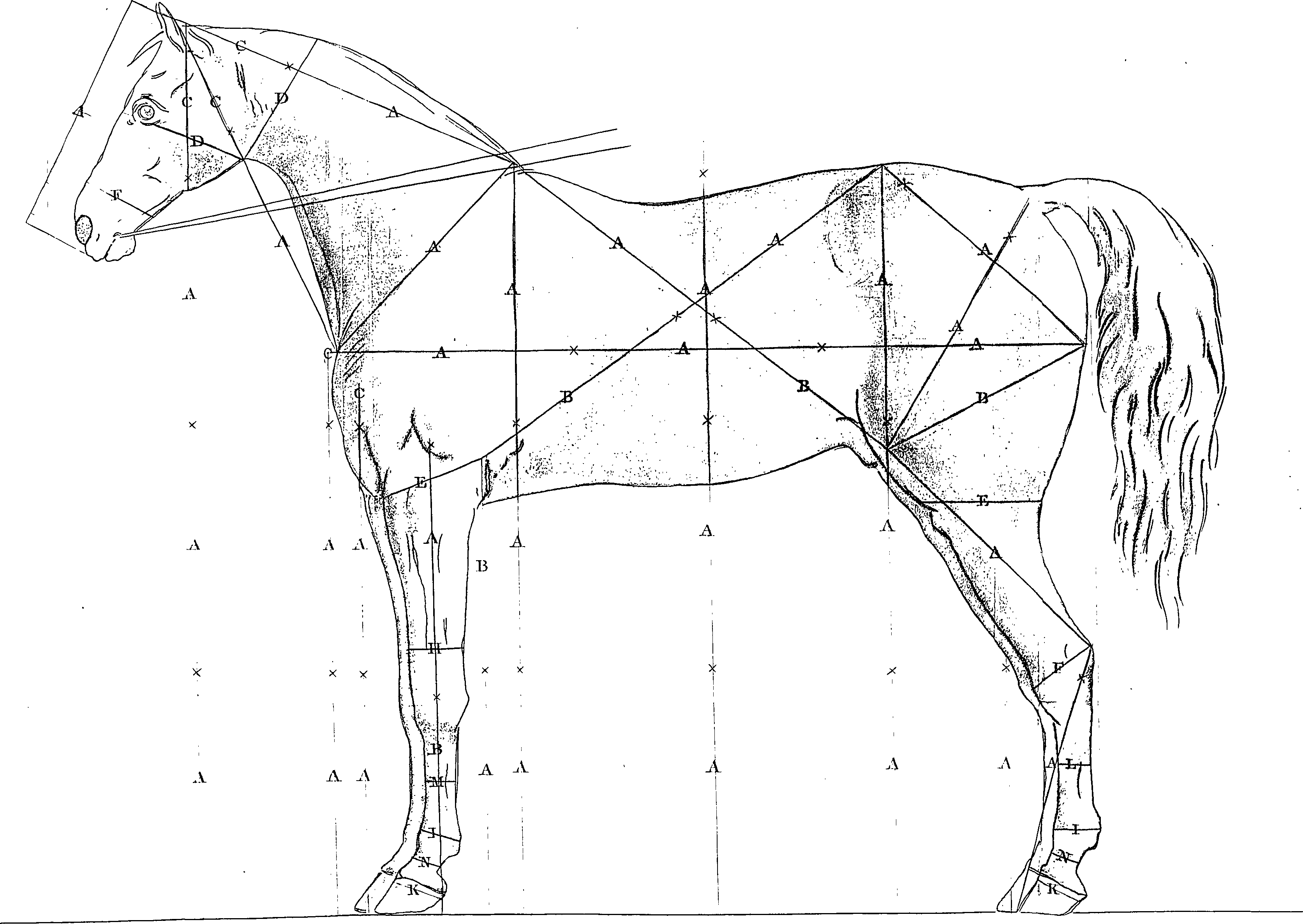

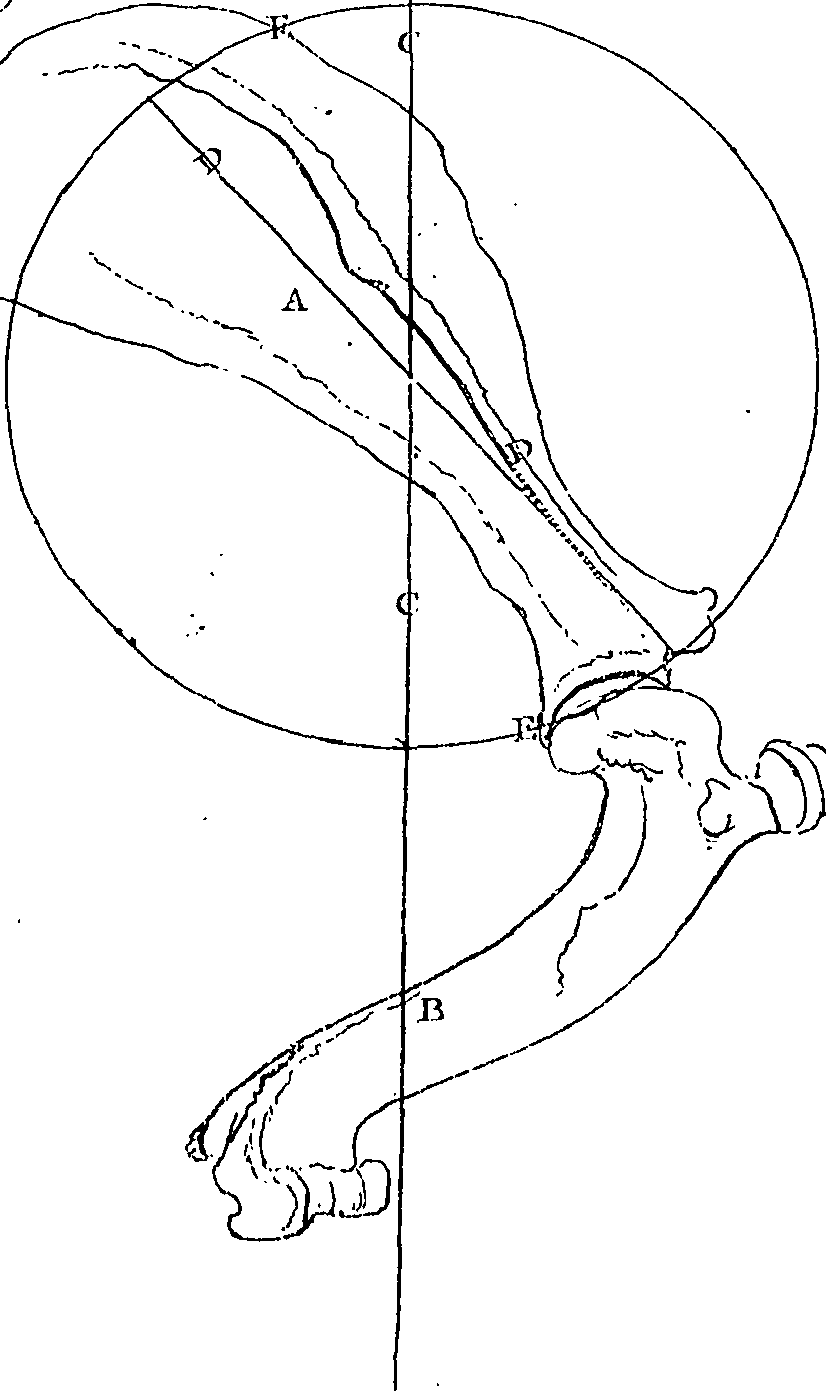

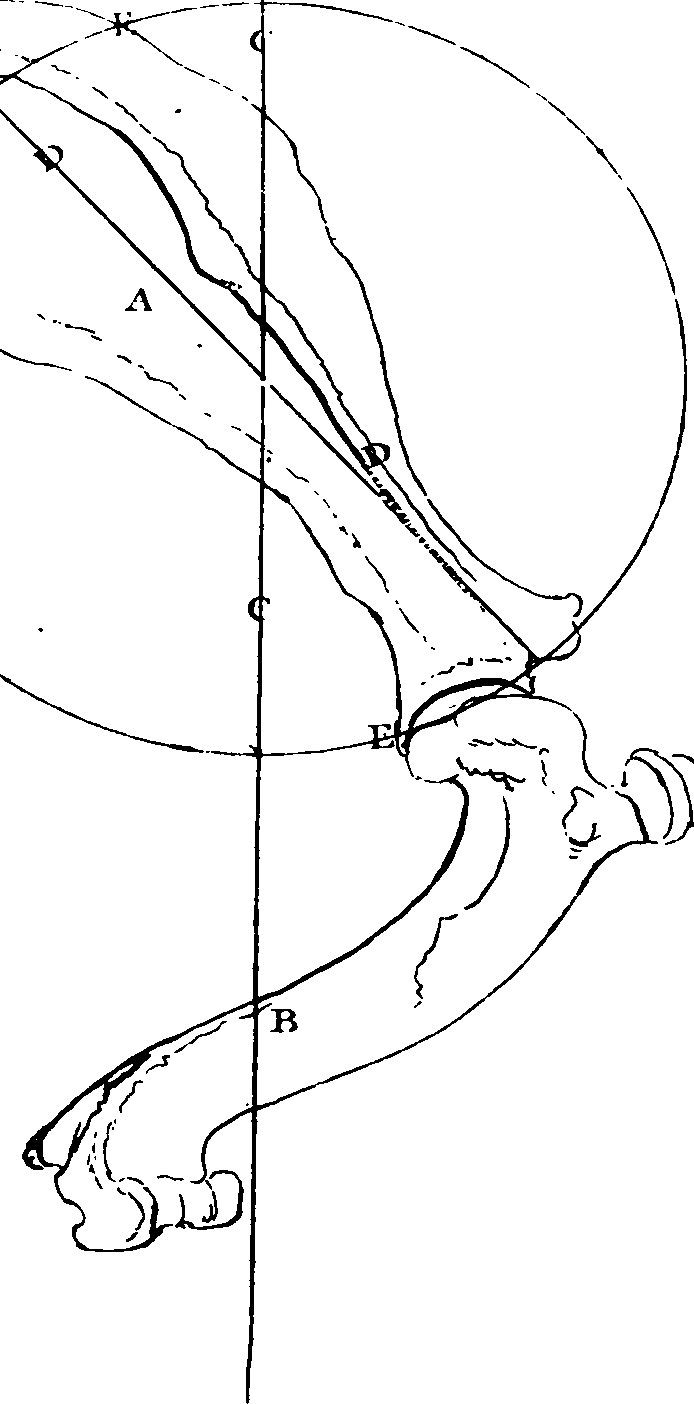

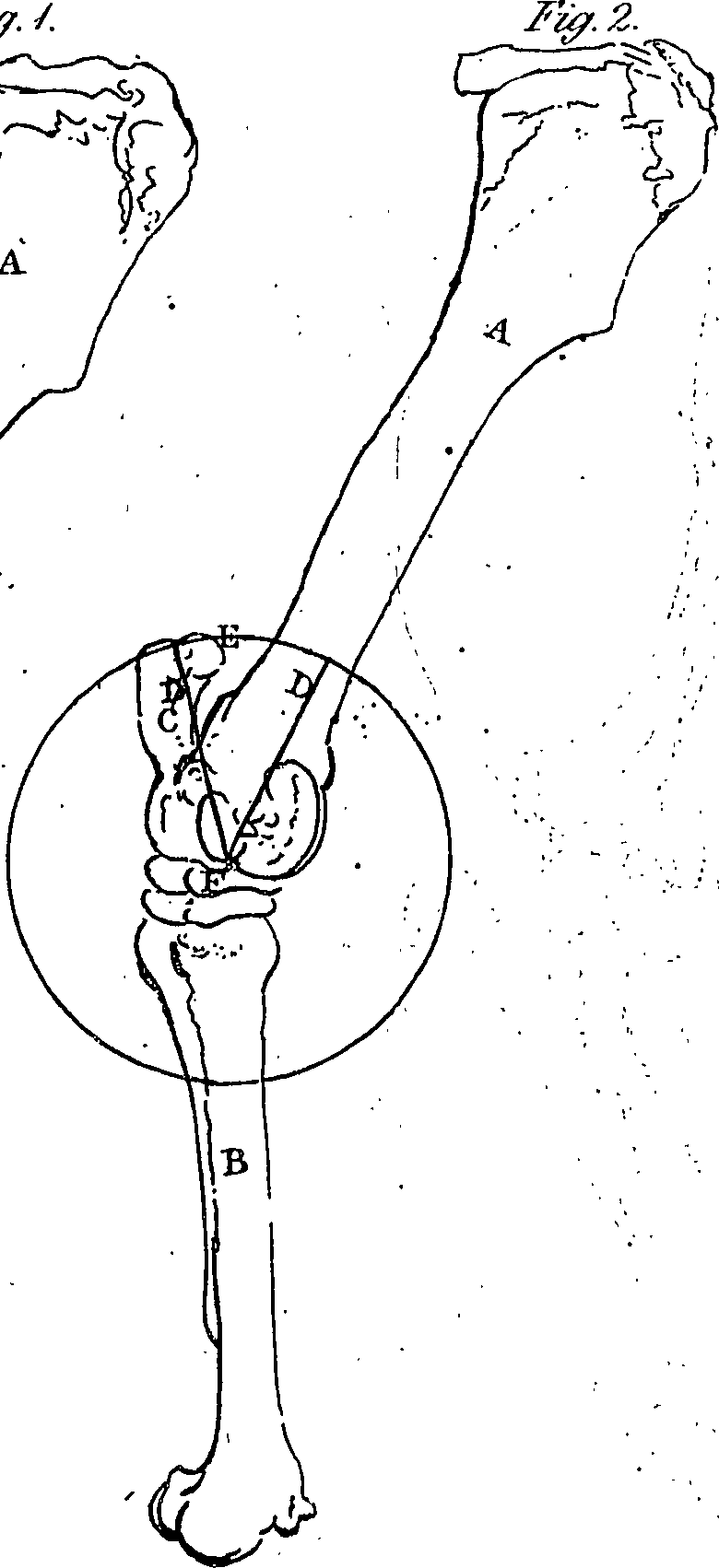

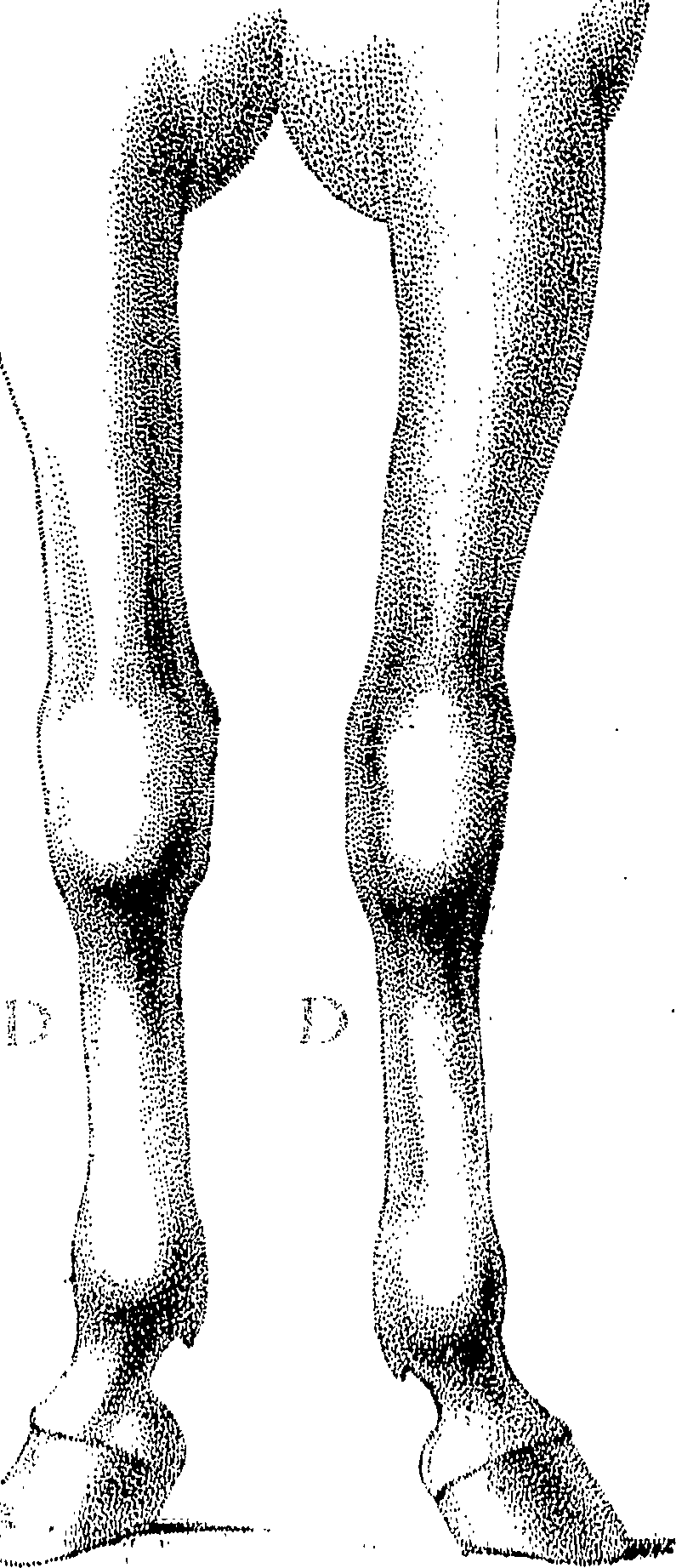

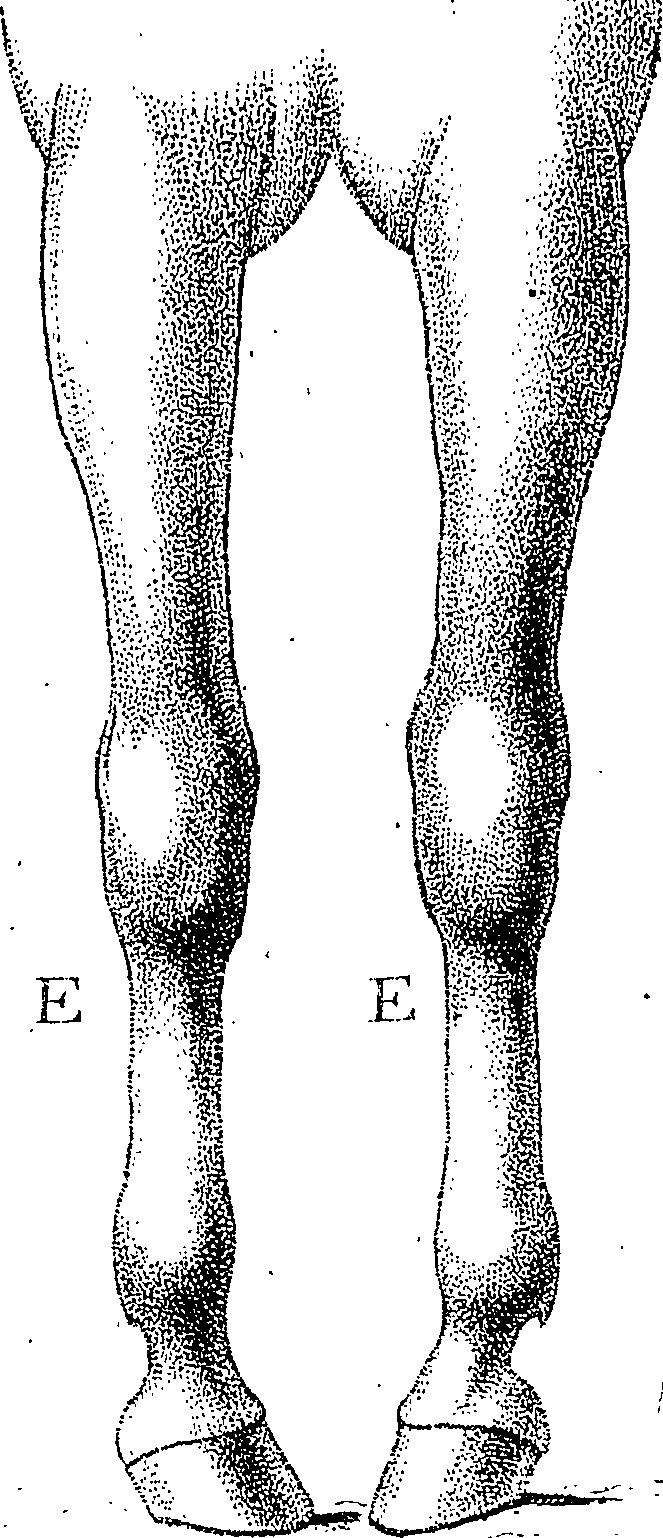

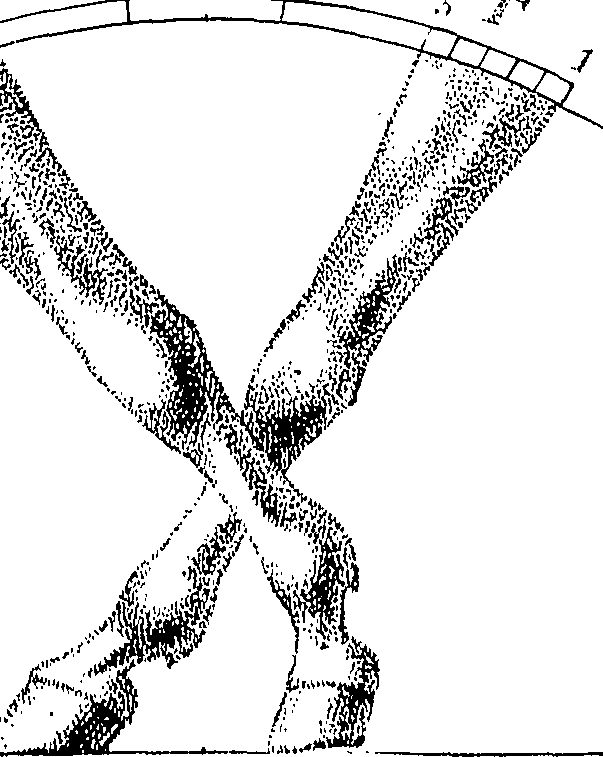

== Sources ==
- Power, D'A.; Warden, Linda (2005). "Vial de Sainbel [St Bel], Charles Benoît [formerly Benoît Vial] (1750–1793), veterinary surgeon". Oxford Dictionary of National Biography (online ed.). Oxford University Press. doi:10.1093/ref:odnb/24473. (Subscription, Wikipedia Library access or UK public library membership required.)
- The Works of Charles Vial de Sainbel … To Which Is Prefixed a Short Account of His Life. London: Martin and Bain, 1795.
- "Charles Vial de St. Bel's Plan". RCVS Knowledge. Retrieved 10 September 2022.

Attribution:

- This article incorporates text from a publication now in the public domain: Power, D'Arcy (1897). "Sainbel, Charles Vial de". In Lee, Sidney (ed.). Dictionary of National Biography. Vol. 50. London: Smith, Elder & Co. pp. 116–117.
