= Hamda Saïed =

Tunisian religious figure and politician (1940–2025)

- حمدة سعيد

Mufti of the Republic of Tunisia
- In office 8 July 2013 – 12 January 2016
- President: Moncef Marzouki; Beji Caid Essebsi
- Preceded by: Othman Battikh
- Succeeded by: Othman Battikh

Member of the Chamber of Deputies of Tunisia
- In office 9 April 1989 – 9 April 1994

Personal details
- Born: 10 June 1940 Béni Khiar, French protectorate of Tunisia
- Died: 2 October 2025 (aged 85)
- Political party: RCD (until 2011); Independent (2011–2025)
- Occupation: Mufti

Hamda Saïed (Arabic: حمدة سعيد; 10 June 1940 – 2 October 2025) was a Tunisian mufti and politician of the Democratic Constitutional Rally (RCD).

== Life and career ==
Born in Béni Khiar on 10 June 1940, Saïed earned a licentiate in Sharia law and theology and a doctorate in Islamic jurisprudence in 1987. In 1989, he was elected to the Chamber of Deputies. He became Imam of the mosque in Béni Khiar following the Tunisian revolution and became president of the Quranic association of Nabeul Governorate. On 6 July 2013, he was nominated to be Mufti of the Republic of Tunisia by President Moncef Marzouki, replacing Othman Battikh. He was replaced by Battikh on 12 January 2016.

Saïed died on 2 October 2025, at the age of 85.
