= Saied =

Saied or Saïed is both a given name and a surname. Notable people with the name include:

- Saied Reza Ameli (born 1961), Iranian academic
- Feras Saied (1981–2015), Syrian bodybuilder
- Hamda Saïed (1940–2025), Tunisian mufti and politician
- Kais Saied (born 1958), Tunisian politician, President (since 2019)
- Samir Saïed (born 1957), Tunisian businessman and cabinet minister
- Yamani Saied (born 1978), Panamanian model and beauty pageant winner

== Fictional characters ==
- Saied, a character better known as Manticore, member of the Onslaught from DC Comics

== See also ==
- Sa‘id
