= Jacqueline de Romilly =

French philologist, classical scholar and writer (1913–2010)

- Jacqueline de Romilly
- Born: 26 March 1913; Chartres, France
- Died: 18 December 2010 (aged 97); Boulogne-Billancourt, France
- Occupations: Writer; Professor
- Known for: Member of the Académie française

Academic background
- Education: Lycée Louis-le-Grand
- Alma mater: École Normale Supérieure; University of Paris

Academic work
- Doctoral students: Suzanne Saïd

Jacqueline Worms de Romilly (French: [ʁɔmiji]; née David; 26 March 1913 – 18 December 2010) was a French philologist, classical scholar and fiction writer. She was the first woman nominated to the Collège de France, and in 1988, the second woman to enter the Académie française.

She is primarily known for her work on the culture and language of ancient Greece, and in particular on Thucydides.

== Biography ==
Born in Chartres, Eure-et-Loir, she studied at the Lycée Molière. As a schoolgirl, she became the first female to qualify for a prize in the Concours général, taking the first prize in Latin to French translation and second prize in Ancient Greek in 1930. She then prepared for the École Normale Supérieure at the Lycée Louis-le-Grand. She entered the class of 1933 of the ENS Ulm. She passed the agrégation in Classics in 1936; however, because she was of Jewish ancestry, the Vichy government suspended her from her teaching duties during the Occupation of France. She became a doctor of letters at the University of Paris in 1947. Her doctoral thesis, a "masterful" treatment of Athenian imperialism in Thucydides, was published as Thucydide et l'impérialisme athénien, and subsequently translated into English as Thucydides and Athenian Imperialism.

After being a schoolteacher, she became a professor at Lille University and subsequently at the Sorbonne, between 1957 and 1973. She later was promoted to the chair of Greek and the development of moral and political thought at the Collège de France — the first woman nominated to this prestigious institution. In 1988, she was the second woman (after Marguerite Yourcenar) to enter the Académie française, being elected to Chair #7, which was previously occupied by André Roussin.

She published dozens of works on Greek philosophy, language and literature but her lifelong passion was Thucydides, the historian of the Peloponnesian War.

Outside academia she was best known to the French public for touring French schools and giving talks about the culture of ancient Greeks. She was a staunch defender of teaching of humanities in French schools, believing that an understanding of the classics was essential to understanding democracy, the liberty of the individual and the virtue of tolerance. In 1984 she published L’Enseignement en détresse, a book about declining standards in French schools. Her position in the Académie française enabled her to mount a defence of classical languages and literary culture, which she stated "may well be as endangered as the fauna of the oceans or the water of our rivers".

She was horrified by the 1988 vote to simplify aspects of the French language in primary schools and in 1992 she founded an Association for the Defence of Literary Studies.

In 1995, she obtained Greek nationality and in 2000 was named as an Ambassador of Hellenism by the Greek government. A one-time president of the Association Guillaume Budé, she remained an honorary president until her death at a hospital in Boulogne-Billancourt at the age of 97.

After having only received baptism in 1940, she fully converted to Maronite Catholicism in 2008, aged 95.

== Influence ==
De Romilly's two monographs on the ancient Greek historian Thucydides have been credited with "alter[ing] the landscape of Thucydidean scholarship" and "the beginning of a new era". In 2002, Danish classical scholar Anders Holm Rasmussen described her views on Thucydides' ideology of empire as still "one of the most important viewpoints" with which modern scholars can engage. Published first in 1956, her work Histoire et raison chez Thucydide is still in print in the original French today, and was translated into English as The Mind of Thucydides after her death. De Romilly believed that Thucydides's intelligent, reflective approach held lessons relevant to the Europe of today.

De Romilly also published outside the field of Greek historiography. In recent years, the value of her work Time in Greek Tragedy has been recognized by scholars working not only on Greek drama but also on Aristotle's metaphysics of time.

In 2016, Rosie Wyles and Edith Hall edited a volume called Women Classical Scholars: Unsealing the Fountain from the Renaissance to Jacqueline de Romilly, a history of pioneering women born between the Renaissance and 1913 who played significant roles in the history of classical scholarship.

== Honours and awards ==
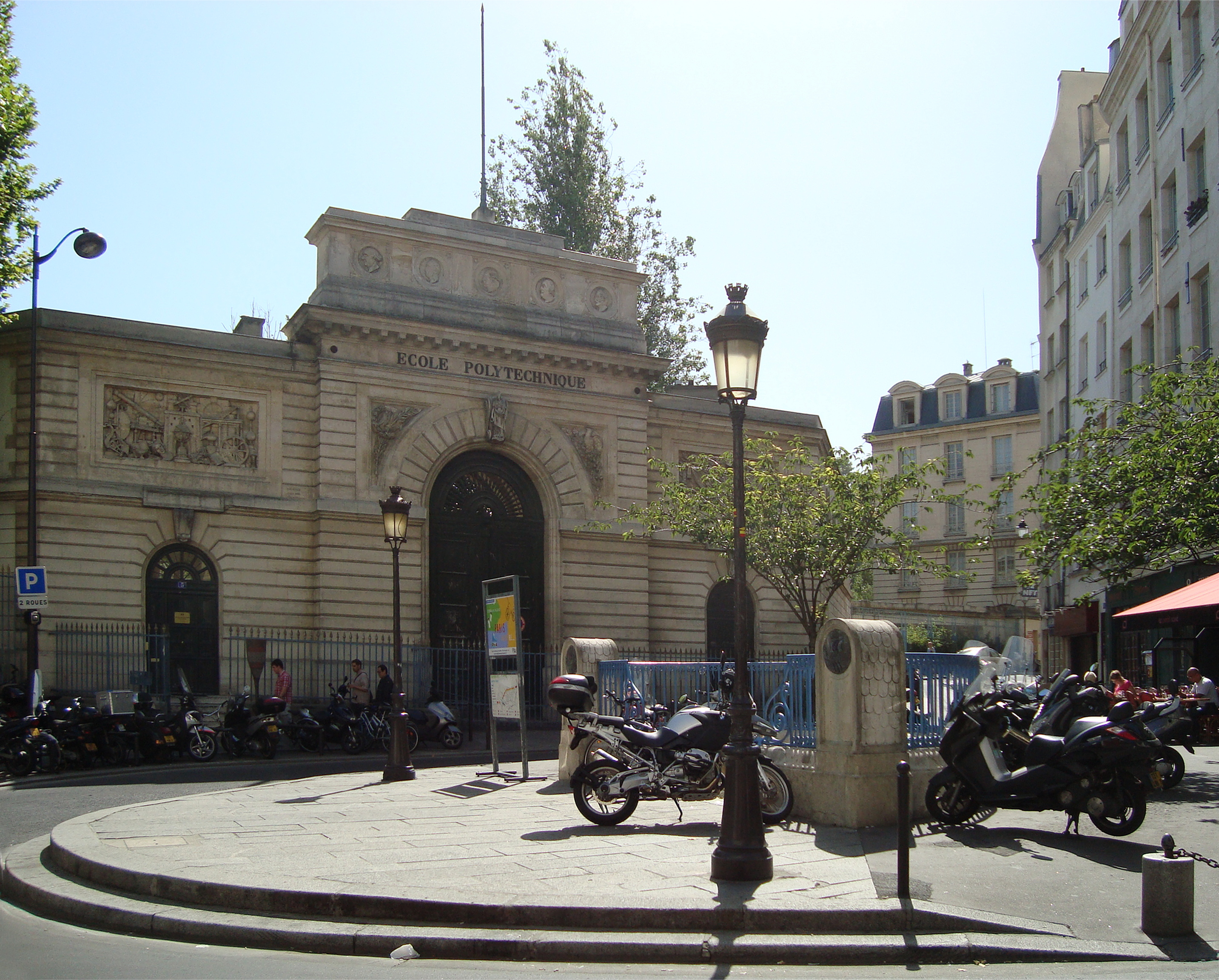
Jacqueline-de-Romilly Square, (Paris)

- Ambatielos Prize of the Académie des Inscriptions et Belles-Lettres (1948)
- Croiset Prize of the Institut de France (1969)
- Langlois Prize of the Académie française (1974)
- First woman member of the Académie des Inscriptions et Belles-Lettres (1975)
- Elected member of the American Philosophical Society (1978)
- Austrian Decoration for Science and Art (1981)
- Grand Prize of the Académie française (1984)
- President of the Academy of Inscriptions and Belles-Lettres (1987)
- Elected to the Académie française (24 November 24, 1988)
- Elected member of the American Academy of Arts and Sciences (1988)
- Foreign Honorary Member of the American Academy of Arts and Sciences (1988)
- Onassis Prize (Athens, 1995) - prize for her struggle to preserve teaching of ancient Greek and Latin.
- Appointed by Greece as Ambassador of Hellenism (2000) (she had received citizenship in 1995)
- Daudet Prize for defence of the French language (2000)
- Grand Cross of the Legion of Honour (2007)
- Prize of the Greek Parliament (2008)
- Grand Cross of the Ordre national du Mérite
- Commander of the Ordre des Palmes Académiques
- Commander of the Ordre des Arts et des Lettres
- Commander of the Order of the Phoenix (Greece)
- Commander of the Order of Honour (Greece)
- First woman professor at the Collège de France (Chair: Greece and the formation of the moral and political thought)
- Corresponding member of foreign academies: Denmark, Great Britain, Vienna, Athens, Bavaria, the Netherlands, Naples, Turin, Genoa and the United States.
- Honorary doctorates from the universities of Oxford, Athens, Dublin, Heidelberg, Montreal and Yale University

== Personal life ==
De Romilly's father, a philosophy professor, was killed in action in the First World War when De Romilly was only one year old. Her mother was a novelist who published under the name Jeanne Maxime-David.

In 1940 she married Michel de Romilly, a marriage that ended in divorce in the 1970s.

== Works published in English translation ==
De Romilly's work was largely published in French, but some of her works were written in or translated into English:

Books

- Thucydides and Athenian Imperialism, translated by P. Thody. Oxford, 1963.
- Time in Greek Tragedy (Messenger Lectures). Cornell, 1968.
- Magic and Rhetoric in Ancient Greece (Carl Newell Jackson Lectures). Cambridge, MA, 1975.
- The Rise and Fall of States According to Greek Authors (Thomas Spencer Jerome Lectures). Ann Arbor, 1977.
- A Short History of Greek Literature, translated by L. Doherty. Chicago, 1985.
- The Great Sophists in Periclean Athens, translated by J. Lloyd. Oxford, 1991.
- The Mind of Thucydides, translated by E. T. Rawlings. Cornell, 2012.
- The Life of Alcibiades: Dangerous Ambition and the Betrayal of Athens, translated by Elizabeth Trapnell Rawlings. Cornell, 2019.

Articles

- "Thucydides and the Cities of the Athenian Empire", in BICS 13 (1966) 1–12.
- "Phoenician Women of Euripides: Topicality in Greek Tragedy", translated by D. H. Orrok, in Bucknell Review 15 (1967) 108–132.
- "Fairness and Kindness in Thucydides", in Phoenix 28 (1974) 95–100.
- "Plato and Conjuring", in K. V. Erickson (ed.), Plato: True and Sophistic Rhetoric. Amsterdam, 1979.
- "Agamemnon in Doubt and Hesitation", in P. Pucci (ed.), Language and the Tragic Hero: Essays on Greek Tragedy in Honor of Gordon M. Kirkwood, 25–37. Atlanta, 1988.
- "Isocrates and Europe", in Greece & Rome 39 (1992) 2–13.
