= Essaïd =

Essaïd (Arabic: السعيد) is an Arabic male given name or surname. People with the name include:

- Essaïd Abelouache (born 1988), Moroccan racing cyclist
- Essaïd Belkalem (born 1989), Algerian football (soccer) player
- Mustapha Essaïd (born 1970), Moroccan-born French runner

== See also ==
- Sa‘id, a male Arabic given name
