= Saidi (name) =

Saidi is a surname. It is reported in a 2010 study that Saidi is one of the four most common surnames in Morocco. It is also used as a masculine given name. Notable people with the name include:

== Surname ==
- Abbes Saidi (born 1983), Tunisian Paralympian athlete
- Augustine Saidi (1929–1995), Tanzanian lawyer
- Farrokh Saidi (born 1929), Iranian surgeon and academician
- Hédi Saidi (1897–1948), Tunisian politician
- Jean Bamanisa Saïdi (born 1964), Congolese businessman and politician
- Kahina Saidi (born 1984), Algerian judoka
- Karim Saidi (born 1983), Tunisian football player
- Laid Saidi (born c. 1963), Algerian individual who was imprisoned by CIA
- Lyès Saïdi (born 1987), Algerian football player
- Nasser Saidi (born 1950), Lebanese politician and economist
- Nassim Saidi (born 1994), Algerian cyclist
- Redouane Saïdi (born 1971), Algerian handball player
- Ridha Saidi (born 1962), Tunisian politician
- Ridwan Saidi (1942–2022), Indonesian writer and politician
- Salaheddine Saidi (born 1987), Moroccan football player
- Thierry Saïdi (born 1965), French slalom canoeist
- William Saidi (1937–2017), Zimbabwean writer and journalist
- Zainelabidine Saïdi (born 1934), Tunisian educator

== Given name ==
- Saidi Berkat (c. 1563 – 1628), Sultan of Ternate
- Saidi Makula (born 1994), Tanzanian athlete
- Saidi Mtanda (born 1980), Tanzanian politician
- Saidi Ndemla (born 1996), Tanzanian football player
- Saidi Ndikumana (born 1986), Burundian football player
- Saidi Ntibazonkiza (born 1987), Burundian football player
- Saidi Shariff (1940–2020), Singaporean politician
- Saidi of Tidore (died 1657), Sultan of Tidore
