= Bensaïd =

Bensaïd, Bensaid, or Ben Saïd(Arabic: بنسعيد, Hebrew: בן סעיד) is a surname of North African origin meaning "son of Said" or "descendant of Said". Notable persons with that name include:

- Adlène Bensaïd (born 1981), Algerian footballer
- Bechir Ben Saïd (born 1992), Tunisian footballer
- Boualem Bensaïd (born 1967), Algerian terrorist
- Daniel Bensaïd (1946–2010), French Trotskyist and philosopher
- Jean Daniel Bensaid aka Jean Daniel (1920–2020), Algerian-French journalist and author
- Mohamed Mehdi Bensaid (born 1961), Moroccan politician
- Saïd Ben Saïd (born 1966), Tunisian-French film producer
- Samira Bensaïd (born 1960), Moroccan singer
