= Saida (name) =

- Pronunciation: [ˈsɑʕiːdɐ]
- Gender: Female

Origin
- Origin: Arabic

Saida, Saidah (Arabic: سَعِيدة saʽīdah) also spelled Sayda, Saeeda, or Sayeeda, is the female form of the Arabic male given name Sa‘id.

Saida is a Kurdish name means mother's sweetheart.

Saida is a Japanese surname but not related to the Arabic given name

== Arabic name ==
- Saida Agrebi, Tunisian politician
- Saida Charaf, Sahrawi Moroccan singer
- Saida Gunba, Soviet athlete
- Saida Karoli, Tanzanian singer
- Saida Miller Khalifa, British author
- Saida Muna Tasneem, a Bangladeshi diplomat
- Saida Sherif, a Pakistani-British broadcaster, educationalist, humanitarian and poet
- Sayeeda Warsi, Baroness Warsi, British lawyer and politician

== Japanese ==
- Haruko Saida, women's professional shogi player
- Satoshi Saida, Japanese pioneering wheelchair tennis player

== Other ==
- Saida, the name adopted by Dutch illustrator Henriette Willebeek le Mair later in life
