= Alexis Joseph Depaulis =

French sculptor and medallist

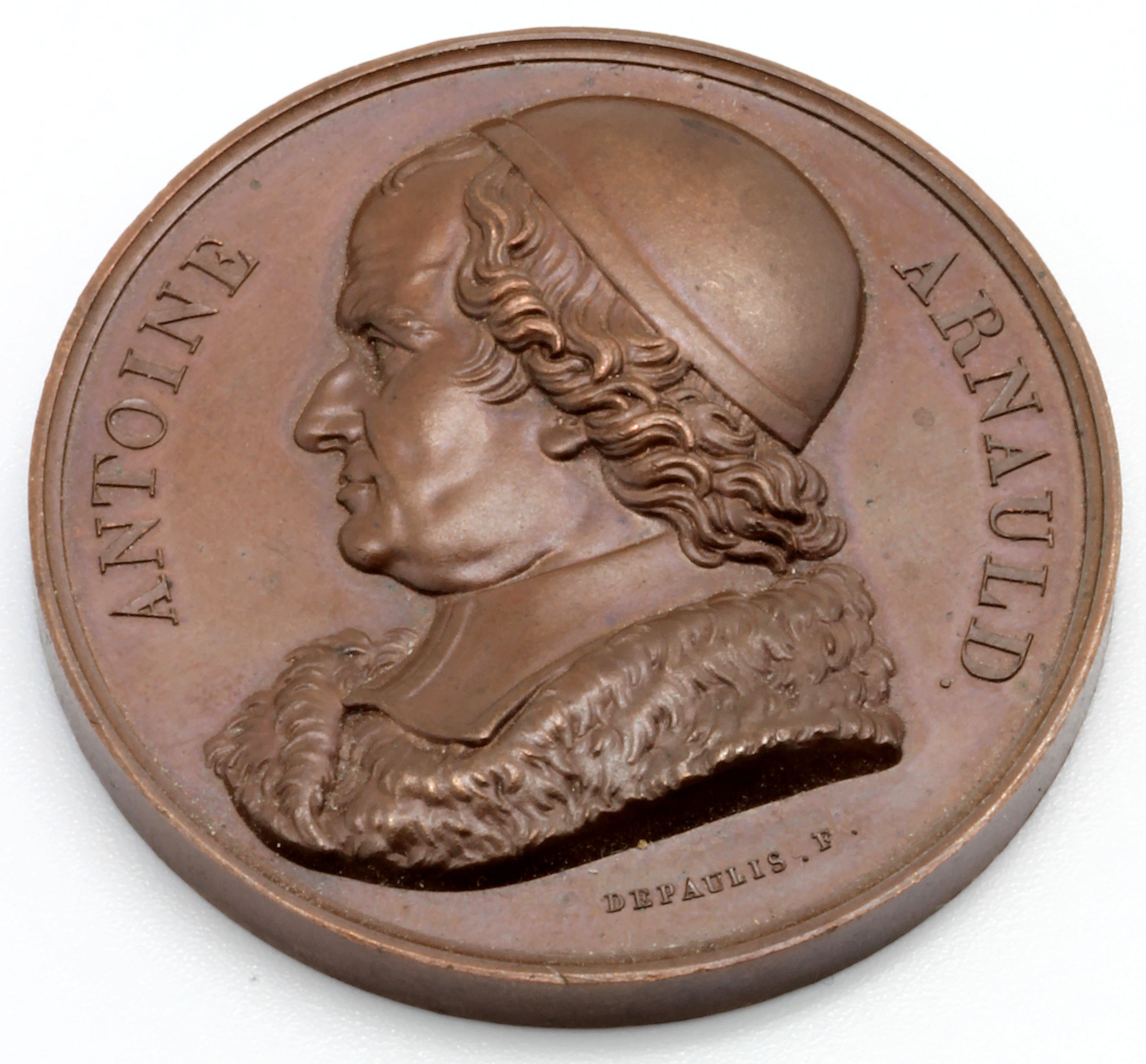
medallion depicting Antoine Arnauld by Alexis Joseph Depaulis, part of a series of commemorative medals called Gallery of Great Frenchmen, 1817

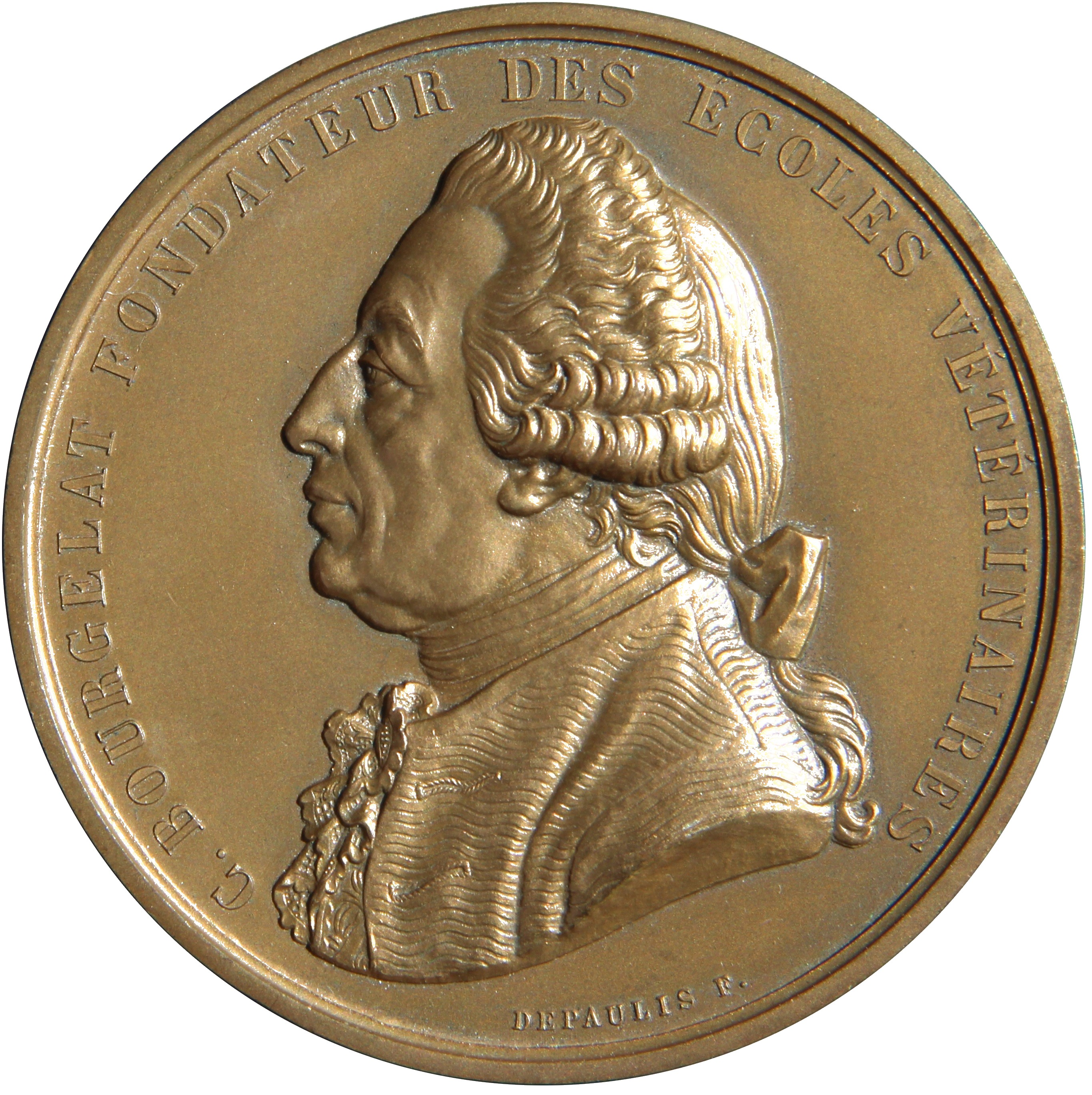
medallion depicting Claude Bourgelat by Alexis Joseph Depaulis

Alexis Joseph Depaulis (30 August 1792 – 15 September 1867) was a French sculptor and medallist.

Depaulis was born in Paris, and studied at the École nationale supérieure des Beaux-Arts under Bertrand Andrieu for medal making and Pierre Cartellier for sculpture. He frequently exhibited works at the school's salon from 1815 to 1855. A collection of his casts, medals and seals are preserved at the school, as well as in the Louvre. He typically signed his medals Depaulis F. Depaulis was appointed a Knight of the National Order of the Legion of Honor in 1834. He died in Paris on 15 September 1867.
