= Seydou Traoré (politician) =

Upper Voltan politician (born 1936)

Seydoux Traoré (born 1936) was an Upper Voltan veterinarian and politician.

Traoré was born in Sindou on February 18, 1936. He attended primary education in Sindou, and shifted to Bamako in 1950 to study at Lycée Terrasson-de-Fougères. He obtained a lower certificate in 1954. His grades were the highest of his class, and he was awarded a scholarship to study in metropolitan France. He studied at Lycée Alexandre-Ribot in Saint-Omer until 1956, when he obtained his first baccalaureat degree. Then he studied at Lycée du Parc 1957-1958 in preparations for entry exams for veterinary school. He studied at École nationale vétérinaire de Lyon 1958-1962. He attended a specialization course at the Institute on Breeding and Veterinary Medicine at the École nationale vétérinaire d'Alfort in 1963, preparing for his Doctorate in Veterinary Medicine. He obtained his Doctorate in 1964 at the Joint Faculty of Medicine and Pharmacy of Lyon. After the completion of his Doctorate, he returned to Upper Volta. Upon his return to Upper Volta he was appointed Head of the Animal Production Service in Bobo-Dioulasso in April 1964, a post he would hold for three years. On April 6, 1967, he was appointed Minister of Public Health, Population, and Social Affairs, serving until February 1971.

In May 1971, he became Director of the Cabinet of the President of the Republic, a key advisory role that he held until November 1975.

From November 1975 to May 1978, he served as Secretary-General of the Presidency of the Republic, contributing to national policy coordination and executive governance.

Regional roles

From May 1978 to February 1980, Dr. Traoré was appointed Director of the Agricultural Development Bureau (BCDA) of the West African Economic Community (CEAO), where he worked on advancing agricultural cooperation among West African nations.

He later became Director of Projects and Programs at the Permanent Interstate Committee for Drought Control in the Sahel (CILSS), focusing on regional strategies to combat desertification, enhance food security, and promote sustainable development in the Sahel region.

Honours

Seydoux Traoré received several national and international honors in recognition of his contributions to public service and regional development:

- Officer of the National Order of Burkina Faso
- Officer of the National Order of the Republic of Guinea
- Officer of the Legion of Honour (French Republic)
- Honorary Commander of the Most Serene Military Order of Saint Mary the Glorious (Principality of Monaco)

Death and legacy

Dr. Seydoux Traoré died on July 23, 1992, in Bobo-Dioulasso, where his professional and personal journey had begun.

He is remembered as a pioneering figure in veterinary science and public administration in Burkina Faso, and as a key contributor to regional development initiatives. His legacy endures in the institutions he helped shape and the policies he helped implement in the fields of health, agriculture, and regional cooperation.
