= Sexual jihad =

Alleged practice of jihadi women

Sexual jihad (Arabic: جهاد النكاح, romanized: jihad al-nikah) is the practice in which women sympathetic to jihadist extremism travel to war zones such as Syria and voluntarily offer themselves to be "married" to jihadist militants, often repeatedly, serving sexual comfort roles to help boost the fighters' morale.

Publicity first arose in 2013, and the veracity of the practice became the subject of a greater debate in September 2013 after the Interior Minister of Tunisia made a public statement describing it as a significant issue. Critics dismissed claims of "sexual jihad" as unfounded and political propaganda.

== Reports and allegations ==
The term originated from an alleged fatwa titled Jihad ul Nikaah and attributed to a Saudi Salafi cleric Sheikh Mohamad al-Arefe around 2013, that called for Iraqi women supporters to come forward for sex jihad and boost the mujaheddin fighting the government in Syria. Sheikh al-Arefe himself has denied allegations that he issued such a fatwa, dismissing it on his Twitter account as a "fabrication", and stressing that anyone who circulates or believes it is insane.

Other allegations of this practice stem from the Tunisian government propaganda in its war effort against Al Qaeda-linked terrorism in the mountainous Jebel ech Chambi region bordering Algeria. The Tunisian coalition government alleged in 2013 that the practice began with Tunisian girls sympathetic to the Islamic jihad movement there, and then spread with Tunisian girls volunteering comfort to Syrian jihadis. In April 2013, the Grand Mufti of Tunisia, Othman Battikh, claimed that Tunisian girls were visiting Syria to take part in a sexual jihad. In July 2013, President Moncef Marzouki replaced him as Mufti with Battikh alleging that he was replaced as punishment for speaking out.

In July 2013, on a Facebook page claiming to be connected to the Muslim Brotherhood, a commentator promoted "sexual jihad". The page has been deemed a "hoax," and a senior Muslim Brotherhood supporter called the page a "smear campaign".

On 19 September 2013, Lofti bin Jeddou, the Interior Minister of Tunisia, stated in the National Constituent Assembly that Tunisian women traveling to Syria for "sex jihad" were having sex with 20, 30 and even up to 100 rebels, and that some of the women had returned home pregnant. On 6 October 2013, a Tunisian official downplayed this prior claim, saying at most 15 Tunisian women traveled to Syria, though some were forced to have sex with several Islamist militants.

Tunisian TV station Nofal Al-Wartani televised an interview with an alleged Tunisian jihadist Abu Qusay who they said had returned from Syria, and who said that stories about "Jihad al-Nikah" are not just a rumor but are real, and that he himself had experienced it firsthand. He also spoke of the nationalities of the girls who travel to Syria to partake in it while also fighting as snipers during the day. He was arrested by Tunisian security services, which investigated and found out that he had never in fact been to Syria, and Al-Arabiya reported that his allegations were untrue.

According to the British tabloid the Daily Mirror, there were reports in 2014 that Islamic State in Iraq and the Levant (ISIL) fighters told families to "hand over [their] daughters for sex". It said that "leaflets in the captured cities of Mosul and Tikrit [in Iraq] claim the women—virgins or not—must join jihad (...) and cleanse themselves by sleeping with militants. Those that refuse to do so are violating God's will, it is claimed, and will be beaten or killed." The Malaysian Insider reported in August 2014 that Sunni women from Australia, the United Kingdom and Malaysia had voluntarily joined ISIL as comfort women. In June 2014, Egyptian daily newspaper Al-Masry Al-Youm mentioned that a Kuwaiti television show Kuwait wa al-Nas had reported that activists on social media were circulating reports about ISIL putting up posters calling on the people of Mosul to bring them their unmarried girls to participate in "marriage jihad". The statement was not independently verified by either Al-Masry Al-Youm or by Kuwait wa al-Nas.

In December 2014, the Iraqi Ministry of Human Rights announced that one member of ISIL had killed at least 150 females in Fallujah, including pregnant women, who refused to participate in what the Iraqi government called sexual jihad. No images have surfaced of the massacre, and no one has been able to independently verify it. France24 found that the photo which was used to illustrate the story was fake, originating in an unrelated Libyan context the previous year.

In August 2015, a Kurdistan Democratic Party spokesperson claimed that ISIL had executed 19 women who refused to participate in "sexual jihad".

== Skepticism ==
In September 2013, David Kenner in Foreign Policy Magazine wrote that there is no evidence for the allegations from the Tunisian government and others for the existence of "sex jihad". On 7 October 2013, the German magazine Der Spiegel reported that "sex jihad" to Syria was "an elaborate disinformation campaign by the Syrian government to distract international attention from its own crimes." Hilmi M. Zawati, an international criminal law and human rights jurist, argues that the fatwa was fabricated and widely disseminated by the Syrian government and its allies with the aim of tarnishing and stigmatizing the jihadist rebels among the conservative community in Syria.

Raymond Ibrahim of the Middle East Forum wrote an article for FrontPage Magazine republished as an opinion piece in Algemeiner Journal, which alleged that Foreign Policy Magazine and other western sources were deliberately covering up the true story of sex jihad, as many victims' cases have been reported in multiple media reports and several sex jihad volunteers have come forward to give interviews.

== See also ==
- Brides of the Islamic State
- Love jihad conspiracy theory
