= Othman Battikh =

Tunisian Islamic leader (1941–2022)

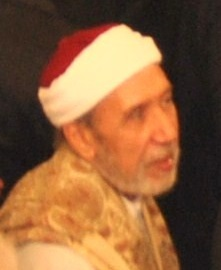
- Battikh in 2011

Grand Mufti of Tunisia

Personal details
- Born: 17 April 1941 French Protectorate of Tunisia, France
- Died: 25 October 2022 (aged 81) Tunisia
- Occupation: Islamic scholar

Othman Battikh (Arabic: عثمان بطَيخ; 17 April 1941 – 25 October 2022) was a Tunisian Islamic scholar and Grand Mufti of Tunisia from 2008 to 2013. He also served as member of the Tunisian government.

== Biography ==
Born into a modest Tunisian family, his father worked as a hairdresser. He studied at the Franco-Arab school and attended secondary school at the University of Ez-Zitouna spending the first two years attached to the Saheb Ettabaâ Mosque then the second two years at the Ibn Khaldoun school at Zitouna. He continued his studies at the l'École supérieure de droit de Tunis (School of Law of Tunis) under Mohamed Fadhel Ben Achour, Mohamed Malki, Mohamed Ben Slama and Mohamed Annabi. After his studies, he worked as a judge (magistrat au Tribunal de première instance) in Tunis for three years and then returned to Zitouna for four years to continue his studies focusing on Islamic law (fiqh) and comparative law with a specialty in the Code of Personal Status (Tunisia) which bans polygamy, emphasizes the equality of the sexes, and does not enforce the hijab.

In 2008, Battikh was appointed the Grand Mufti of Tunisia, the most senior Muslim religious position in the country, by President Zine El Abidine Ben Ali. In April 2013, he caused controversy in the media when he alleged that Tunisian girls were visiting Syria to take part in a sexual jihad, the phenomenon of giving sexual services to terrorists fighting in Syria under the name of religion. In July 2013, President Moncef Marzouki replaced him as Mufti with Saied Hamda; Battikh alleged that he was replaced as punishment for speaking out. On 2 February 2015, he was appointed Minister of Religious Affairs in the government of Prime Minister Habib Essid.

On 5 January 2016, an enquiry was opened at the Tribunal of First Instance of Tunis in relation to financial overspends which the minister was said to have carried out at the time of his last pilgrimage to Mecca. On the next day, he was replaced by Mohamed Khalil at the head of the Ministry of Religious Affairs. On 12 January, he was re-appointed Mufti of the Republic by President Béji Caïd Essebsi.

Battikh was seen as a moderate and was critical of Salafi and Wahabi doctrine.

== See also ==
- Islam in Tunisia
- Religion in Tunisia
