= Béni Khiar =

Coordinates: 36°28′N 10°47′E

Béni Khiar بني خيار
- Commune and town
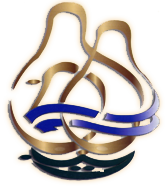
- Coat of arms
- Interactive map of Béni Khiar
- Country: Tunisia
- Governorate: Nabeul Governorate

Population (2022)
  - Total: 30,036
- Time zone: UTC+1 (CET)

Béni Khiar is a town and commune in the Nabeul Governorate, Tunisia. As of 2004 it had a population of 16,992.It is known for its beach, pleasant weather, especially in the summer, and tourists from within the country and from Algeria.

== Culture ==
Béni Khiar organizes an annual festival of orange blossoms in March, a beach party in July, and a fish festival in August. A festival of liturgical music (sufyet) also takes place during the first half of the month of Ramadan. Béni Khiar is home to one of the oldest groups of Sufi religious music (Aissaouia al-Morabet) in Tunisia.

== See also ==
- List of cities in Tunisia
