= Veterinary education in France =

Veterinary education in France is ensured by four specialised grandes écoles, the veterinary schools, located in Lyon, Maisons-Alfort, Nantes and Toulouse. The studies last at least seven years after the baccalauréat and end with an exertion thesis giving the right to the state diploma of veterinary physician.

The course starts with two years of scientific studies at the end of which students spend a national contest to enter into a veterinary school, where studies will then continue over five years.

France was the first country where the teaching of veterinary medicine has become institutionalized, through the establishment of the first veterinary schools in the eighteenth century.

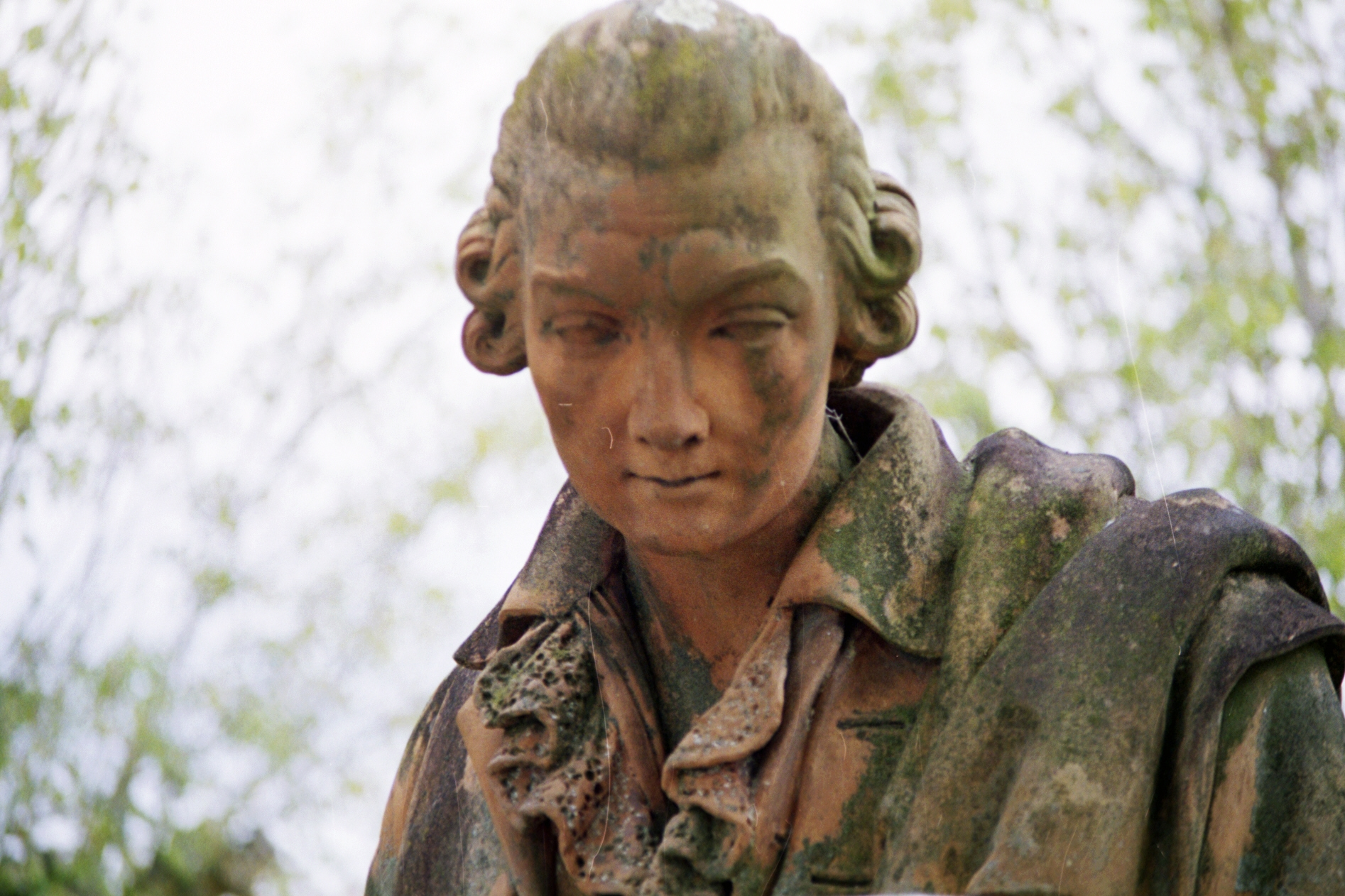
Claude Bourgelat, pioneer of veterinary education

== Veterinary Doctorate State Diploma (Diplôme d'Etat de docteur vétérinaire (DEV)) education ==
=== Preliminary studies and preparation ===
The entry into a veterinary school is possible via a nationwide contest accessible after two years of preliminary undergraduate scientific studies, which number of places is about 550 per year (the exact number is set each year by the French ministry of Agriculture). The contest is organized by the department of agronomic and veterinary contests.

The number of attempts to the contest is limited to two per person, across all entryways.

There are five possible contests after which admitted students formulate their integration vows in the four schools by order of preference, places are then filled by order of merit.

==== Preparatory class BCPST ====
This classe préparatoire aux grands écoles, BCPST pathway (standing for biology, chemistry, physics and earth science), is open to students with a scientific baccalauréat, and allows to attempt the A BCPST contest. This preparation is accessible after a selection based on application which take into account the school reports of the two last years of high school.

These two years of preparatory class are not specific to the education of veterinarians, indeed they also allows to attempt other contests to enter into agri-food, horticulture, geology, chemistry, and physics engineering schools, as well as into the écoles normales supérieures (in biology and geology pathways). All students therefore receive extensive training in various fields, which may not be directly related to veterinary medicine, such as plant biology, physics, chemistry, geology, and mathematics.

=== Studies in the veterinary schools ===
In France, there are four veterinary schools:

- Oniris Nantes
- The National Veterinary School of Alfort
- The National Veterinary School of Toulouse
- École nationale vétérinaire de Lyon (VetAgro Sup Lyon)

All these are public institutions under supervision of the ministry of Agriculture.

The only existing classification of these schools is given indirectly by the rank of the last called at the end of the entrance examination. This ranking reflects only the popularity of schools among students passing the examination, it may be consistent with reality or not. Schools of Lyon and Alfort are thus often the two schools that enjoy greater prestige among these students. This prestige can be explained by the age of these schools which were founded in the eighteenth century, as opposed to schools of Toulouse and Nantes, newer and therefore that have less impregnated collective imagination.

The duration of studies in veterinary school is 5 years.

==== Core curriculum ====
Basic training lasts 4 years divided into 8 semesters. The first 3 years are rather theoretical, the fourth year is more clinical. This common core ends with the veterinary fundamental studies degree (DEFV), a diploma giving the master's degree.

During the first 3 years, future veterinarians study numerous subjects. Among them there are disciplines describing the state and the normal functioning of the body, such as anatomy, histology, physiology and immunology; disciplines describing pathogens, such as bacteriology, virology, parasitology and mycology; disciplines dealing with pathological functioning of the body, such as pathology and pathophysiology; disciplines for understanding the mechanisms and characteristics of diseases, such as infectiology and pathology; practical disciplines, such as propaedeutic and surgery; disciplines focused on diagnostic support and treatment, such as medical imaging, clinical biology and pharmacology; as well as disciplines on particular apparatus such as ophthalmology, dermatology, rheumatology and theriogenology (gynecology and obstetrics).

Secondary disciplines are also studied, but this can vary from one school to another. These disciplines include: food science, genetics, statistics, analytical chemistry (mass spectrometry, IR, NMR), health biotechnology, ethnology (domestication, breeds), scientific ecology, veterinary legislation, management, housing livestock, quality and safety of food, hog, poultry, fish and rabbit production, English, and sometimes other modern languages.

During the fourth year, students perform clinical rotations in different departments of the Veterinary Teaching Hospital at their school.

==== In-depth study ====
The fifth year is a year of deepening that allows students to learn more about a particular subject. This deepening year should not be confused with a specialization, which comes after the seven years of study leading to the Veterinary Doctorate State Diploma (Diplôme d'Etat de docteur vétérinaire (DEV)). There are deepening in clinical pathways and in non-clinical pathways.

== History ==
=== Eighteenth century ===
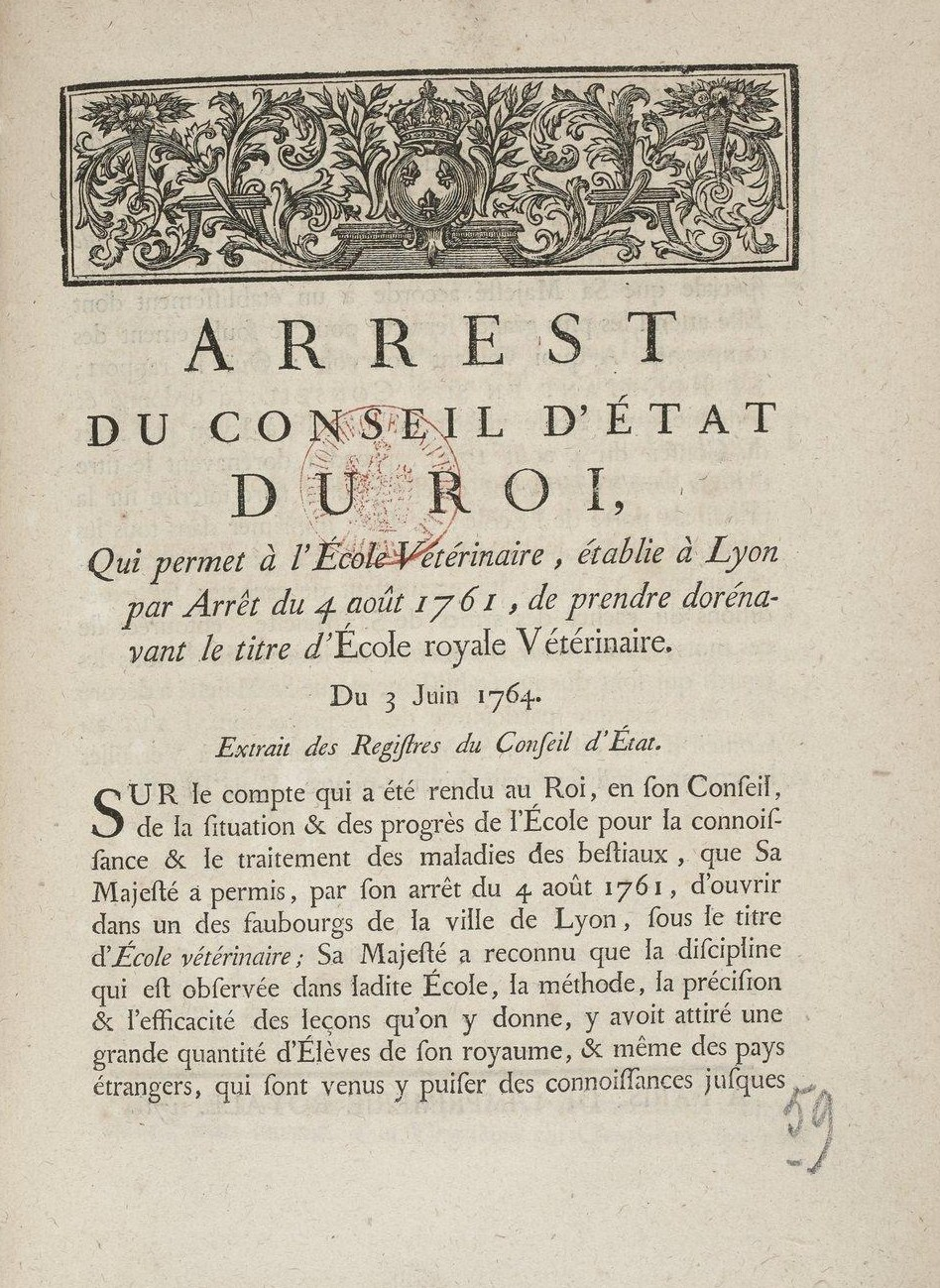
King Council decision that allows the Veterinary School of Lyon to take the title of Royal Veterinary School

Claude Bourgelat is considered the founder of scientific veterinary medicine in France and around the world. By his willingness to provide instruction to blacksmiths, who were until then the only people to treat diseases of domestic animals, he was at the origin of the training of veterinarians in France.
