= William Saidi =

Zimbabwean writer and journalist

William Sylvester Saidi (8 May 1937 – 4 January 2017) was a Zimbabwean writer and journalist. Among his friends and family he was commonly known as 'Bill' Saidi. He died in Kitwe, Zambia after a long illness.

== Early life ==
Saidi was born at St David's Mission in Chihota Tribal Trust Lands, south of Harare. He grew up in the township of Mbare, where he attended school, and developed a passion for jazz and journalism. He was the only son of Evelyn Chidzetse of Makawe village in Seke district, and an immigrant father Agonilepi Matola Saidi from Malawi. He married twice, and divorced twice but each marriage produced three children. Saidi was survived by his six children, and 15 grandchildren.

== Career ==
He began his journalism career in 1957 when he was 20 years old when he joined the African Daily News. Eventually, he practiced his journalism in the twin countries of Zambia and Zimbabwe, where he is regarded in equal esteem for his contributions. Saidi moved to Zambia when it achieved independence in 1964 and only returned to Zimbabwe at independence in 1980. He first worked in the public media as editor. Subsequently, he co-founded The Daily News, in 1999 with Geoffrey Nyarota and Davison Maruziva. The paper was so critical of the Robert Mugabe regime that its printing press was bombed, and its editors routinely arrested.

=== Creative writer ===
Apart from journalism, Saidi, was an award winning fiction writer. He published the following books, which included novels and a late autobiography:

-The Hanging (National Educational Company of Zambia, 1978)

-Return of the Innocent (National Educational Company of Zambia, 1979)

-The Old Bricks Lives (Mambo Press, 1988)

-Gwebede's Wars (College Press, 1989)

-Day of the Baboons (Zambia Educational Publishing House, 1991)

-The Brother's of Chatima Street (College Press, 1992)

-Who is Who in Zimbabwe (Roblaw Publishers, 1992)

-A Sort of Life in Journalism (MISA-Zimbabwe, 2011)
