= Mohamed Seydou Dera =

Ivorian footballer (born 1986)

Mohamed Dera
Personal information
- Full name: Mohamed Seydou Dera
- Date of birth: 9 April 1986 (age 40)
- Place of birth: Ivory Coast
- Position: Midfielder

Youth career
- AS Cocody

Senior career*
Years	Team	Apps	(Gls)
2007	US Monastir	30	(11)
2008	Savit Mogilev	15	(0)
2008	Lokomotiv Minsk	8	(4)
2009–2010	Neman Grodno	35	(0)
2010–2011	RCK Ouagadougou		

International career
- Côte d'Ivoire U-20
- * Club domestic league appearances and goals

Mohamed Seydou Dera (born 9 April 1986) is a Côte d'Ivoire former footballer.

== Career ==
Sera started his career with AS Cocody and was 2006 promoted to the seniorside of the club, who played this time in the Division 3. In the following season signed in February 2007 for Tunesian side US Monastir. In Winter 2007 signed for Belarusian side FC Savit Mogilev and a half year later with Lokomotiv Minsk. He played 8 games and scored four goals in the second half of the 2008 Belarusian Season and moved in January 2009 to Neman Grodno. In August 2010 signed in Burkina Faso for Rail Club du Kadiogo.

=== International ===
He was member for Côte d'Ivoire under-20 national team, before earned the first call-up for the Burkina Faso national football team 2010.
