= Sait Idrizi =

Slovenian footballer (born 1990)

Personal information
- Full name: Sait Idrizi
- Date of birth: 26 April 1990 (age 36)
- Place of birth: SFR Yugoslavia
- Height: 1.75 m (5 ft 9 in)
- Position: Attacking midfielder

Youth career
- Svoboda Ljubljana
- 2008–2009: Olimpija Ljubljana

Senior career*
Years	Team	Apps	(Gls)
2007–2008	Svoboda Ljubljana	1	(1)
2008–2010	Olimpija Ljubljana	10	(0)
2009	→ Jezero Medvode (loan)	5	(1)
2011	Nafta Lendava	7	(0)
- * Club domestic league appearances and goals as of 8 April 2023 (UTC)

Sait Idrizi (born 26 April 1990) is a Slovenian retired football midfielder.

== Honours ==
- Slovenian Second League: 2008–09
