= École nationale vétérinaire de Lyon =

Veterinary School in Lyon, France

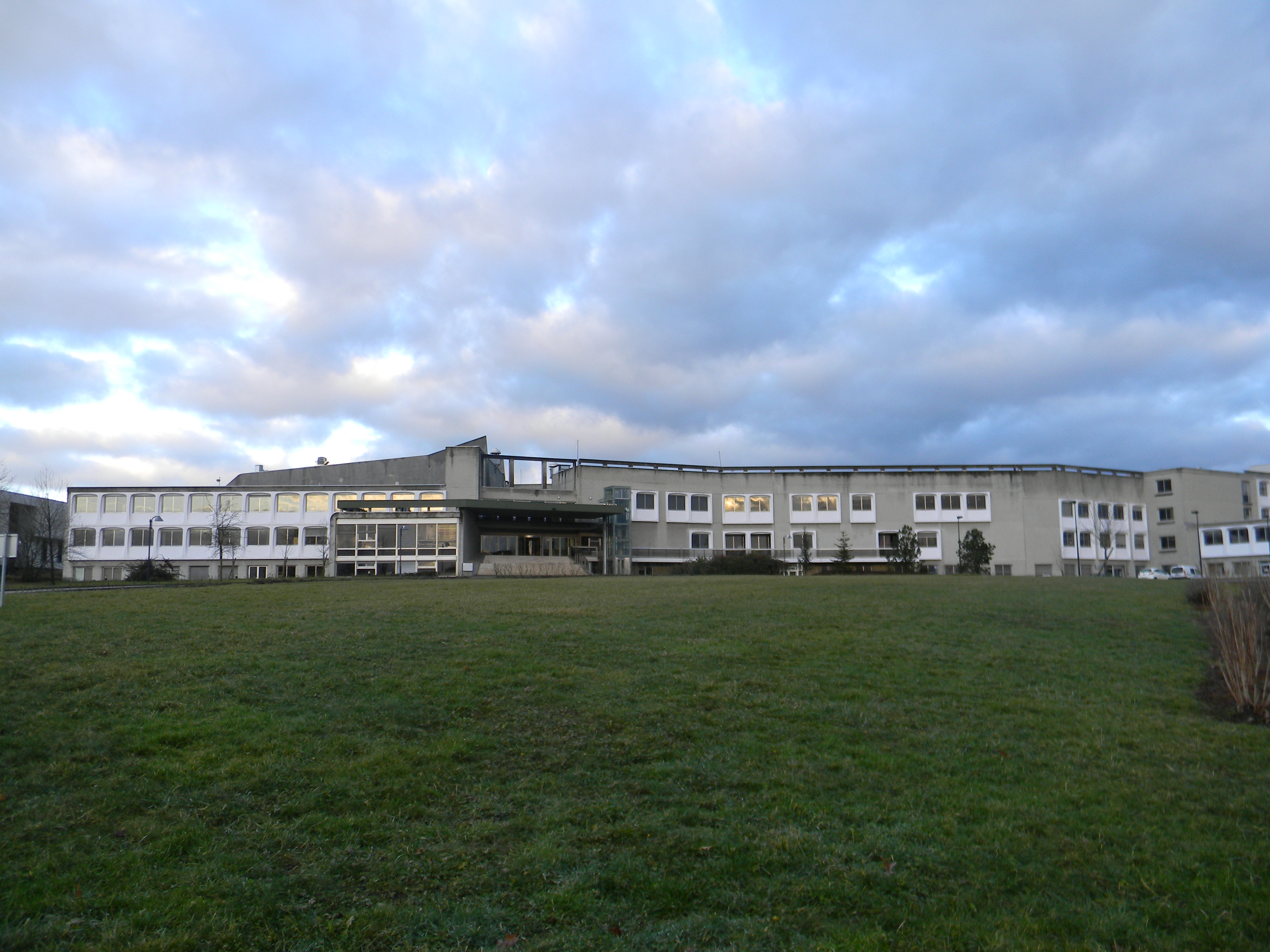
The campus of the school in Marcy-l'Étoile, Lyon.

The National Veterinary School of Lyon (French: École nationale vétérinaire de Lyon or ENVL) is a French public institution of scientific research and higher education in veterinary medicine, located in Lyon. It is operated under the supervision of the ministry of Agriculture. It is a division of VetAgro Sup.

The school was established in 1761 by Claude Bourgelat and was the world's first veterinary school.

This is one of the four schools providing veterinary education in France.

See detailed article Veterinary education in France

== See also ==
- List of schools of veterinary medicine
