= Suat =

Suat is a unisex Turkish given name. The name is the Turkish written form of the Arabic given name Suad.

People named Suat include:

- Suat Aşani (1916–1970), Turkish Olympic fencer
- Suat Atalık (born 1964), Turkish chess player
- Suat Derviş (1904 or 1905–1972), Turkish female novelist, journalist, and political activist
- Suat Günsel (born 1952), Turkish Cypriot entrepreneur, businessman and founder of the Near East University
- Suat Kaya (born 1967), Turkish footballer
- Suat Kılıç (born 1972), Turkish lawyer, journalist, and politician
- Suat Kınıklıoğlu (born 1965), Turkish politician, writer and analyst
- Suat Mamat (1930–2016), Turkish footballer
- Suat Okyar (born 1972), Turkish football coach and former footballer
- Suat Serdar (born 1997), German footballer of Turkish descent
- Suat Suna (born 1975), Turkish pop singer and composer
- Suat Türker (1970-2023), Turkish-German football player
- Suat Hayri Ürgüplü (1903–1981), Turkish politician and former prime minister
- Suat Usta (born 1981), Turkish footballer
- Suat Yalaz (1932-2020), Turkish comic book artist
