= Suzanne Saïd =

French classical scholar (1939–2024)

- Born: 2 September 1939; Algiers, French Algeria
- Died: 1 October 2024 (aged 85); Paris, France

Academic work
- Discipline: Classics
- Sub-discipline: Ancient Greek literature

Suzanne Saïd (2 September 1939 – 1 October 2024) was a French classical scholar, known above all for her work on Homer and Greek tragedy.

== Biography ==
Saïd was born in Algiers, French Algeria, on 2 September 1939.

She obtained a doctorate (doctorat de 3ème cycle) under the supervision of Jacqueline de Romilly. Her thesis, on the subject of the sense of the word hamartia (error) in Greek tragedy, was favourably received by the examining jury, which included Pierre Chantraine. Saïd's first book, La faute tragique (1978), was on the same topic, but only loosely related to her thesis.

After serving as an assistante and maître-assistante at Paris-Sorbonne University, she held professorships at the University of Grenoble, the University of Strasbourg and Paris Nanterre University. She then moved to the United States, becoming a professor at Columbia University from 1990 until 2010.

In 2014, she was honoured with a Festschrift, titled Éclats de littérature grecque d'Homère à Pascal Quignard: mélanges offerts à Suzanne Saïd, the contributions to which were written by students who had studied under her direction.

She died in Paris on 1 October 2024. On 3 July 2025, a colloquium was held in her memory at Paris Nanterre University, followed by the inauguration of the Suzanne Saïd fund at the library for archaeology and the study of antiquity (bibliothèque d’archéologie et des sciences de l'Antiquité) at the university.

== Selected publications ==
- Saïd, Suzanne (1978). La faute tragique. Maspero. ISBN 9782348033599.
- Saïd, Suzanne (1985). Sophiste et tyran ou le problème du Prométhée enchaîné. Klincksieck. ISBN 9782865630486.
- Saïd, Suzanne; Tredé, Monique (1999). A Short History of Greek Literature. Routledge. ISBN 9781134806539.
- Saïd, Suzanne (2008). Approches de la mythologie grecque: lectures anciennes et modernes. Les Belles Lettres. ISBN 9782251443515.
- Saïd, Suzanne (2011). Homer and the Odyssey. Oxford University Press. ISBN 9780199542857.
- Saïd, Suzanne (2013). Le Monde à l'envers: pouvoir féminin et communauté des femmes en Grèce ancienne. Les Belles Lettres. ISBN 9782251444734.
