= Claude Bourgelat =

French veterinary surgeon (1712–1779)

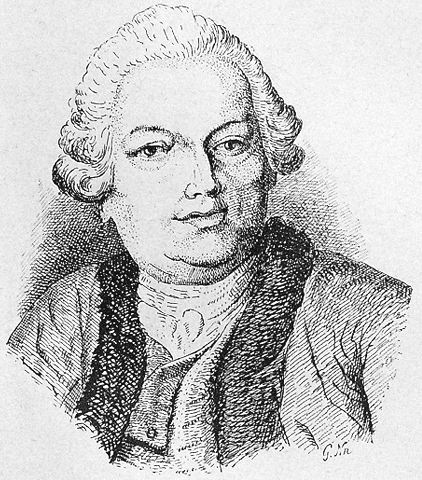
- Born: 27 March 1712; Lyon, France
- Died: 3 January 1779 (aged 66); Paris
- Known for: Scientifically informed veterinary medicine
- Awards: French Academy of Sciences, Prussian Academy of Sciences
- Scientific career
- Fields: Veterinary medicine
- Workplaces: Lyon Academy of Horsemanship, veterinary colleges at Lyon (founder)

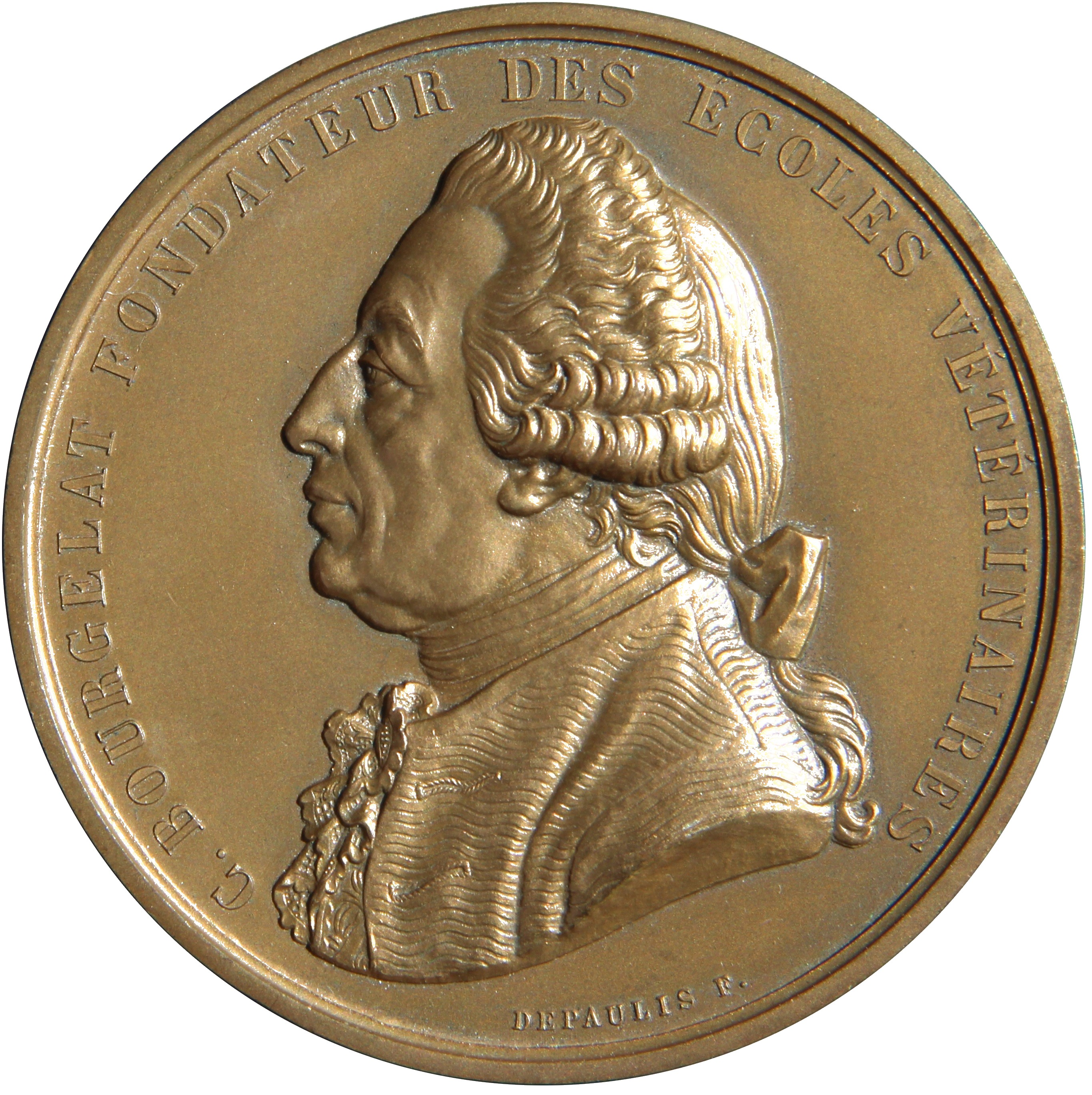
Medal bearing the image of Claude Bourgelat by Alexis Joseph Depaulis

Claude Bourgelat (27 March 1712 – 3 January 1779) was a French veterinary surgeon. He was a founder of scientifically informed veterinary medicine, and he created the world's first two veterinary schools for professional training.

== Life and career ==
Bourgelat was born at Lyon. He initially studied law and worked as a barrister, but he became interested in veterinary medicine because of his interest in horses.

In 1740, at the age of 28, Bourgelat became the head of the Lyon Academy of Horsemanship. As an amateur horsemanship enthusiast, he developed a style of horse riding that is still used as of today. In 1750 Bourgelat wrote a book on the topic of veterinary medicine, in which he considered the idea of founding a veterinary school.

He followed through on this idea when he co-founded the first two veterinary schools in the world, the École nationale vétérinaire de Lyon in 1761 (Note: Also variously given as 1762 or 1764.) and the École nationale vétérinaire d'Alfort in 1765. He founded the veterinary college specifically to combat the cattle plague (also called the rinderpest), and students trained at the Lyon veterinary college were credited with helping to cure the disease.

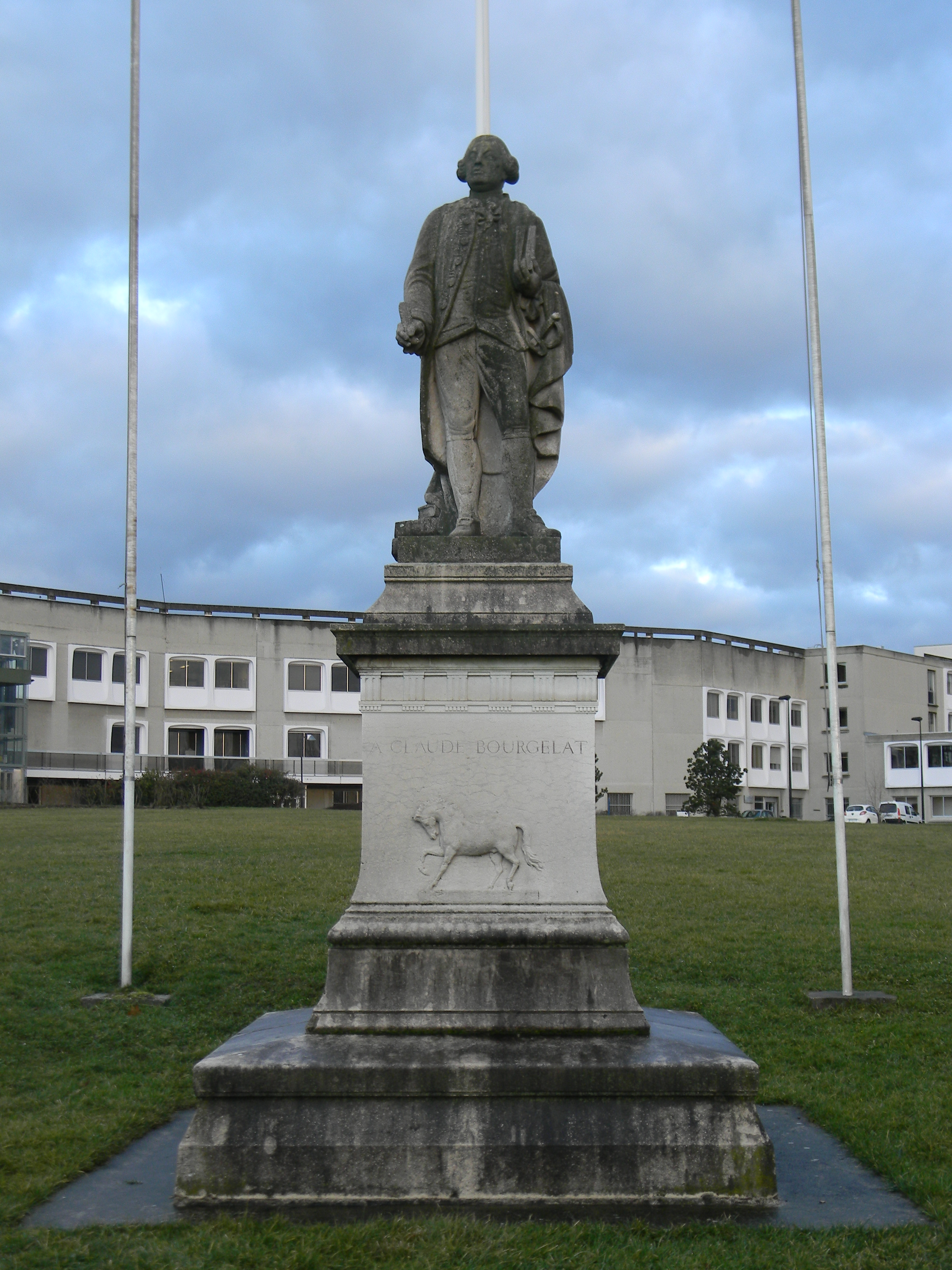
Monument, Lyon

Bourgelat was noted for being an early practitioner of scientifically informed veterinary medicine, which incorporated ideas from natural history, chemistry, clinical medicine, and comparative anatomy.

Bourgelat was a member of the French Academy of Sciences and the Prussian Academy of Sciences. He also contributed more than 235 articles to Diderot and d'Alambert's Encyclopédie, ou dictionnaire raisonné des sciences, des arts et des métiers.

== Selected works ==
- Élémens d'hippiatrique, ou, Nouveaux principes sur la connoissance et sur la médecine des chevaux (1750)
- L'art vétérinaire (1761)
- Matiere médicale raisonnée; ou, Précis des médicamens considérés dans leurs effets, a l'usage des éleves de l'Ecole royale vétérinaire; avec les formules médicinales. Lyon, Jean-Marie Bruyset (1765)
- Lehrbegriff der medicinischen Materie; oder, Beschreibung der einfachen Arzeneyen nach ihren Wirkungen; nebst den Medicinischen Formeln. Zum Gebrauche der Lehrlinge in der königl. Vieharzeneyschule zu Lyon. Aus dem Französischen übersetzt. Leipzig, M. G. Wiedmanns Erben und Reich (1766)
- Matiere médicale raisonnée, ou, Précis des médicamens considérés dans leurs effets. Lyon, Chez Jean-Marie Bruyset (1771)
- Elémens de l'art vétérinaire. Précis anatomique du corps du cheval, à l'usage des éleves des écoles vétérinaires. Paris, Vallat-la-Chapelle (1791)

== See also ==
- Veterinary education in France
