= Sheikh Said (disambiguation) =

Sheikh Said, also spelled Shaikh and/or Sa'id, Sa'īd, Saïd, Saeed may refer to:

== People ==
- Mustafa Abu al-Yazid, al-Qaeda commander in Afghanistan
- Sa'id ibn Zayd, companion of Muhammad
- Sheikh Sa'id bin Tahnun, Sheikh of Abu Dhabi 1845–1855 (lived c. 1827–1856)
- Sheikh Said, leader of the Kurdish movement in Turkey in 1925
- Saeed Abubakr Zakaria (Afa Seidu), leader of Anbariya Sunni Community in Tamale, Ghana
- Ekrima Sa'id Sabri, Grand Mufti of Jerusalem and Palestine until 2006

== Places ==
- Cheikh Saïd, peninsula of Yemen facing Perim briefly occupied by French merchants in 1868, named after Sa'id ibn Zayd
