= Créteil–Université station =

Metro station in Créteil, France

Créteil–Université
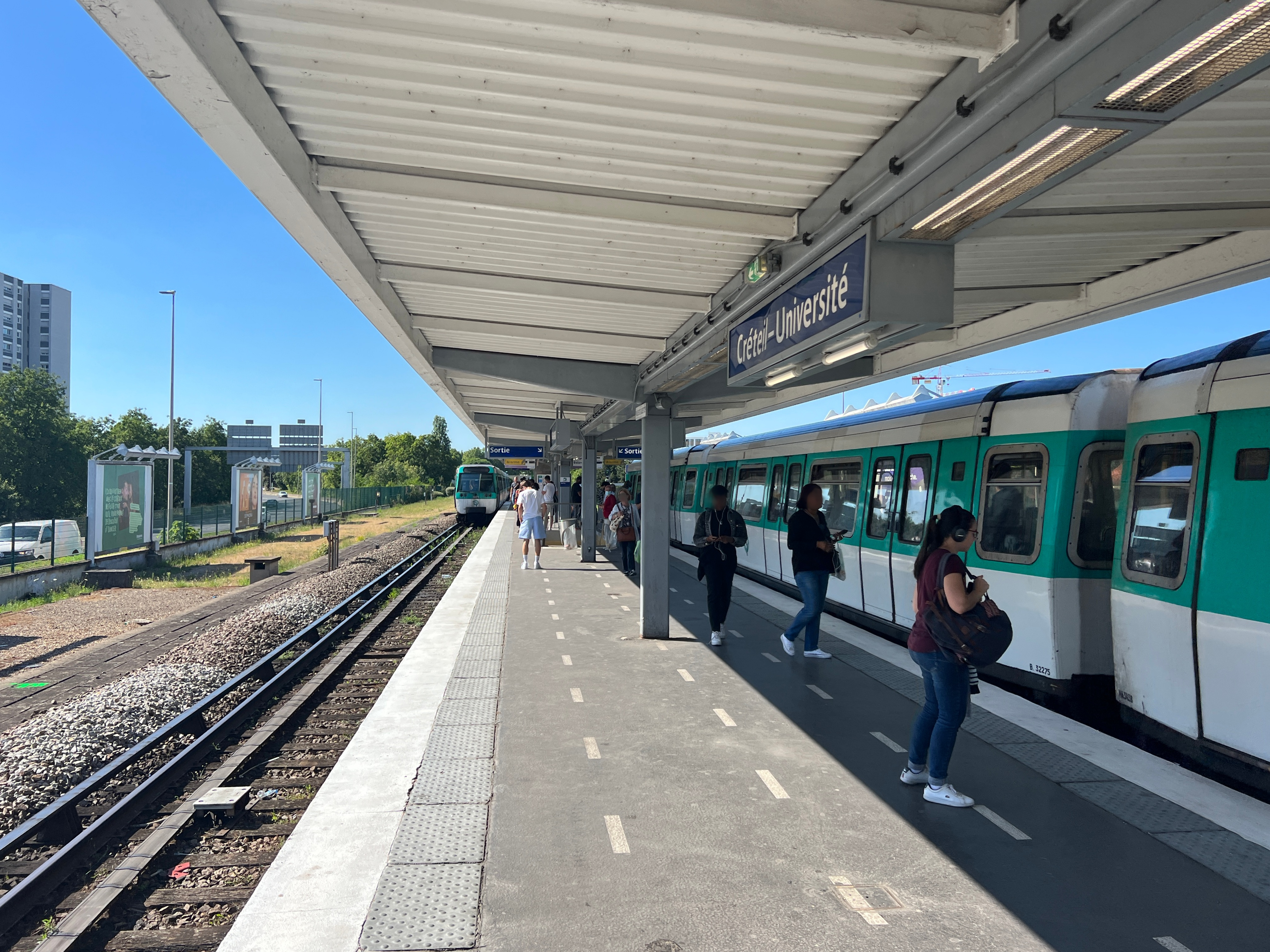
- Créteil–Université station platform

General information
- Location: Créteil; France
- Coordinates: 48°47′23″N 2°27′03″E
- Operator: RATP Group
- Platforms: 1 island platform
- Tracks: 2
- Connections: RATP Bus: Tvm 181 281 317; Noctilien: N32 N71

Construction
- Structure type: Highway median, at-grade
- Parking: Yes
- Cycle facilities: Covered racks
- Accessible: At least one escalator or lift in the station between the street and the platform

Other information
- Station code: 2506
- Fare zone: 3

History
- Opened: 10 September 1974

Passengers
- 2021: 2,496,595

Services
Preceding station	Paris Metro	Following station
Créteil–L'Échat towards Balard	Line 8	Créteil–Préfecture towards Pointe du Lac
Location

Créteil–Université (French pronunciation: [kʁetɛj ynivɛʁsite]; lit. 'Créteil–University') is an at-grade station on Line 8 of the Paris Métro in the suburban commune of Créteil. It is located in the middle of Route départementale 1 (RD 1). Its name refers to the nearby Paris-East Créteil University.

== History ==
The station opened on 10 September 1974 as part of the line's extension from Créteil–L'Échat to Créteil–Préfecture. It owes its name to its location in the municipal territory of Créteil as well as to its proximity to the headquarters and main site of the Paris-East Créteil University (UPEC), a French multidisciplinary institution also known as Paris XII.

In 2019, the station was used by 3,536,972 passengers, making it the 137th busiest of the Métro network out of 302 stations.

In 2020, the station was used by 1,935,234 passengers amidst the COVID-19 pandemic, making it the 125th busiest of the Métro network out of 304 stations.

In 2021, the station was used by 2,496,595 passengers, making it the 135th busiest of the Métro network out of 304 stations.

== Passenger services ==
=== Access ===
The station has two accesses:

- Access 1: Mail des Mèches (pedestrian mall) / Paris-East Créteil University
- Access 2: Route de Choisy / Hôpital Albert Chenevier

=== Station layout ===
Platform level	Westbound	← toward Balard (Créteil–L'Échat)
Platform level	Island platform, doors will open on the left
Platform level	Eastbound	toward Pointe du Lac (Créteil–Préfecture) →
1F	Mezzanine
Street level

=== Platforms ===
Créteil–Université is an elevated station with a particular configuration. It has a central platform framed by the two tracks of the metro. This platform is equipped with Akiko style seats in blue, replacing Motte seats in the same shade; the name of the station is inscribed in Parisine font on suspended backlit panels. The metal advertising frames were moved to the limits of the line's rights-of-way, the width of which made it possible to build an additional track and platform.

The access corridors to the platform are decorated with light ochre-coloured tiles that can also be found on the platforms of the stations established on the territory of the neighbouring municipality of Maisons-Alfort (École vétérinaire de Maisons-Alfort, Maisons-Alfort-Stade and Maisons-Alfort-Les Juilliottes), except that they have several different shades of ochre in the latter and not only the lightest shade.

== Nearby ==
- Hôpital Albert-Chenevier
- Paris-East Créteil University

== Gallery ==
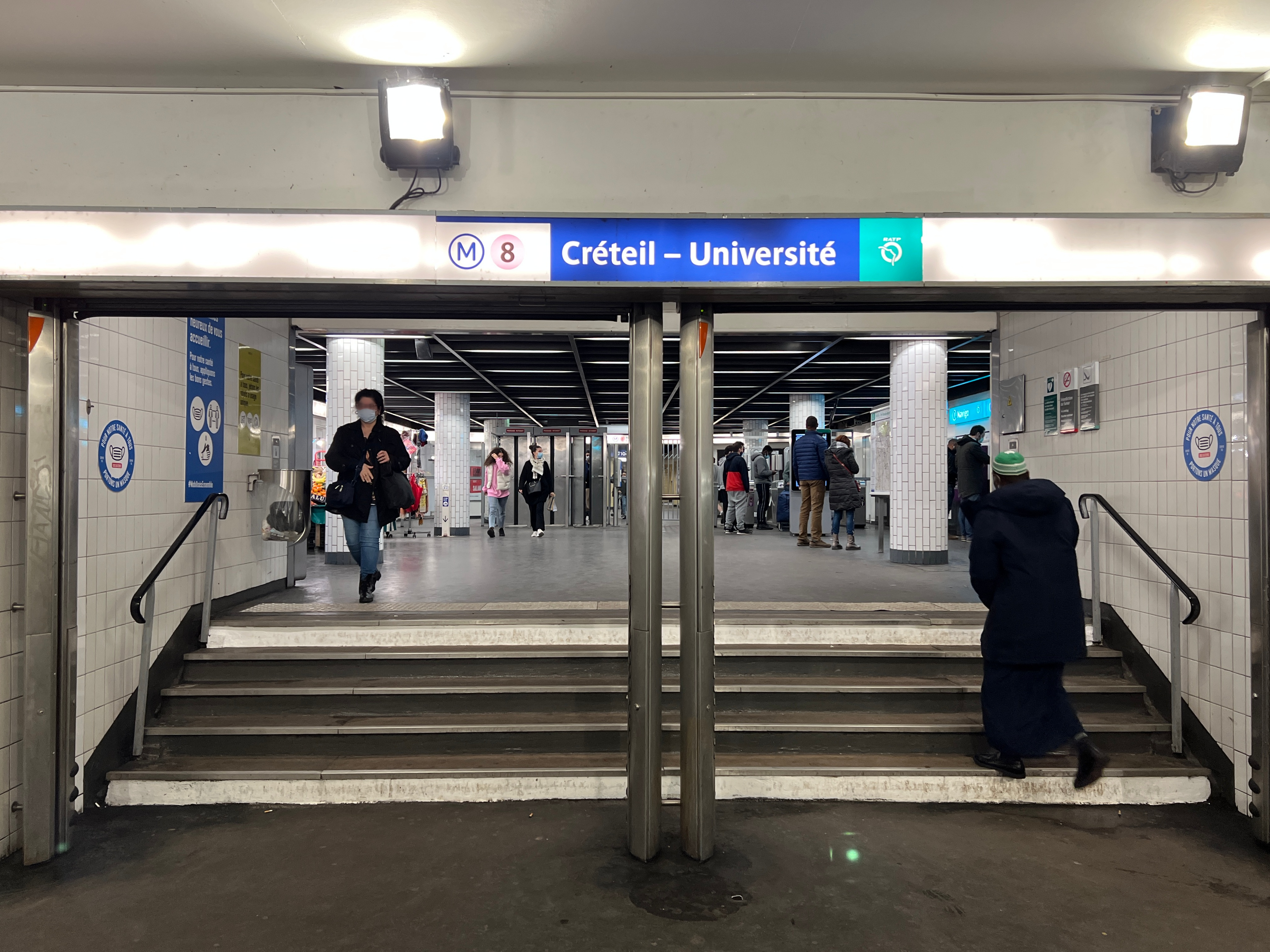
Mezzanine

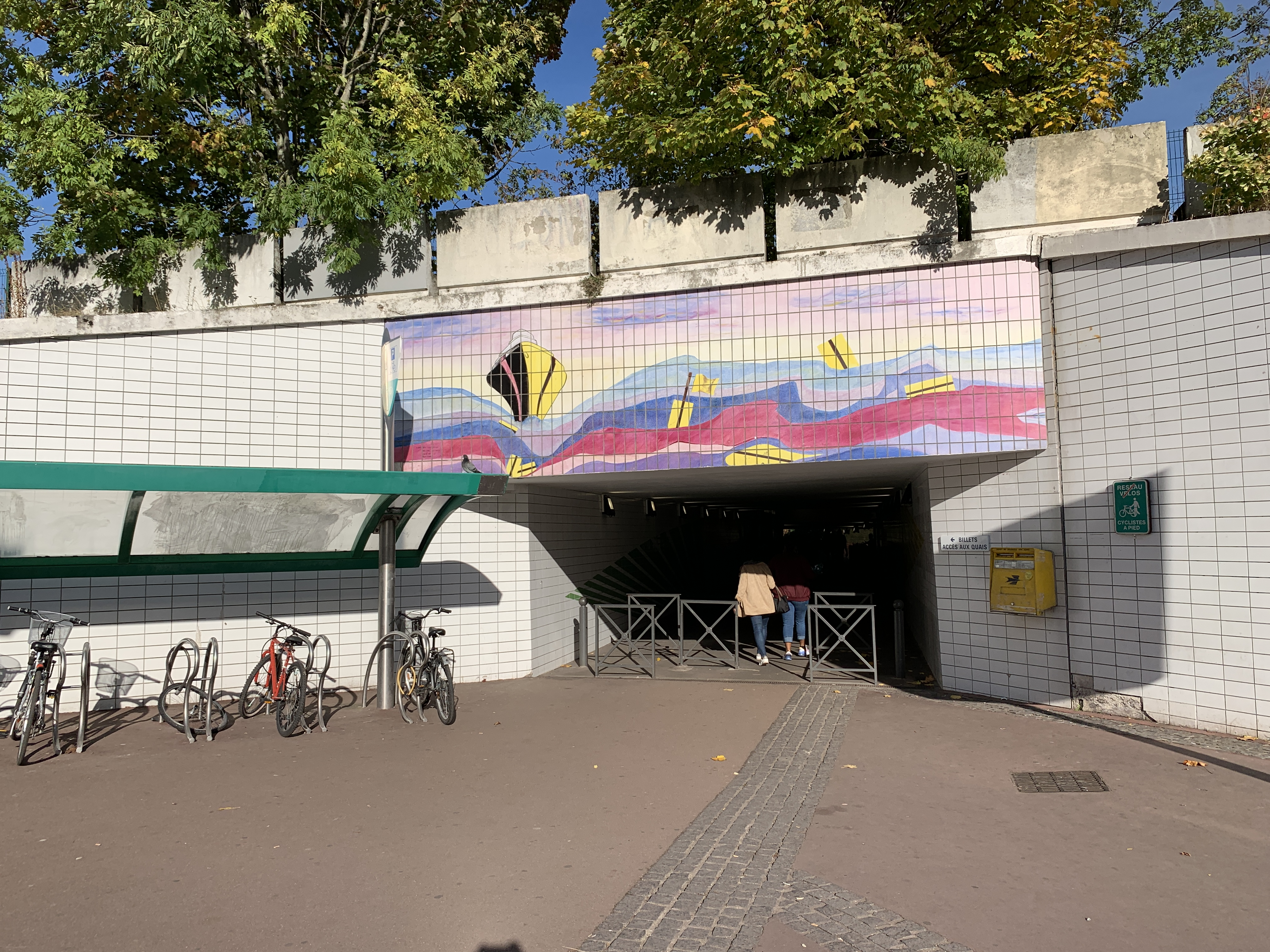
Access 1

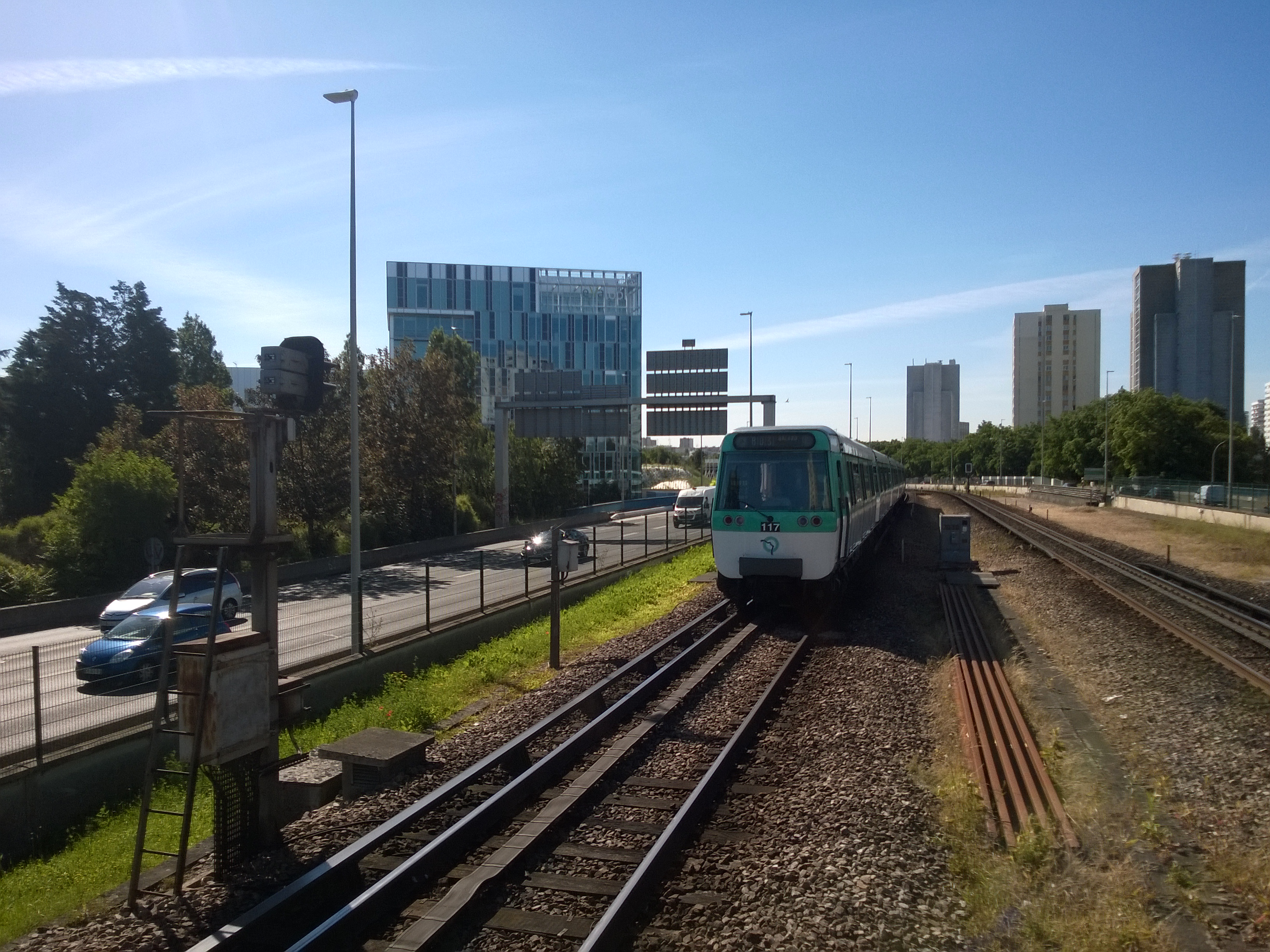
MF 77 on approach towards the station, with RD 1 on the left
