= Créteil–L'Échat station =

Metro station in Créteil, France

Créteil–L'Échat Hôpital Henri Mondor
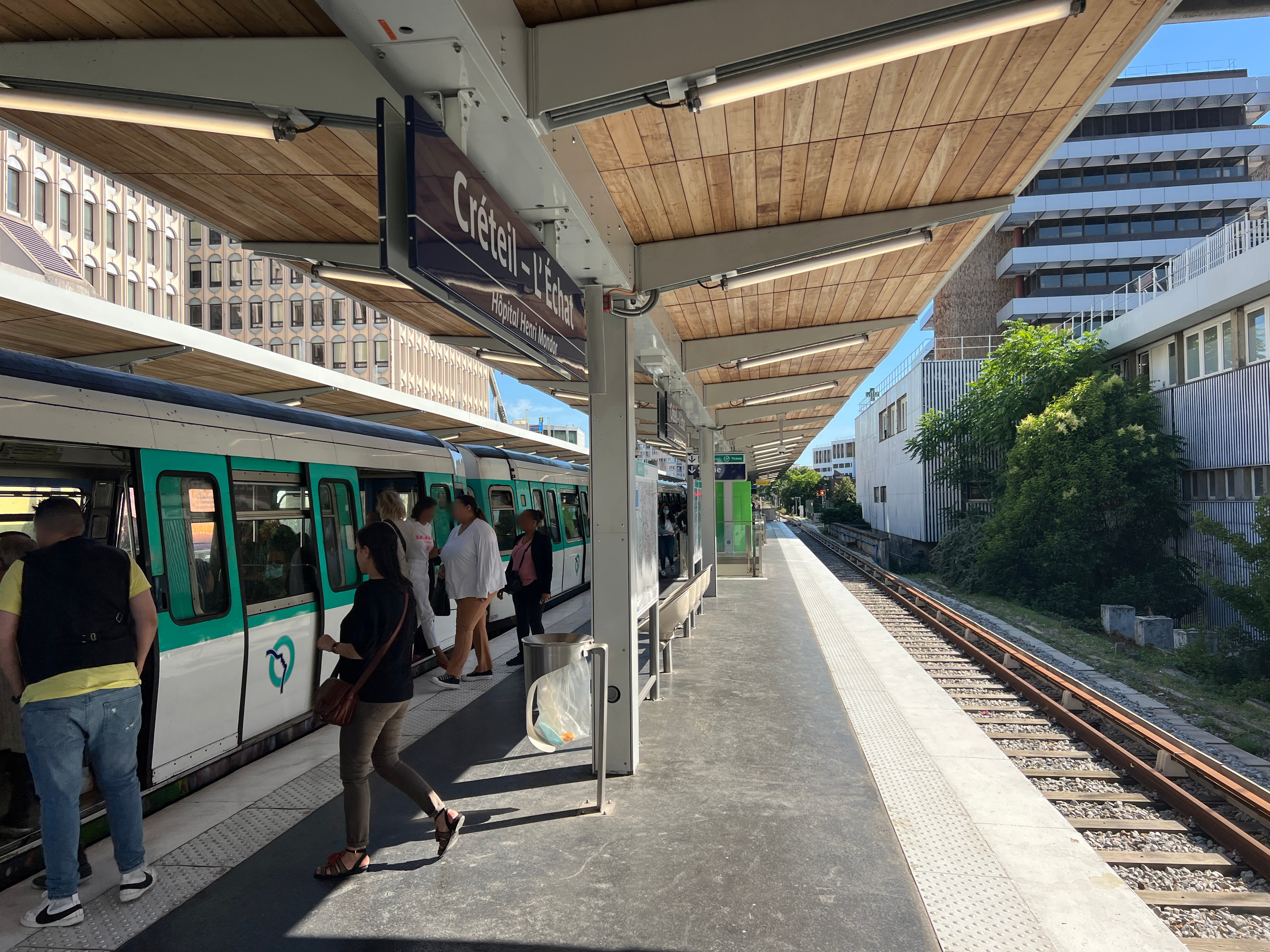
- Créteil–L'Échat Line 8 platform

General information
- Location: Créteil; Île-de-France; France
- Coordinates: 48°47′45″N 2°26′58″E
- Operator: Line 8: RATP Group; Line 15: ORA (RATP Dev, Alstom & ComfortDelGro)
- Platforms: Line 8: 2 island platforms; Line 15: 2 side platforms
- Tracks: Line 8: 3; Line 15: 2

Construction
- Depth: Line 15: 21 m (69 ft)
- Accessible: Line 8: At least one escalator or lift in the station between the street and the platform; Line 15: Yes
- Architect: Line 15: Cyril Trétout (ANMA)

Other information
- Station code: 2505
- Fare zone: 2/3

History
- Opened: 27 September 1973

Passengers
- 1,209,224 (2020)

Services
Preceding station	Paris Metro	Following station
Maisons-Alfort–Les Juilliottes towards Balard	Line 8	Créteil–Université towards Pointe du Lac

Future services
Preceding station	Paris Metro	Following station
Le Vert de Maisons towards Pont de Sèvres	Line 15 (autumn 2027)	Saint-Maur–Créteil towards Noisy–Champs
Location
- Location within Paris and inner ring

Créteil–L'Échat (French pronunciation: [kʁetɛj leʃa]) is a station on Line 8 of the Paris Metro in the suburban commune of Créteil. Situated in an open cut segment, it is the last exposed station on the Line 8 before going into central Paris. As part of the Grand Paris Express project, Line 15 will also stop here soon, starting in autumn 2027. The station is named for and located in the L'Échat business district.

== History ==
The station opened on 26 September 1973 with the extension of the line from Maisons-Alfort–Les Juilliottes. It was the southeastern terminus of the line until its extension to Créteil–Préfecture on 9 September 1974. It is named after the Échat district of Créteil. It was the first station not located underground since an extension of Line 6 in 1909.

In 2017, construction started on Line 15's station, which is located underground; service will begin in autumn 2027.

In 2019, the station was used by 2,253,948 passengers, making it the 229th busiest of the Metro network, out of 302 stations.

In 2020, the station was used by 1,209,224 passengers amidst the COVID-19 pandemic, making it the 213th busiest of the Metro network, out of 304 stations.

In February 2021, the station was renovated with the addition of another island platform and a new ticketing hall, along with the modernisation of equipment to cater for the increased traffic expected when line 15 opens in 2027. In March 2021, the station also received 2 paintings by the artist RAF URBAN as part of his DIVERSITY IS HOPE project.

On 20 December 2021, the last tunnel boring machine, Marina, for line 15 south reached Créteil–L'Échat, thus completing the digging of line 15 south's tunnels after more than 3 years, and the start of a new construction phase with the installation of equipment in the station and tunnels.

== Passenger services ==
=== Access ===
- Access 1: Rue Gustave Eiffel Hôpital Henri-Mondor
- Access 2: Voie Félix Eboué
- Access 3: Avenue du Général de Gaulle Galerie commercial
- Access 4: Rue Albert Einstein

=== Platforms ===
Créteil–L'Échat is an aboveground station and originally had a single island platform flanked by two tracks, with an unused siding towards the west side of the station. On 12 February 2021, an additional island platform was commissioned such that each direction (Balard and Créteil–Pointe du Lac) has their own platform in anticipation of heavier traffic once line 15 opens. The existing metro station was modified with the creation of a corridor to reach the line 15 station which will be under the tracks of line 8. The existing entrance hall was refurbished to accommodate connecting flows.

The seats are in the white Akiko style and the name of the station is inscribed in Parisine font on enamelled plaques. Until the end of 2020, before the renovation of the platforms, the name of the station was featured on backlit panels.

=== Other connections ===
Créteil–L'Échat is also served by lines 172 and 281 of the RATP bus network, by lines B, O1, and O2 bus of the Transdev STRAV network, by line 100 of the Transdev Lys network, and at night, by lines N32 and N35 of the Noctilien bus network.

== Gallery ==
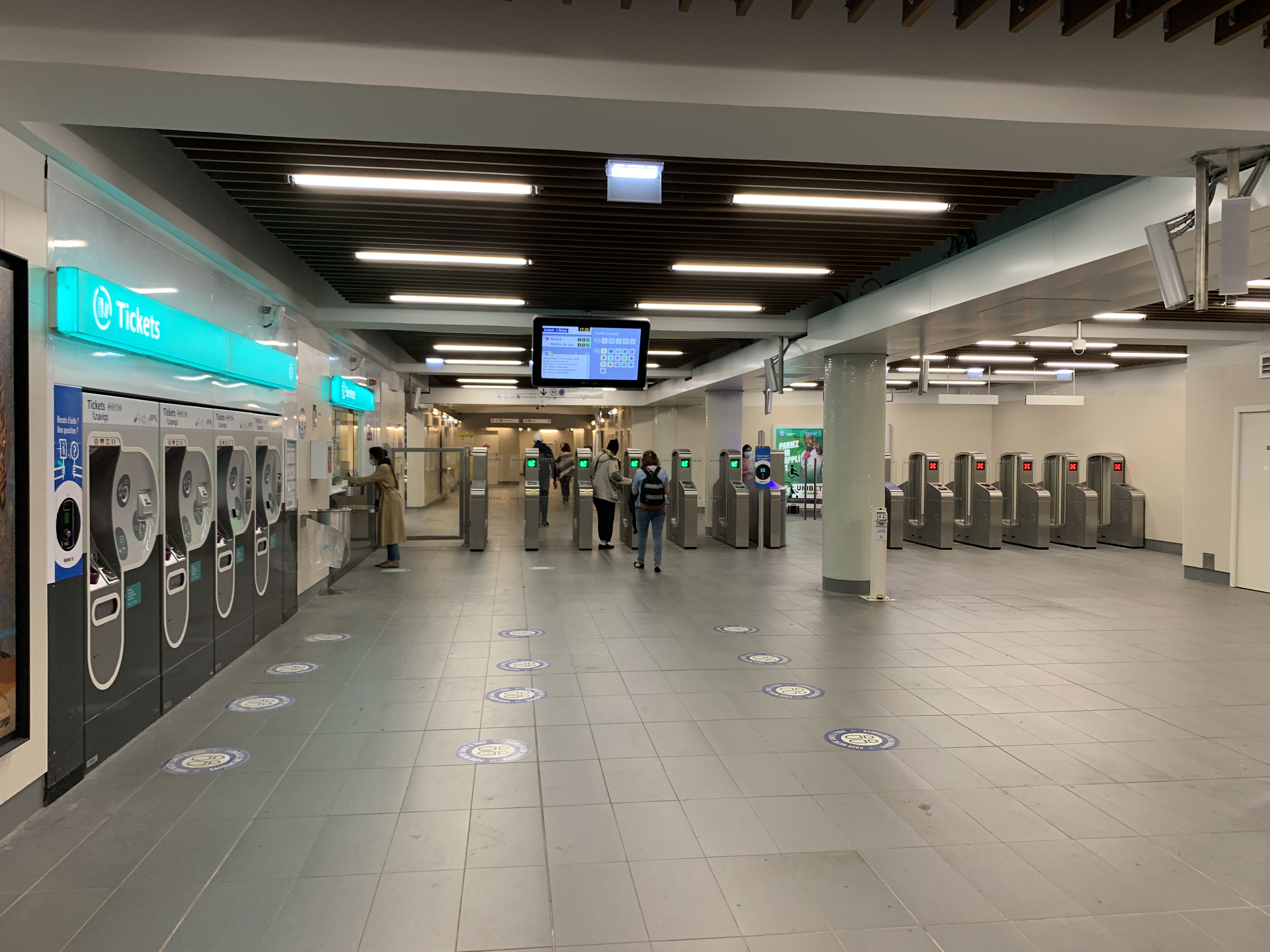
Mezzanine and ticketing hall

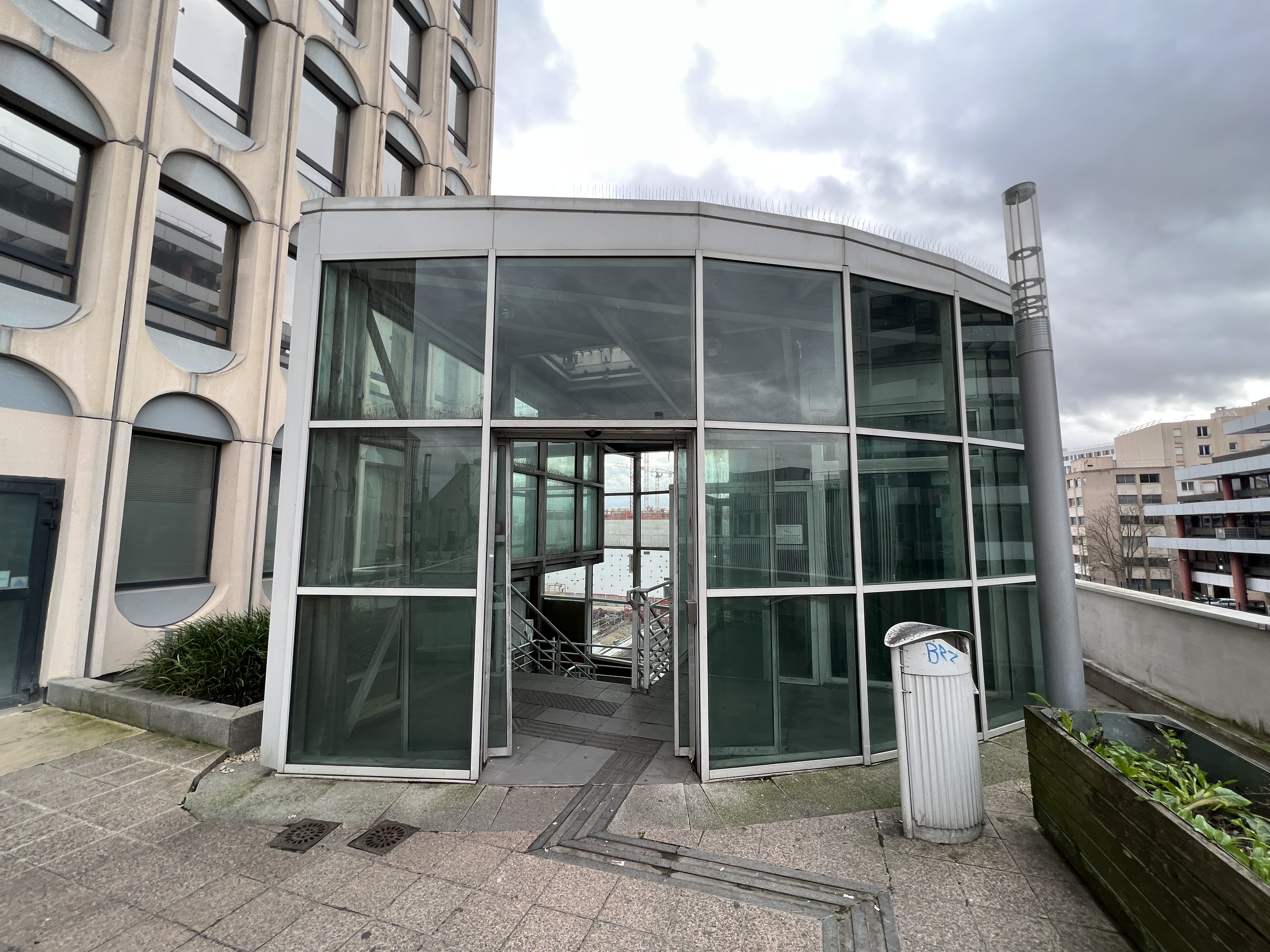
Entrance at Voie Félix Eboué

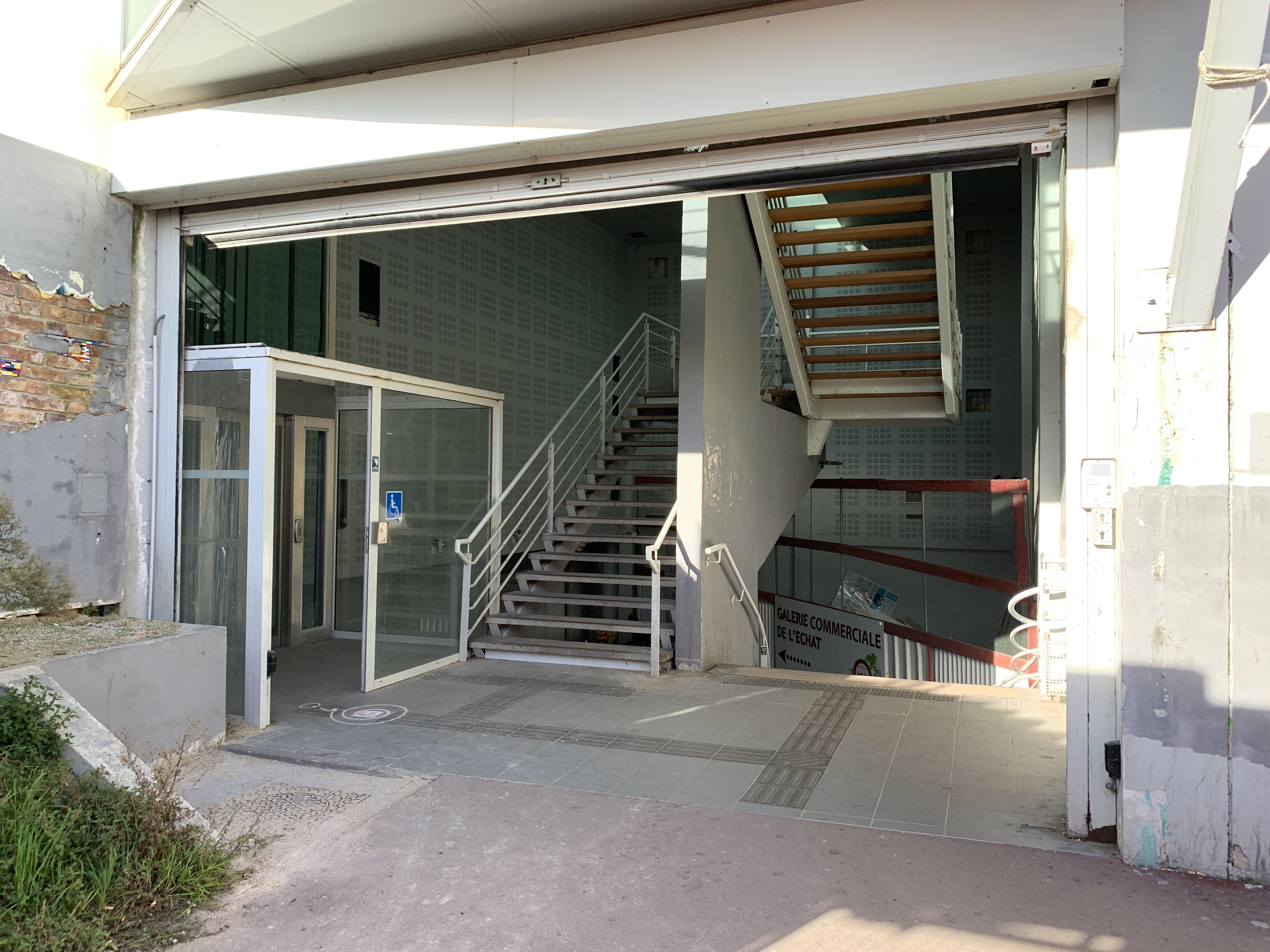
Entrance at Rue Gustave Eiffel

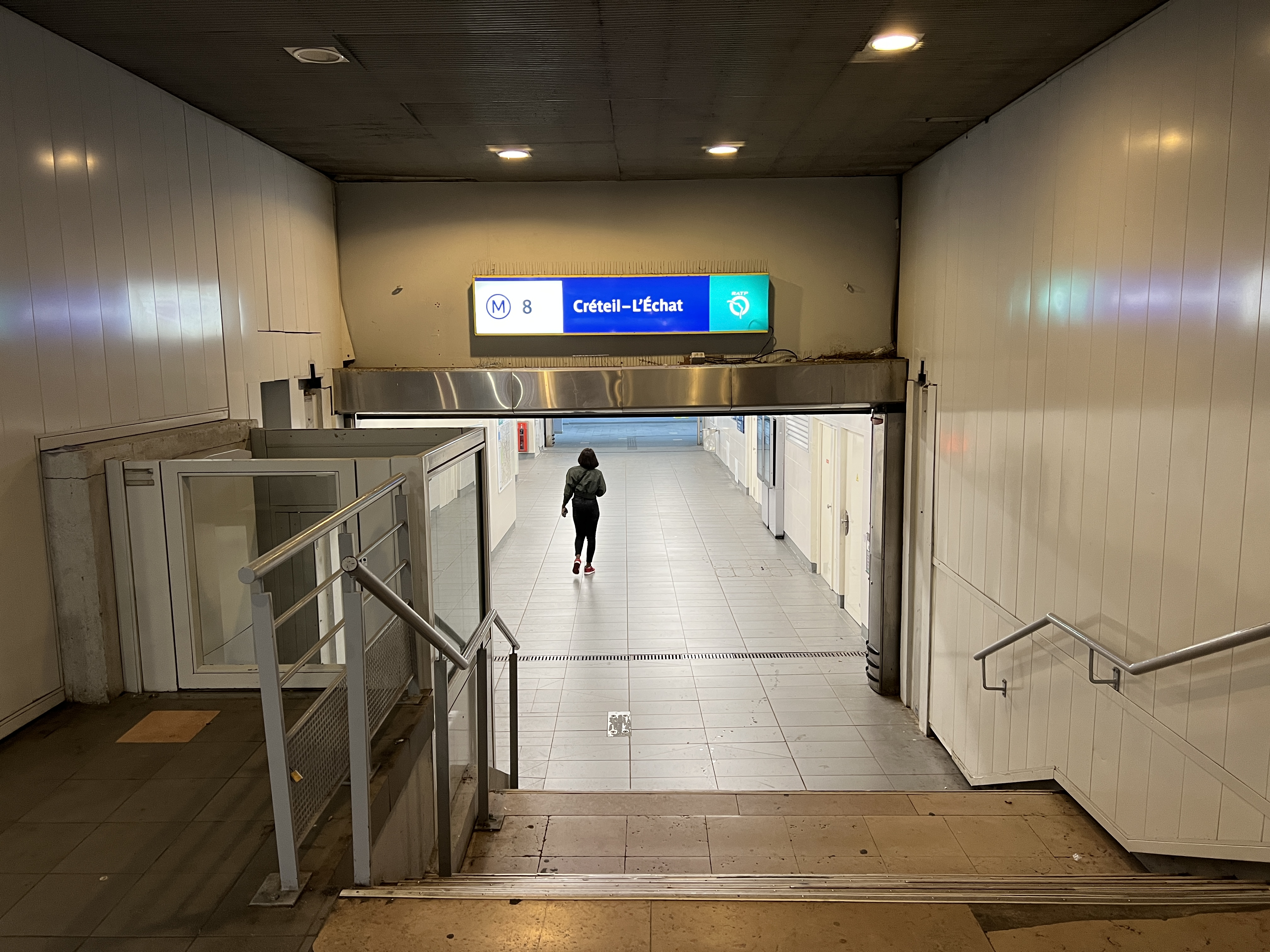
Entrance at Galerie commercial

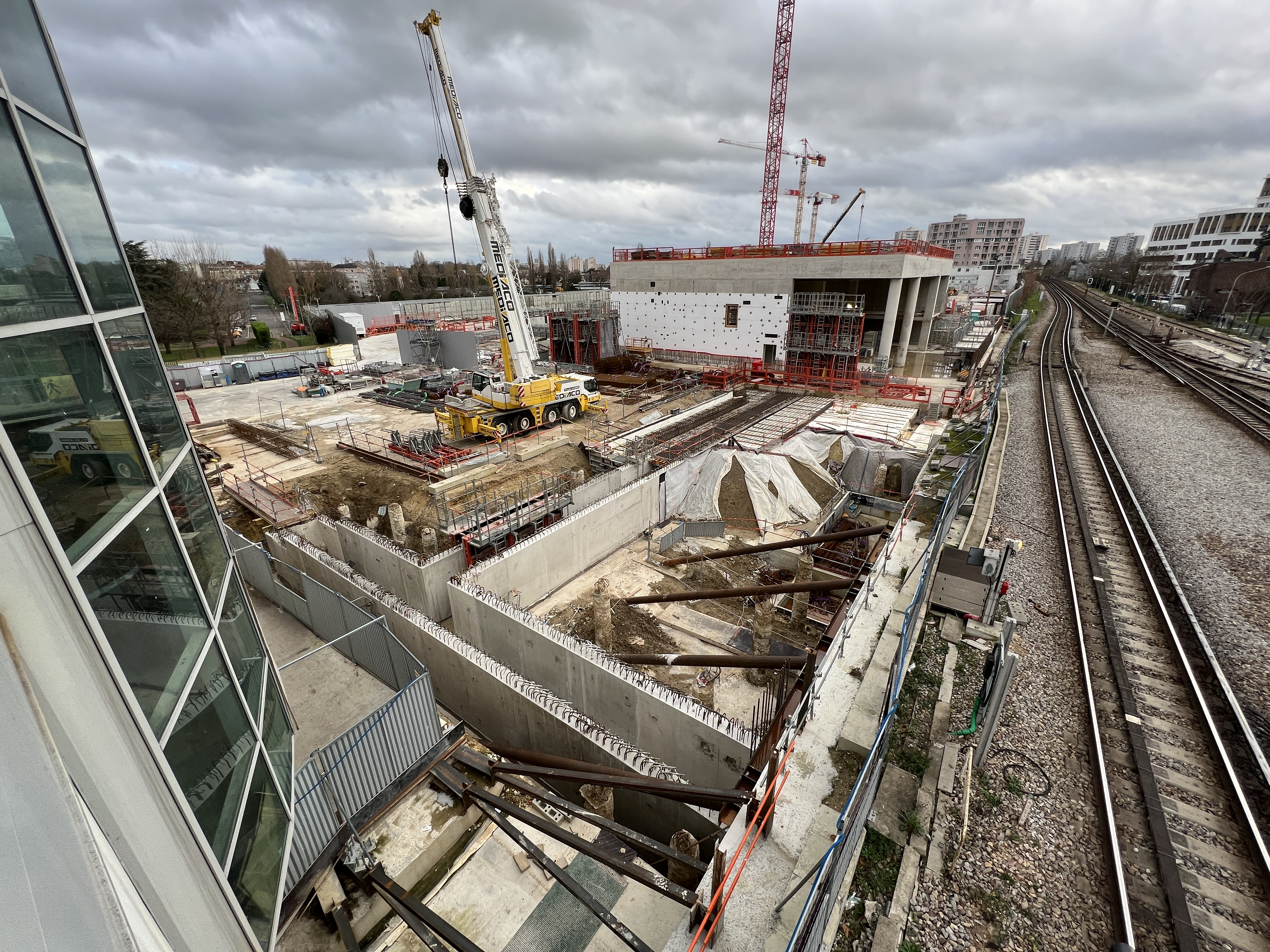
Construction of Line 15's station at Créteil–L'Échat (2022)

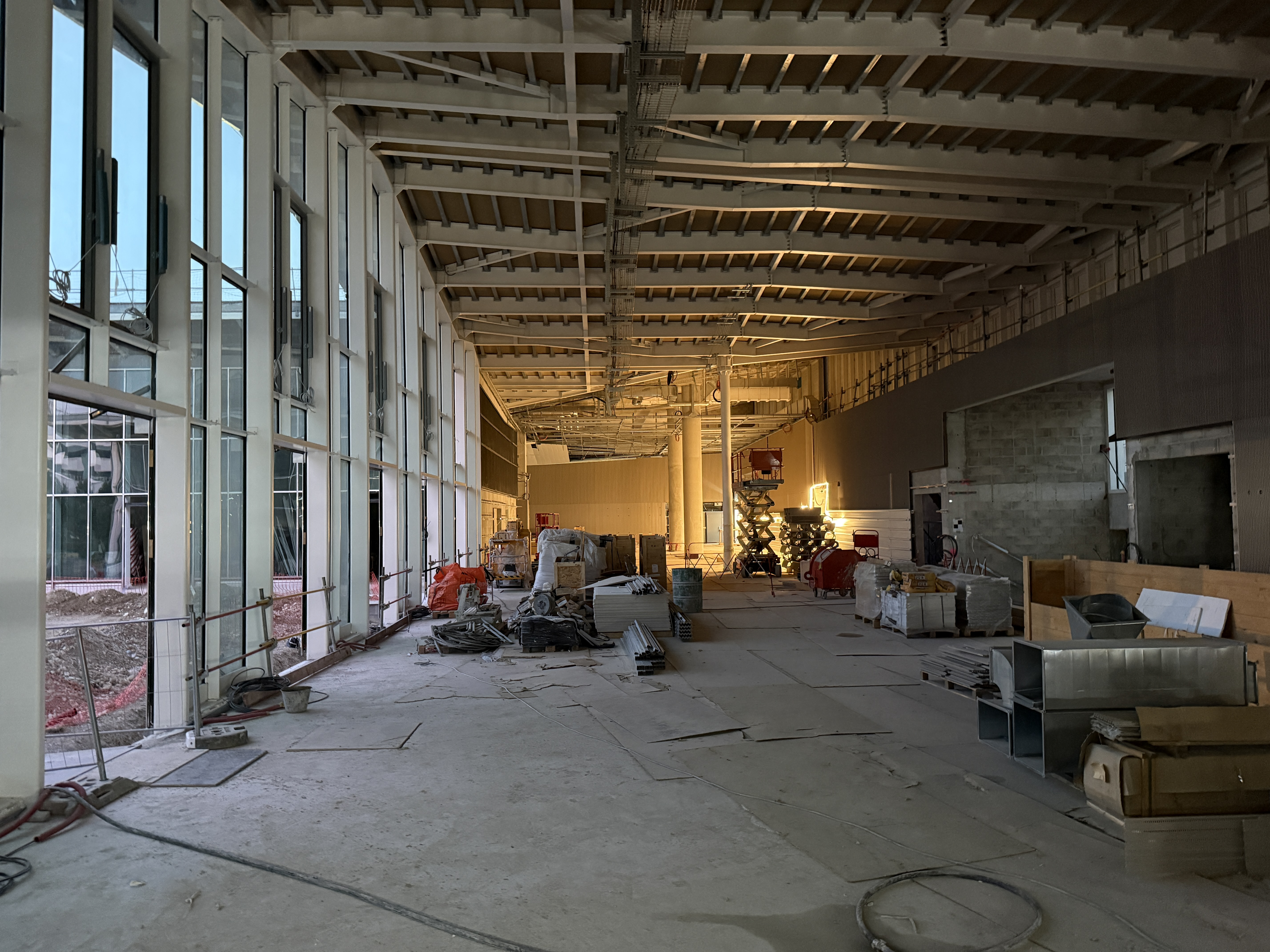
Line 15's station building in 2025
