= Maisons-Alfort–Les Juilliottes station =

Metro station in Maisons-Alfort, France

Maisons-Alfort–Les Juilliottes
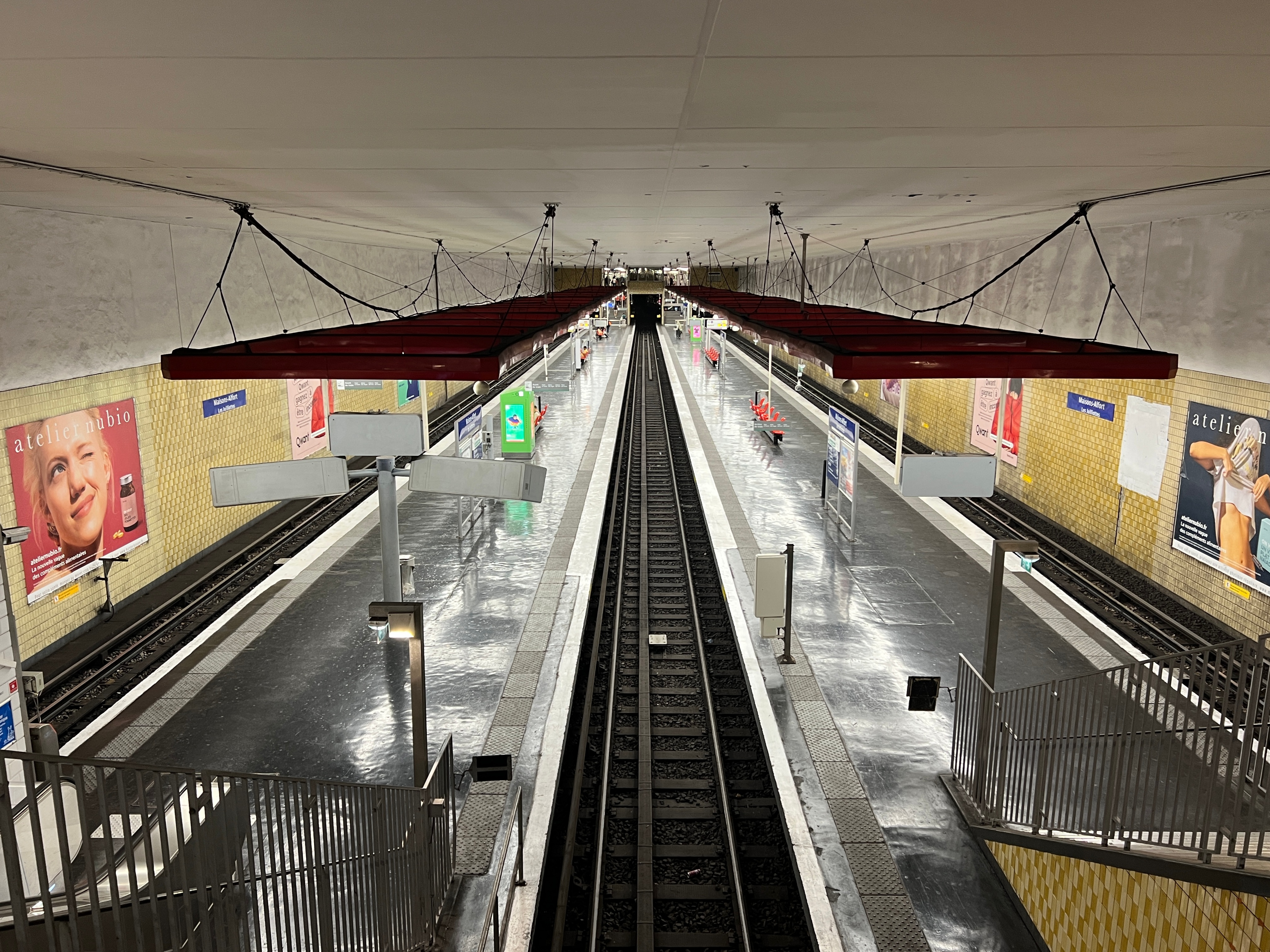
- Platforms

General information
- Location: Maisons-Alfort; Île-de-France; France
- Coordinates: 48°48′09″N 2°26′47″E
- System: Paris Métro station
- Owner: RATP
- Operator: RATP
- Line: Paris Metro Paris Metro Line 8
- Platforms: 2 (island platforms)
- Tracks: 3

Construction
- Accessible: no

Other information
- Station code: 25-04
- Fare zone: 3

History
- Opened: 27 April 1972

Passengers
- 1,297,495 (2021)

Services
| Preceding station | Paris Metro | Following station |
|---|---|---|
| Maisons-Alfort–Stade towards Balard | Line 8 | Créteil–L'Échat towards Pointe du Lac |
Location
- Location within Paris and inner ring

Maisons-Alfort–Les Juilliottes (French pronunciation: [mɛzɔ̃ alfɔʁ le ʒɥijɔt]) is a station on Line 8 of the Paris Métro in the suburban commune of Maisons-Alfort. It is named after the Juilliottes quarter of Maisons-Alfort.

== History ==
The station opened on 27 April 1972 as part of the line's extension from Porte de Charenton–Écoles, serving as its eastern terminus until it was further extended to Créteil–L'Échat on 24 September 1973.

As part of the "Un métro + beau" programme by the RATP, the station's corridors and platform lighting were renovated and modernised on 11 September 2015. As a result, despite the station being built in the 1970s, the walls of its corridors and mezzanine are clad with the traditional white beveled tiles found on the older stations on the métro. Some of the tiles have dimensions twice that of the classic tiles – a feature also found at Châtelet as well as Basilique de Saint-Denis on Line 13. Only its platforms have retained its original coloured tiles.

In 2019, the station was used by 1,779,627 passengers, making it the 260th busiest of the Métro network out of 302 stations.

In 2020, the station was used by 905,627 passengers amidst the COVID-19 pandemic, making it the 255th busiest of the Métro network out of 304 stations.

In 2021, the station was used by 1,297,495 passengers, making it the 251st busiest of the Métro network out of 304 stations.

== Passenger services ==
=== Access ===
The station has 4 accesses:

- Access 1: rue Louis Pergaud Centre Commercial
- Access 2: avenue du Général Leclerc
- Access 3: rue du Buisson Joyeux (formerly rue Hoche, a street that stood where the highway A86 now stands)
- Access 4: avenue du Maréchal De Lattre de Tassigny (formerly an access to a bus station and loop from and towards Créteil)

The layout of the access points 3 and 4 reminds the profound changes in a district that the station preceded in its construction, built two years before the start of the A86 works. Surprisingly, accesses 1 and 2, today the busiest, do not have an escalator, unlike accesses 3 and 4 which are however less frequented. This escalator was originally intended to carry the passengers from the arrival platform of this terminus towards a bus station which has now disappeared, of which the parking lot retains the shape of the turnaround loop for buses extending the service to Créteil. Meanwhile, access 3 lead to rue Hoche (parallel to rue du Buisson Joyeux), a residential area of which absolutely nothing remains, the street and the area having been completely torn down to build the motorway A86 only two years after the construction of the station. This is how today access 4 oddly leads to a tiny car park, while access 3 bizarrely faces towards a fallow vegetation on the motorway exit embankment.

=== Station layout ===
Street level
| B1 | Mezzanine |
| Platform level | Westbound | ← toward Balard (Maisons-Alfort–Stade) |
| Platform level | Island platform, doors will open on the left |
| Platform level | Eastbound | toward Pointe du Lac (Créteil–L'Échat) → |
| Platform level | Island platform, not in service |
| Platform level | Eastbound | No regular service |

=== Platforms ===
The station has a particular arrangement specific to the stations serving or had served as a terminus. It has three tracks and two island platforms, of which only 1 island platform and two tracks are in regular use.

Built in the 1970s, it is a box station with vertical walls and a horizontal ceiling due to its cut-and-cover construction. The decoration, typical of the 1970s, is similar to a variation of the Mouton-Duvernet style with walls and tunnel exits covered with tiles in various shades of ochre (sand-coloured at the right of the advertisements), placed vertically and aligned, a ceiling and wall tops treated in white as well as a suspended lighting system with a red structure. The advertisements on the walls are frameless and the name of the station is inscribed in Parisine font on enamelled plaques. The seats are Motte style in red (replacing benches of the same colour).

The station shares this decorative style only with the two other stopping points of the line located on the territory of the municipality, École Vétérinaire de Maisons-Alfort and Maisons-Alfort-Stade. However, ochre-coloured tiles also exist in the access corridors to the platform of the Créteil–Université station, except that they only have the lightest shade.

=== Other connections ===
The station is also served by lines 104, 217, and 372 of the RATP bus network, and at night, by lines N32 and N35 of the Noctilien bus network.

== Nearby ==
- Cimetière de Maisons-Alfort
- Les Juilliottes

== Gallery ==
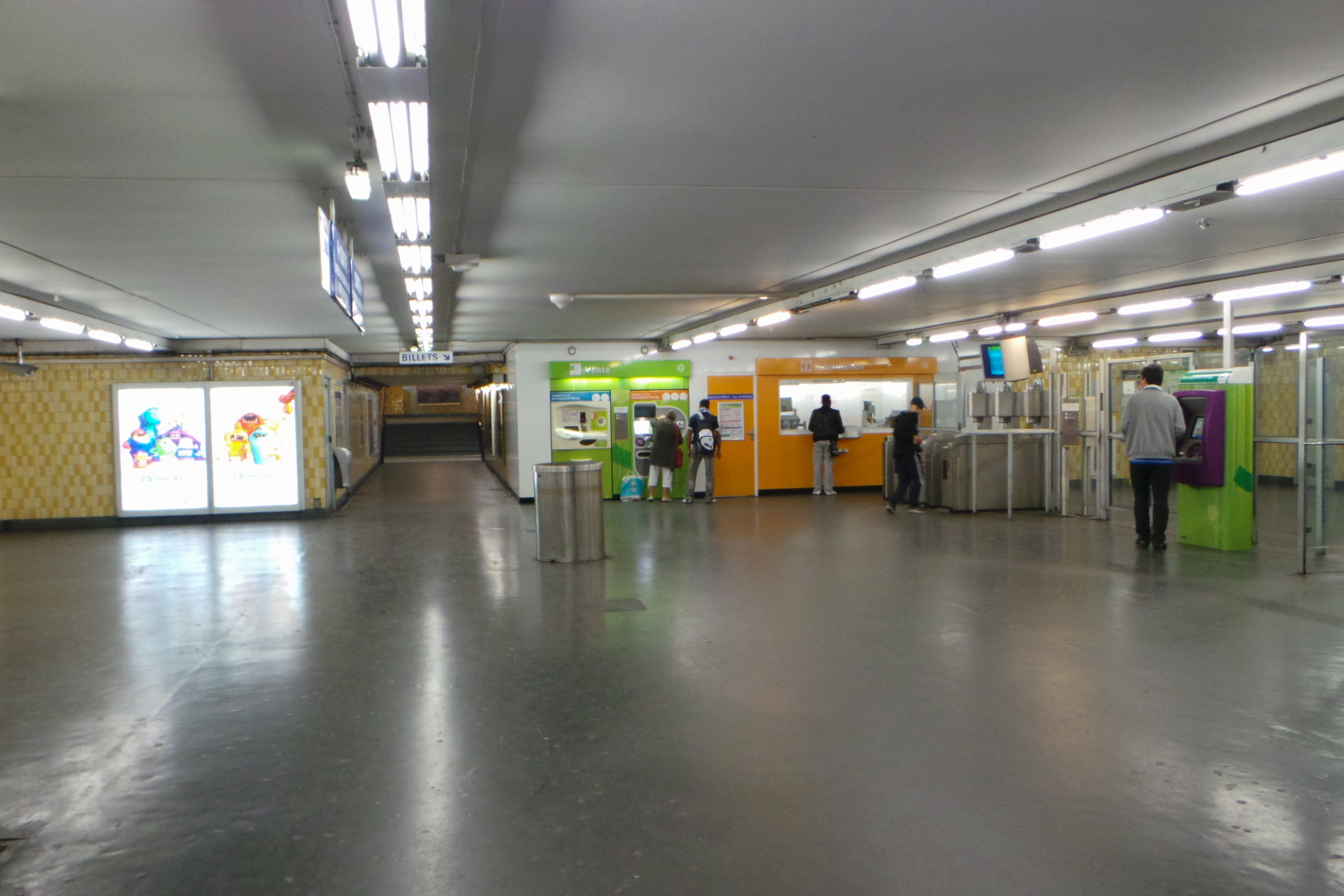
The mezzanine back in 2013 with its original tiling

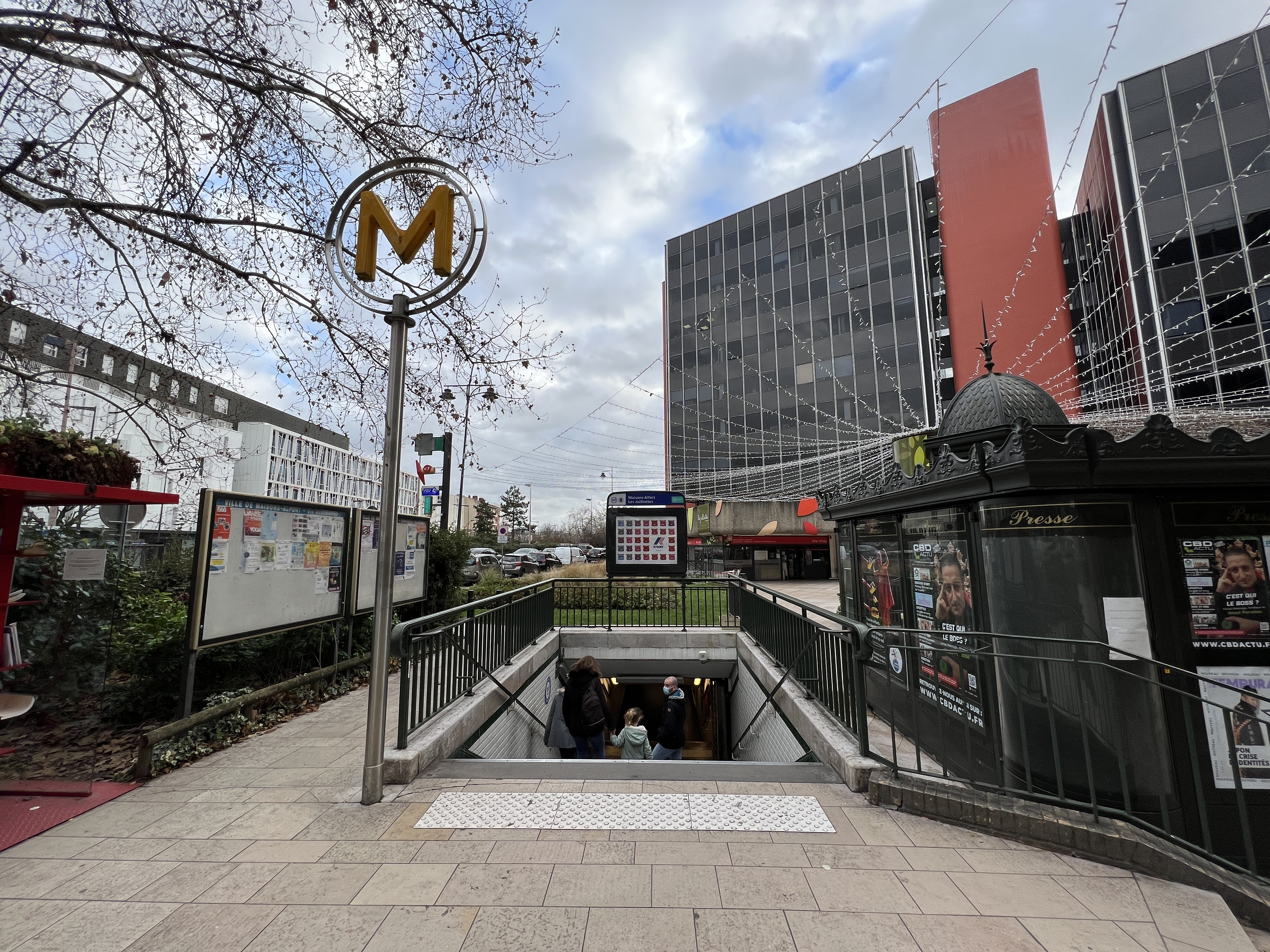
Access 1

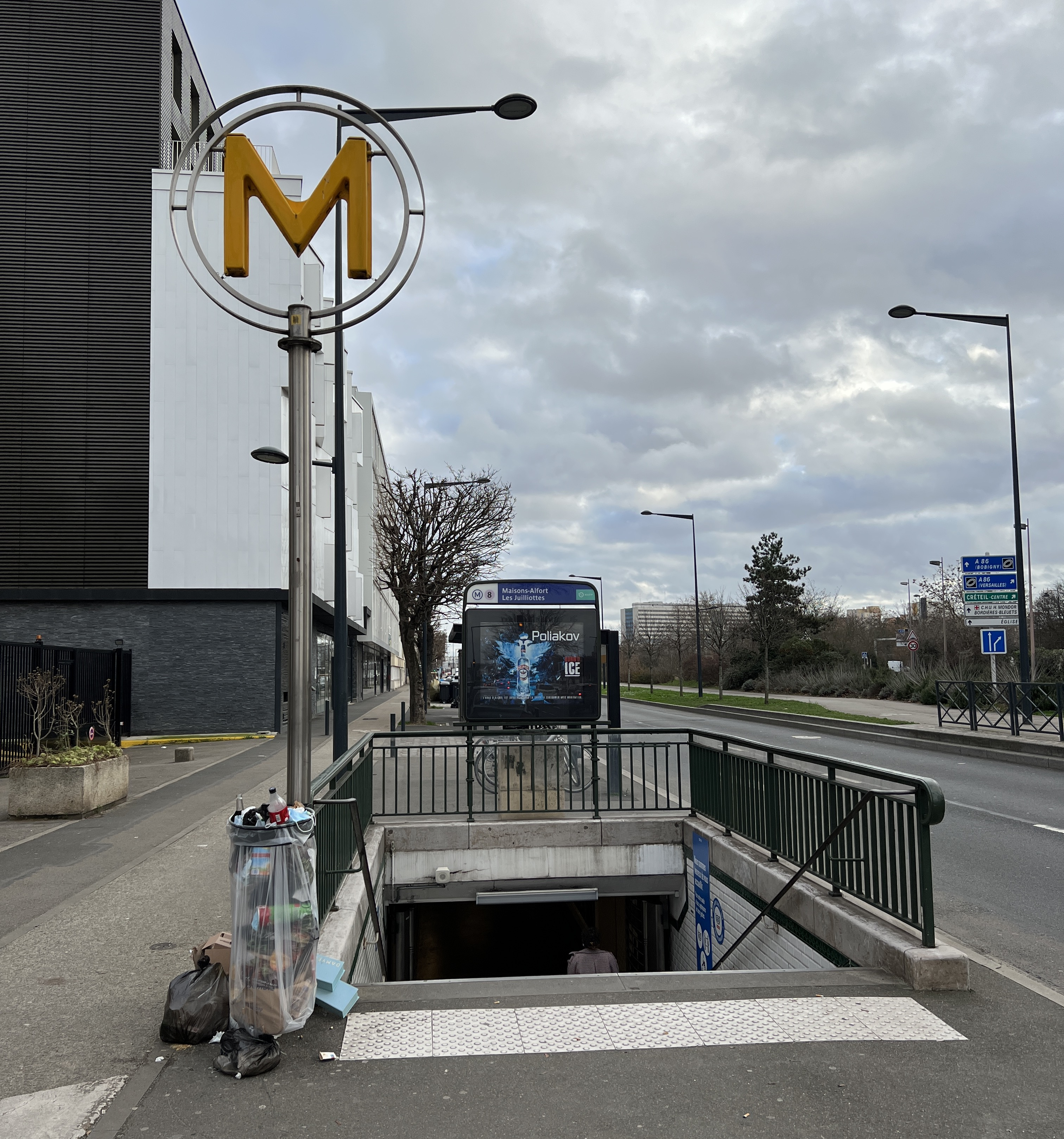
Access 2

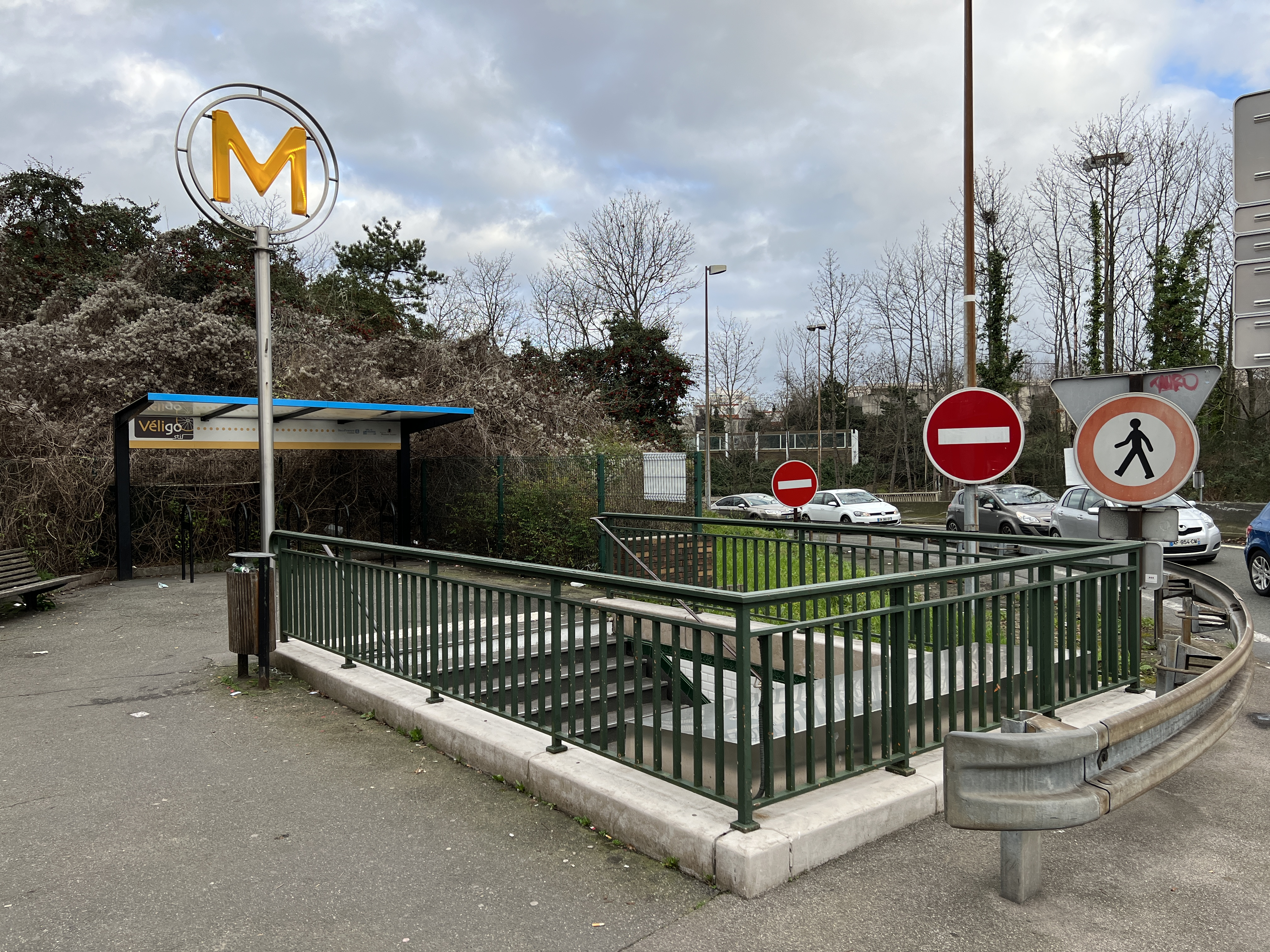
Access 3

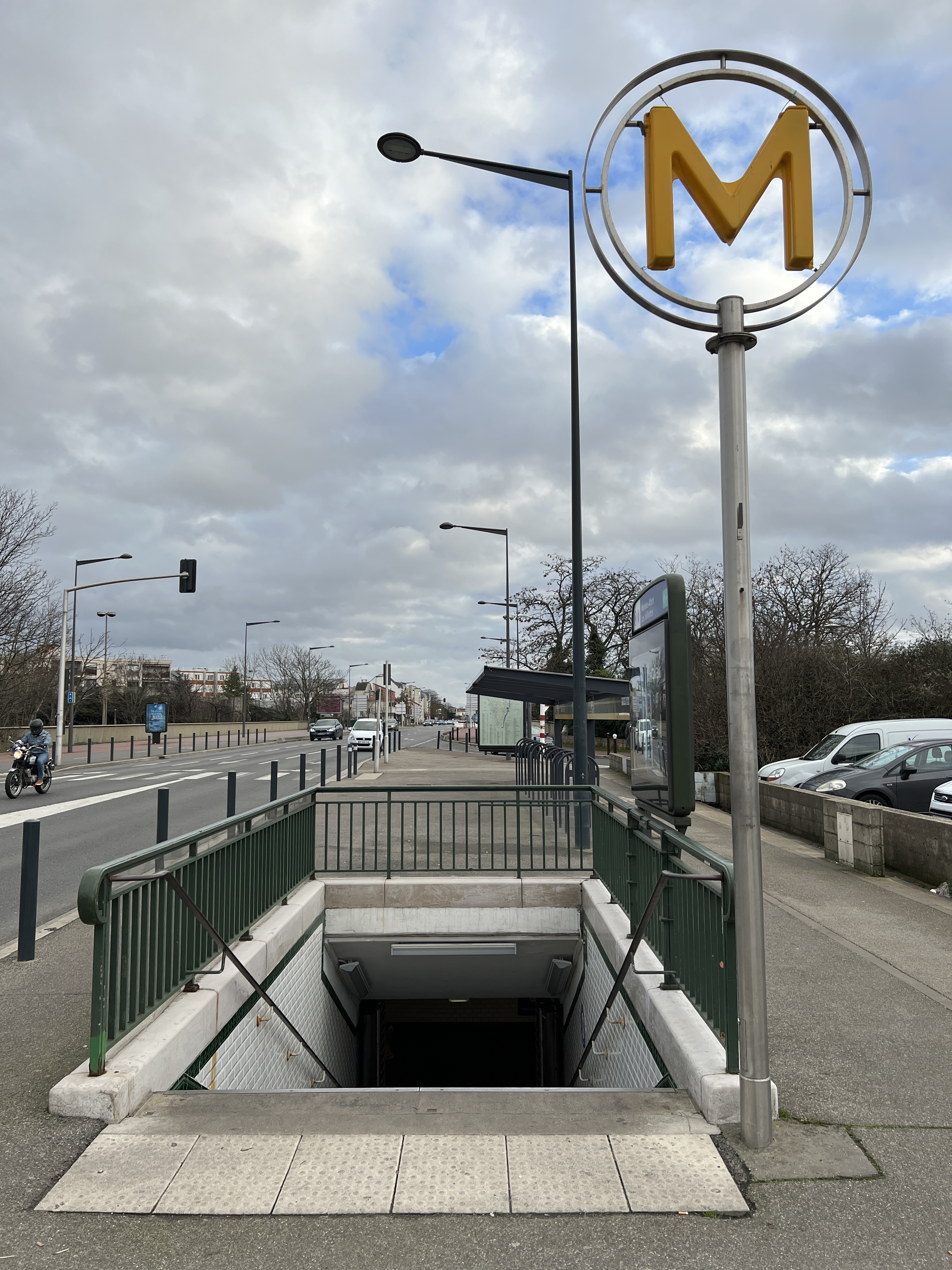
Access 4
