= Villanova station =

Villanova station may refer to:

- Villanova South station, a rapid transit station in Radnor Township, Pennsylvania
- Villanova station (SEPTA Regional Rail), a regional rail station in Radnor Township, Pennsylvania
- Villa Nova station, a cable car station in Villeneuve-Saint-Georges, Île-de-France
