= Créteil–Préfecture station =

Metro station in Créteil, France

Créteil–Préfecture Hôtel de Ville
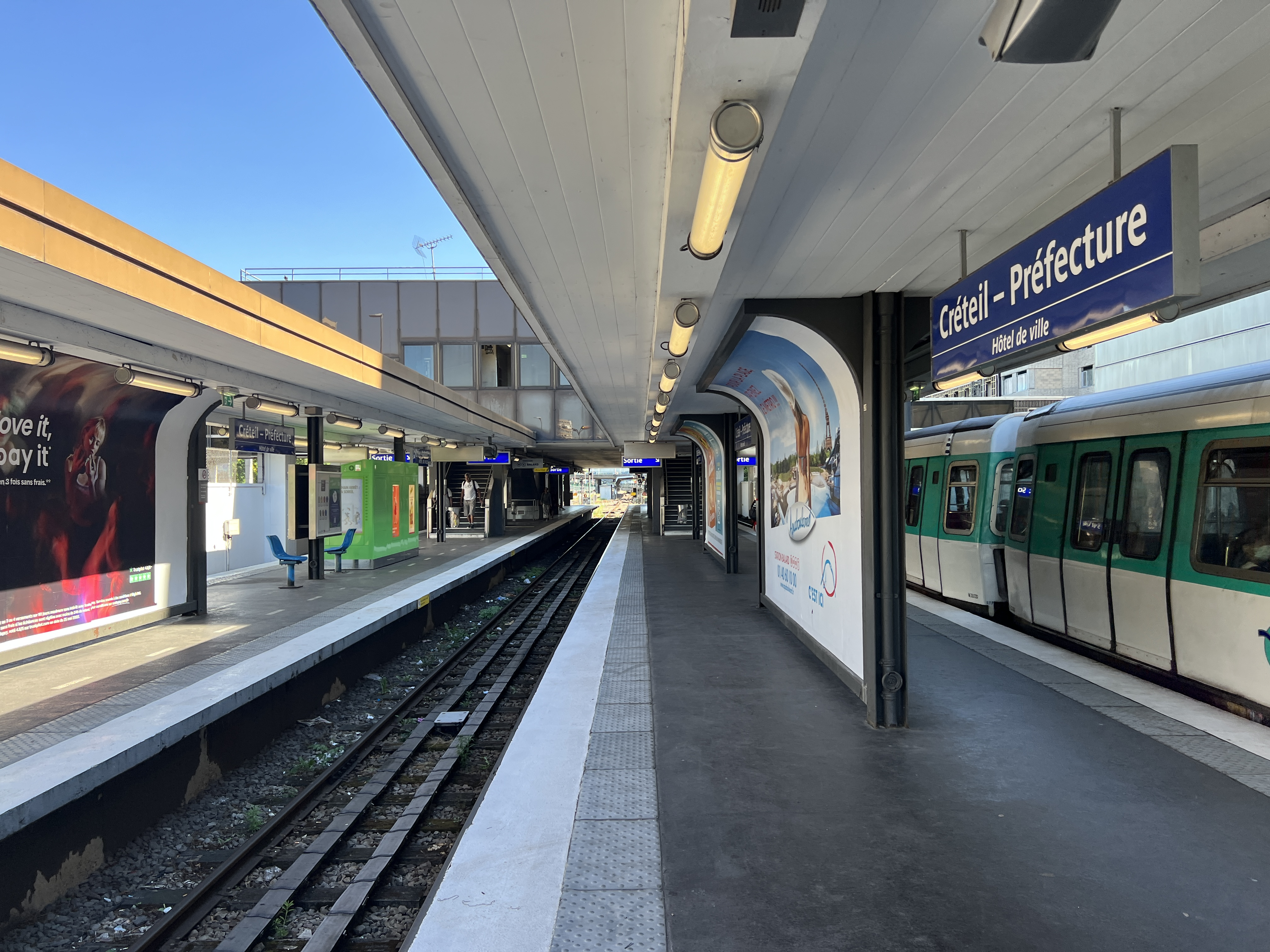
- Créteil–Préfecture station platform

General information
- Location: Créteil; France
- Coordinates: 48°46′47″N 2°27′34″E
- Operator: RATP Group
- Platforms: 2 island platforms
- Tracks: 3
- Connections: RATP Bus: 117 181 281 308; Pays Briard: 23; Seine-et-Marne: 12

Construction
- Structure type: Elevated
- Accessible: No

Other information
- Station code: 2507
- Fare zone: 3

History
- Opened: 10 September 1974

Passengers
- 2021: 3,330,602

Services
Preceding station	Paris Metro	Following station
Créteil–Université towards Balard	Line 8	Pointe du Lac Terminus
Location
- Location within Paris and inner ring

Créteil–Préfecture (French pronunciation: [kʁetɛj pʁefɛktyʁ]; lit. 'Créteil–Prefecture') is an elevated station on Line 8 of the Paris Métro in the suburban commune of Créteil.

Its name refers to the nearby prefecture (administrative headquarters of the department) of the Val-de-Marne.

The 40 hectares (99 acres) Créteil Lake opened nearby in 1970 in place of a former quarry.

== History ==
The station opened on 10 September 1974 as part of the line's extension from Créteil–L'Échat, serving as its eastern terminus until it was further extended 1.3km east to Pointe du Lac on 8 October 2011.

In 2019, the station was used by 4,663,191 passengers, making it the 91st busiest of the Métro network out of 302 stations.

In 2020, the station was used by 2,778,189 passengers amidst the COVID-19 pandemic, making it the 62nd busiest of the Métro network out of 304 stations.

In 2021, the station was used by 3,330,602 passengers, making it the 92nd busiest of the Métro network out of 304 stations.

== Passenger services ==
=== Access ===
The station has 2 accesses:

- Access 1: Préfecture Centre Commercial Créteil–Soleil
- Access 2: avenue du Docteur Paul Casalis Le Mont-Mesly

=== Station layout ===
Platform level	Westbound	← toward Balard (Créteil–Université)
Platform level	Island platform, doors will open on the left
Platform level	Centre track	No regular service
Platform level	Island platform, doors will open on the left
Platform level	Eastbound	toward Pointe du Lac (Terminus) →
1F	Mezzanine
Street level

=== Platforms ===
Créteil–Préfecture is an elevated station with a particular arrangement specific to the stations serving or had served as a terminus. It has three tracks and two island platforms. Only the outer two tracks are in regular use.

== Nearby ==
- Créteil Soleil
- Créteil town hall (Hôtel de Ville)
- Lac de Créteil
- Maison des arts et de la culture de Créteil

== Gallery ==
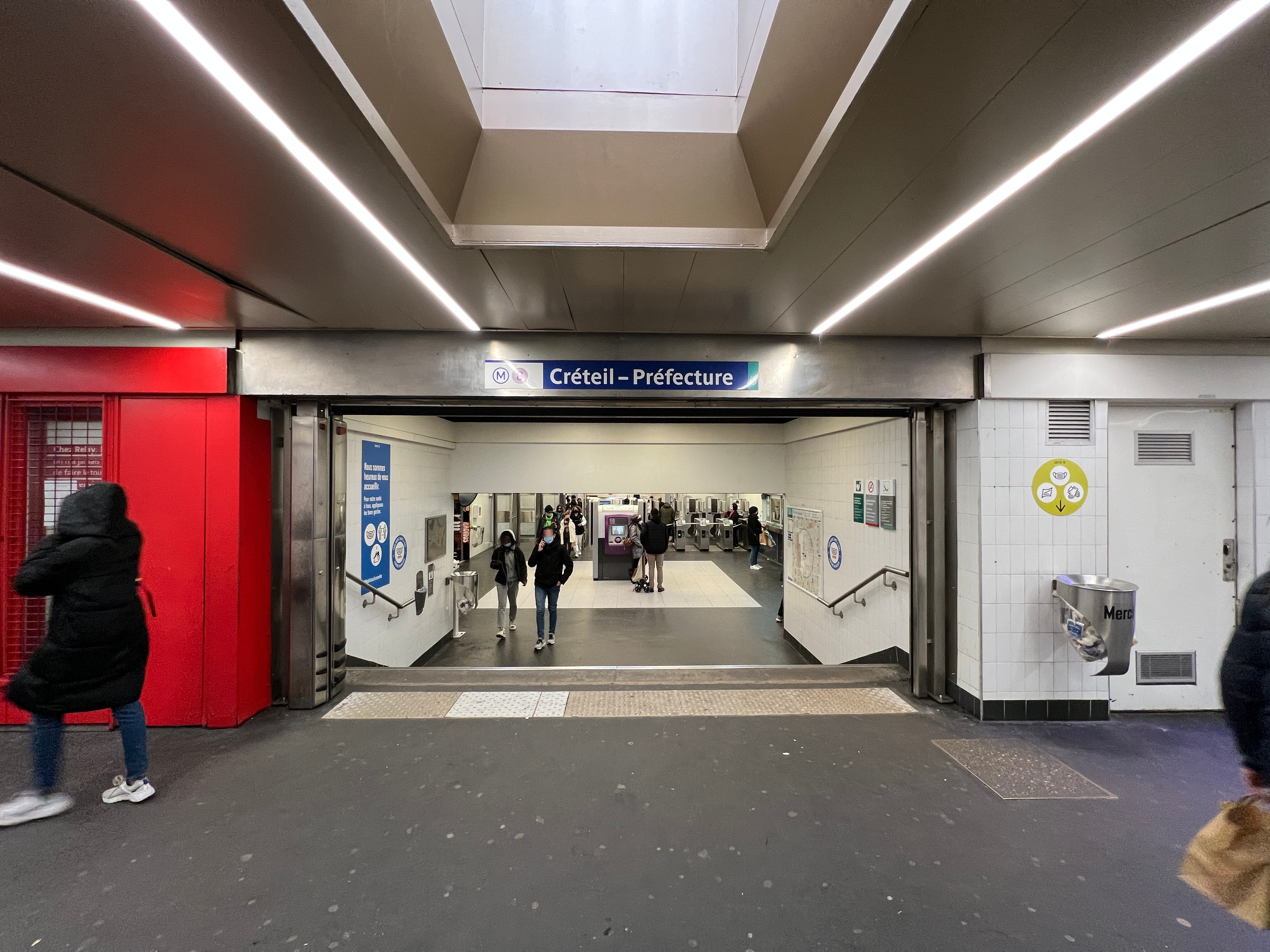
Mezzanine

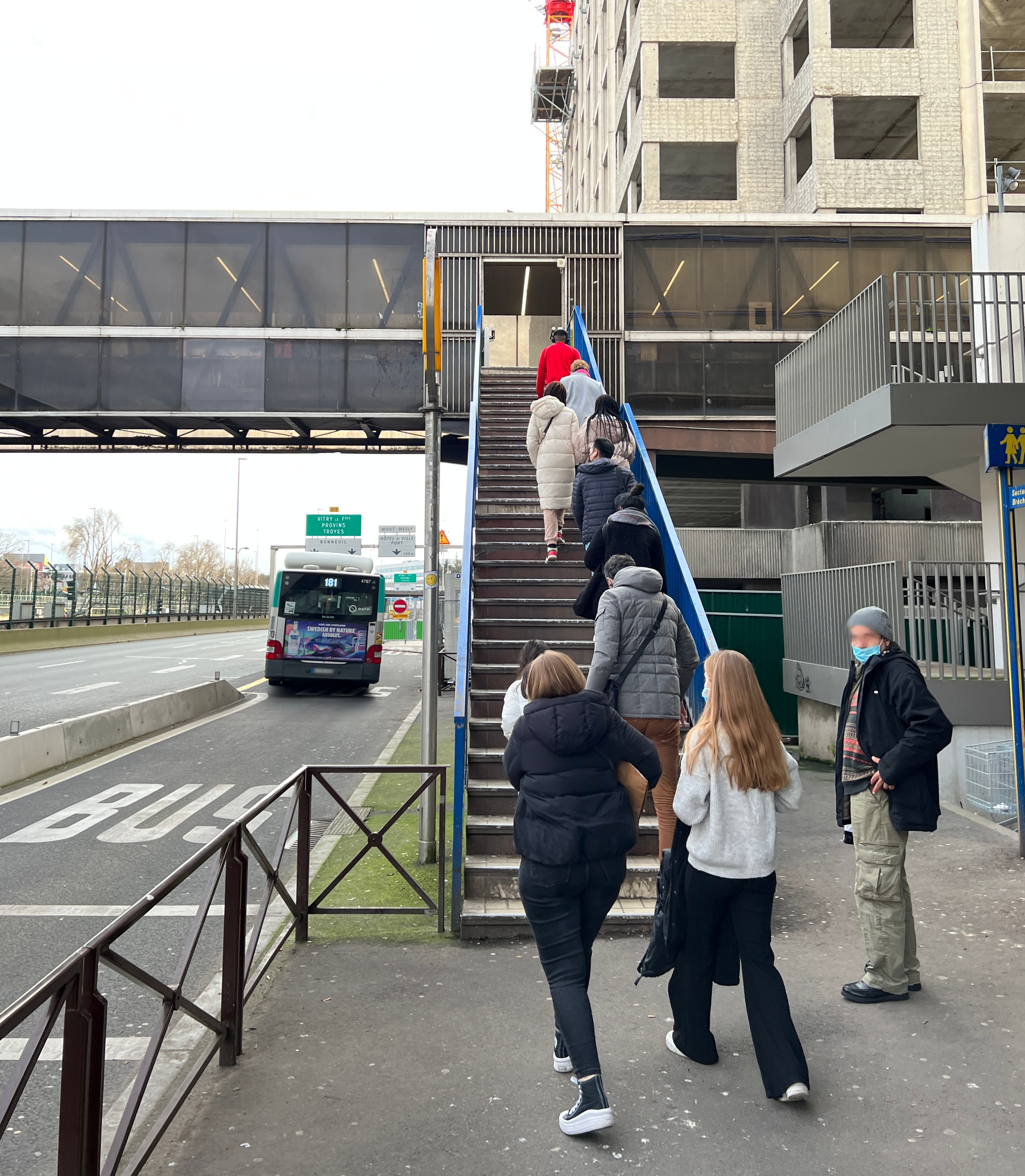
Access 1

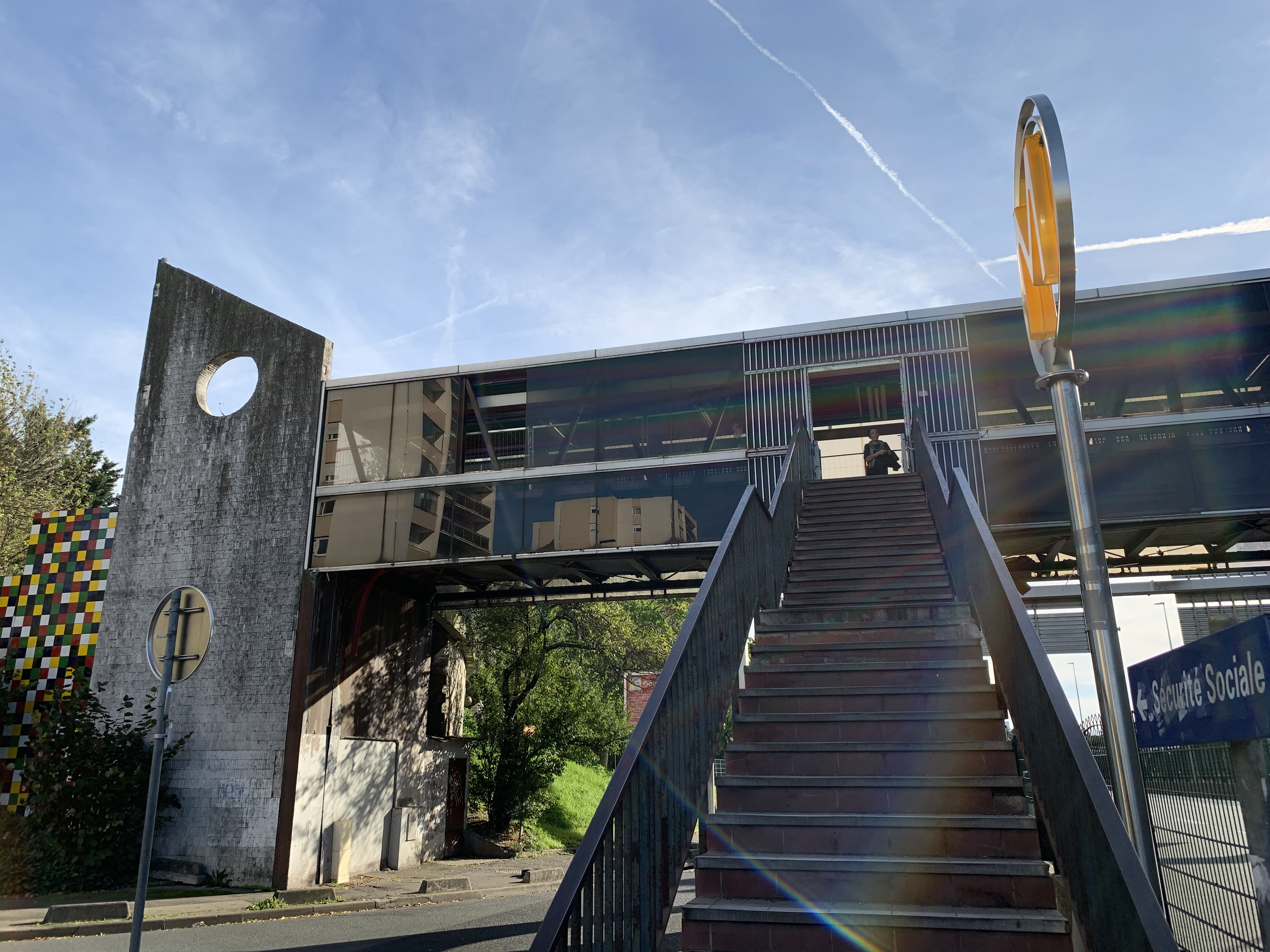
Access 2
