= Câble 1 =

Urban ropeway in France

Île-de-France Cable Car Line 1

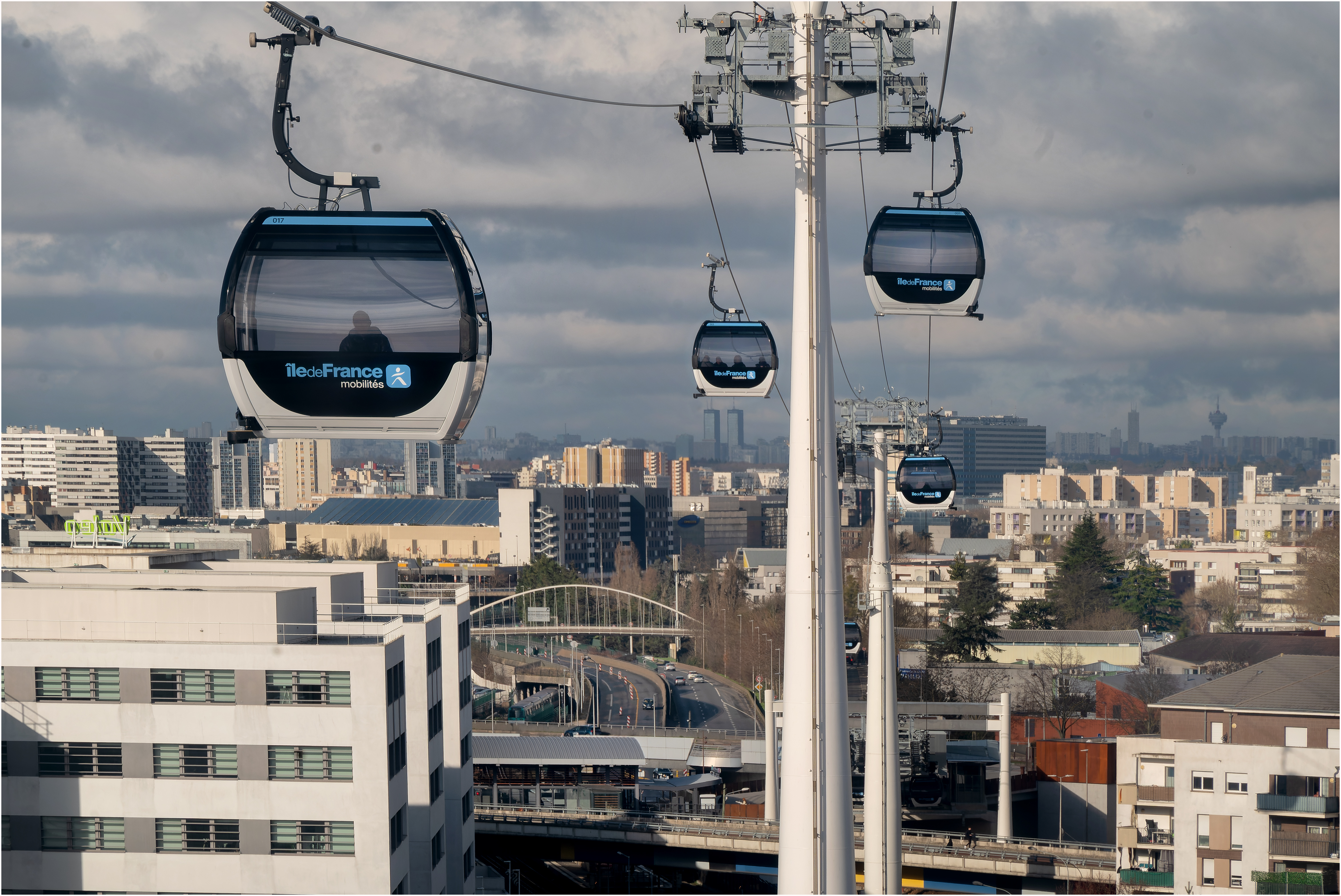
- Câble C1 near Pointe du Lac

Overview
- Owner: Île-de-France Mobilités
- Termini: Créteil - Pointe du Lac; Villeneuve-Saint-Georges - Villa Nova
- Stations: 5

Service
- Type: Cable car
- System: Cable-cars in Île-de-France
- Operator: Transdev
- Rolling stock: 105 Doppelmayr CWA Omega V cabins
- Daily ridership: 12,500 (as of February 2026)

History
- Opened: 13 December 2025

Technical
- Line length: 4.5 km (2.8 mi)
- Operating speed: 30 km/h (19 mph)
Route map

Câble C1, formerly Cable A and Cable A-Téléval, is a cable car in Grand Paris, France, connecting the Pointe du Lac station, the terminus of Paris Métro Line 8 in Créteil, to Villa Nova in Villeneuve-Saint-Georges. It is the first cable car line in the Paris region and the seventh urban cable car in France. Operations began on 13 December 2025. At 4.5 kilometers long, it is the longest urban cable car line in Europe.

== History ==
=== Development ===
City planners considered expanding bus service or constructing a new bridge before choosing to develop a cable car system. An extension of Paris Métro Line 8 into Paris' suburbs had failed to gain support due to the density of existing buildings and higher cost of underground tunnels. A cable car system was chosen due to the hilly terrain of the suburbs. Studio Atelier Schall designed the project's architecture. French transport company Île-de-France Mobilités supported the system's design. Construction was led by Spie Batignolles and Egis Rail. Former Left Party mayor of Limeil-Brévannes Joseph Rossignol proposed the project in 2008.

Construction of the system began in March 2022. Stations names were announced in October 2023.

=== Opening and operations ===
Operations began on 13 December 2025. On 3 February 2026, the line carried its 500,000th passenger.

== Description ==
The system is 4.5 kilometers long, the longest urban cable car line in Europe at time of opening.

=== Route and stations ===
The route contains five stations, Pointe du Lac station, the terminus of Paris Métro Line 8 in Créteil, Limeil-Brévannes, Valenton, La Végétale, and Villa Nova in Villeneuve-Saint-Georges.

Pointe du Lac station is connected by footbridge to the nearby mall. Villa Nova station was designed to maintain views of the surrounding agricultural land.

=== Cabins ===
A total of 105 Omega V-XL cabins are in operation throughout the entire system. In 2019, the cabins won the Red Dot:Best of the Best Design Award in the Product Design category. Each car contains 10 seats and is designed to also accommodate bicycles, strollers, and wheelchairs. Doppelmayr France adapted the design for the Paris cable car.

== Fares ==
The cable has a similar fare system as the Paris bus network. Each station has turnstiles which accept the Navigo card. A Bus-Tram Ticket can be used for a single journey. The ticket does not allow for a free interchange between the Métro network and the cable. Paris Visite, Liberté+, daily, weekly, monthly and yearly passes are also valid for the cable.
