= Hôtel de Ville, Limeil-Brévannes =

Town hall in Limeil-Brévannes, France

Hôtel de Ville
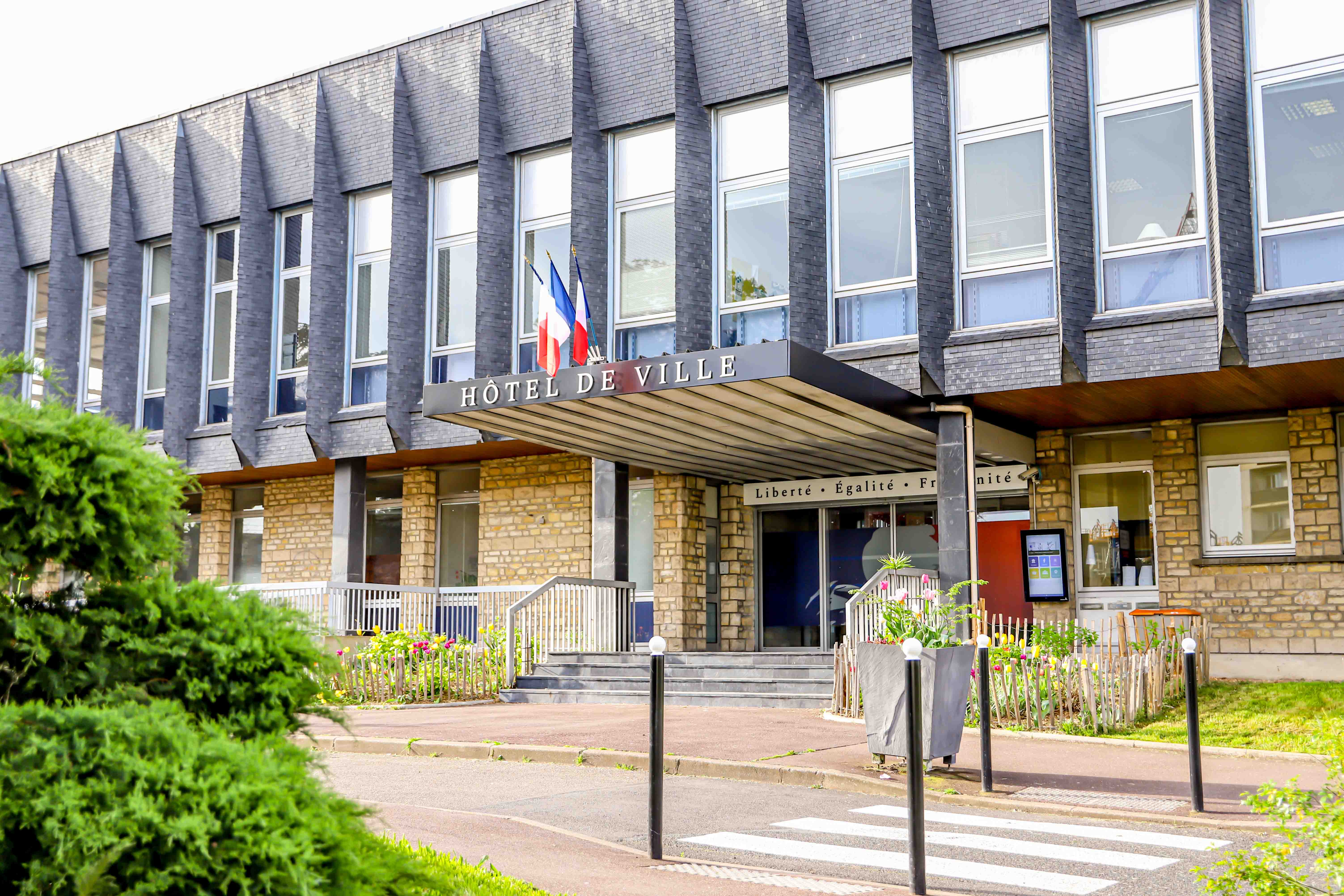
- The main frontage of the Hôtel de Ville in April 2024
- Interactive map of the Hôtel de Ville area

General information
- Type: City hall
- Architectural style: Modern style
- Location: Limeil-Brévannes, France
- Coordinates: 48.7491°N 2.4803°E
- Completed: 1972

The Hôtel de Ville (French pronunciation: [otɛl də vil], City Hall) is a municipal building in Limeil-Brévannes, Val-de-Marne, in the southeastern suburbs of Paris, standing on Place Charles-de-Gaulle.

== History ==
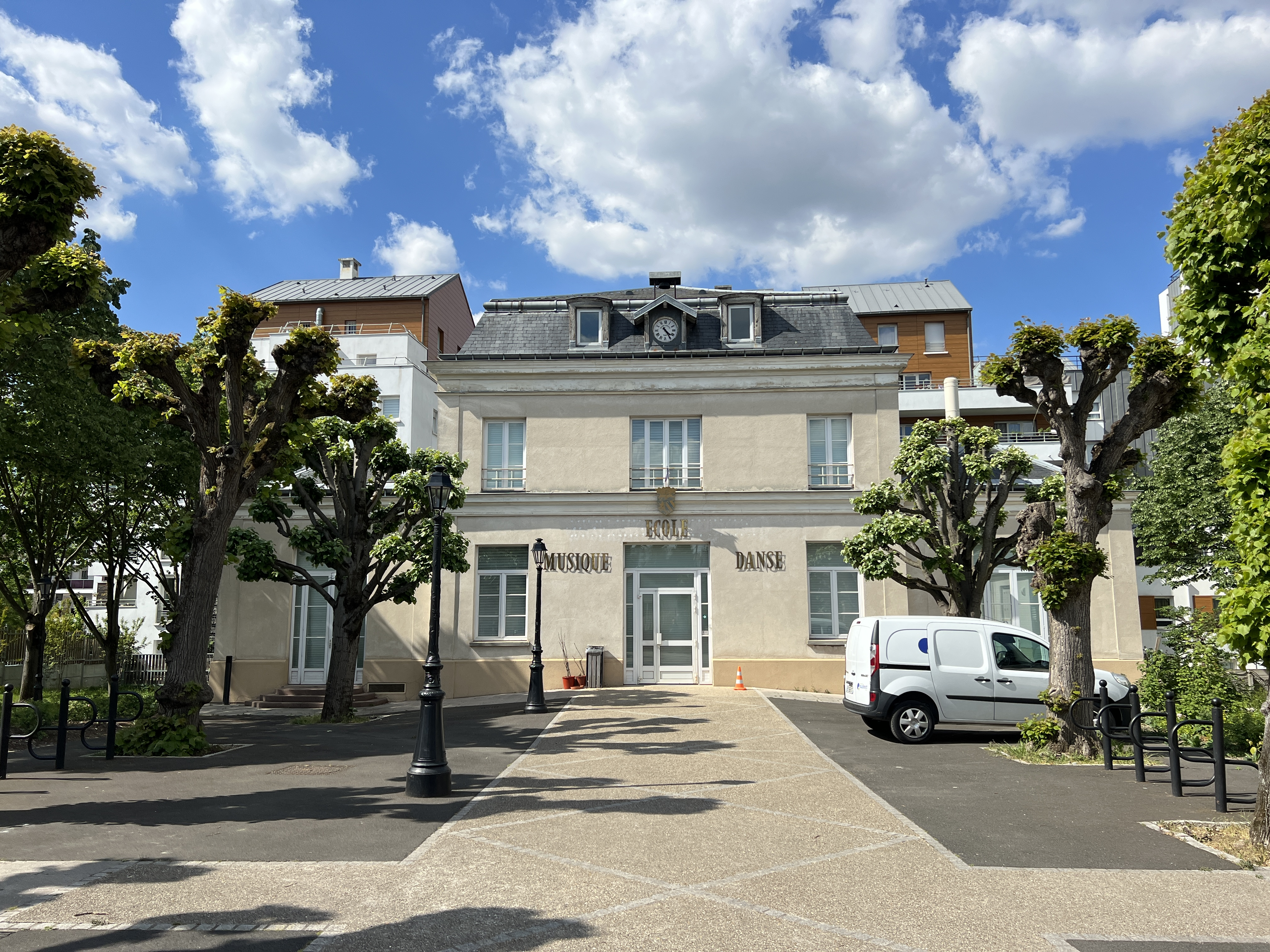
The old town hall

The village of Limeil operated its own town hall under the ancien regime and this continued in use after the French Revolution. However, in the mid-1860s, the council decided to establish a combined town hall and school. The site they selected was on the north side of what is now Rue Pasteur. The building was designed by Sieur Bernard in the neoclassical style, built in ashlar stone and was completed in 1872.

The design involved a symmetrical main frontage of three bays facing onto the street. The central bay featured a square headed doorway on the ground floor, a casement window on the first floor and a small clock at roof level. The other bays were fenestrated in a similar style. After the children relocated to a new school on Avenue d'Alsace et de Lorraine in 1892, the building was exclusively used as a town hall. When the building was no longer required for municipal use, it went on to serve as the Conservatoire de musique, danse et art dramatique (music conservatory).

In the late 1960s, following significant population growth, the council decided to commission a modern town hall. The site they selected was on the corner of Avenue de Verdun and Rue de la Mairie (now Rue Marius Dantz). The building was designed in the modern style, built in brown brick and was completed in January 1972.

The design involved an asymmetrical main frontage facing onto Avenue de Verdun. On the ground floor there was a glass doorway in the centre of the building, and, on the first floor, there was box which was offset to the left of the building, leaving a blind wall on the right. The box, which was jettied out over the payment and supported by square columns, was fenestrated by a row of 18 casement windows set in black cladding. Internally, the principal room was the Salle du Conseil (council chamber).

A memorial to commemorate the life of the former President Charles de Gaulle, in the form of a series of stone columns and a plaque, was unveiled in front of the town hall by the Prime Minister, Michel Debré, on 14 December 1984. The building was badly damaged in an arson attack on the night of 5 November 2025: the council estimated the repairs would cost between €200,000 and €300,000 to complete.
