= Lac de Créteil =

Lake in Créteil, France

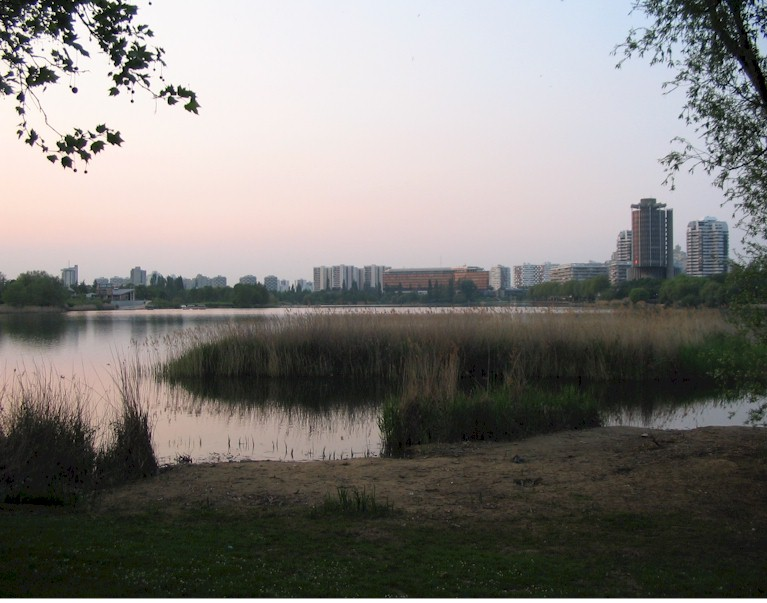

- Location within Paris and inner ring
- Location: Créteil, Paris
- Coordinates: 48.776725°N 2.450809°E
- Type: man made
- Basin countries: France

Lac de Créteil (Créteil Lake in English) is an artificial lake of about 40 hectares located in Créteil (Val-de-Marne), Paris. This is an old quarry converted into a lake in the mid-1970s.

This site is served by Pointe du Lac station on Paris Métro Line 8.

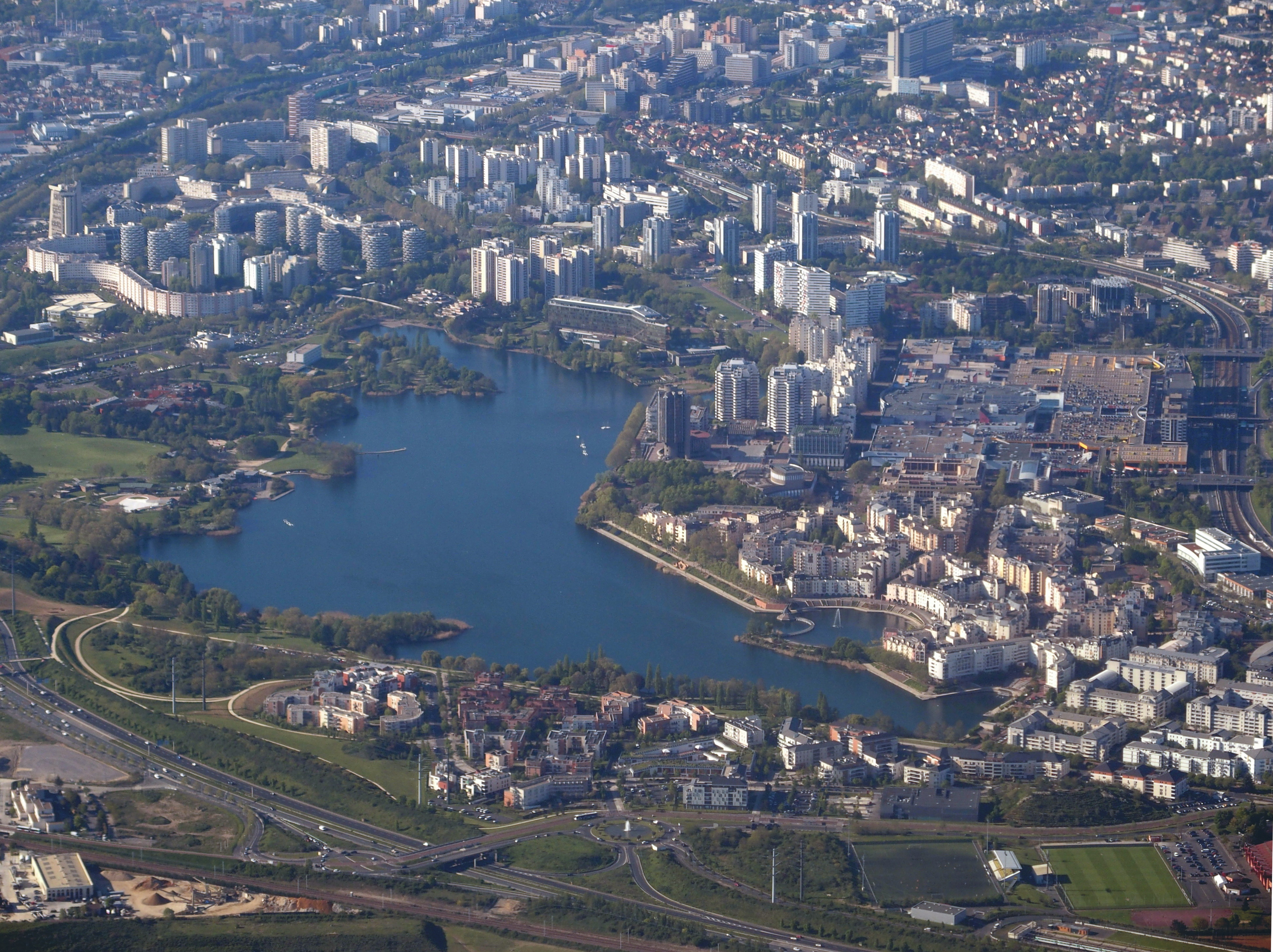
Aerial view of the lake with surrounding housing developments

At the beginning of 1968, the project began. The work of development of the surroundings of the lake lasted until 1988.

Since 2003, the management of the House of Nature has been entrusted to the Nature and Society association.

In 2001, botulism germs were found in corpses of swans and fish, which resulted in the suspension of the authorisation to fish until 2004.
