= Limeil-Brévannes =

- Commune
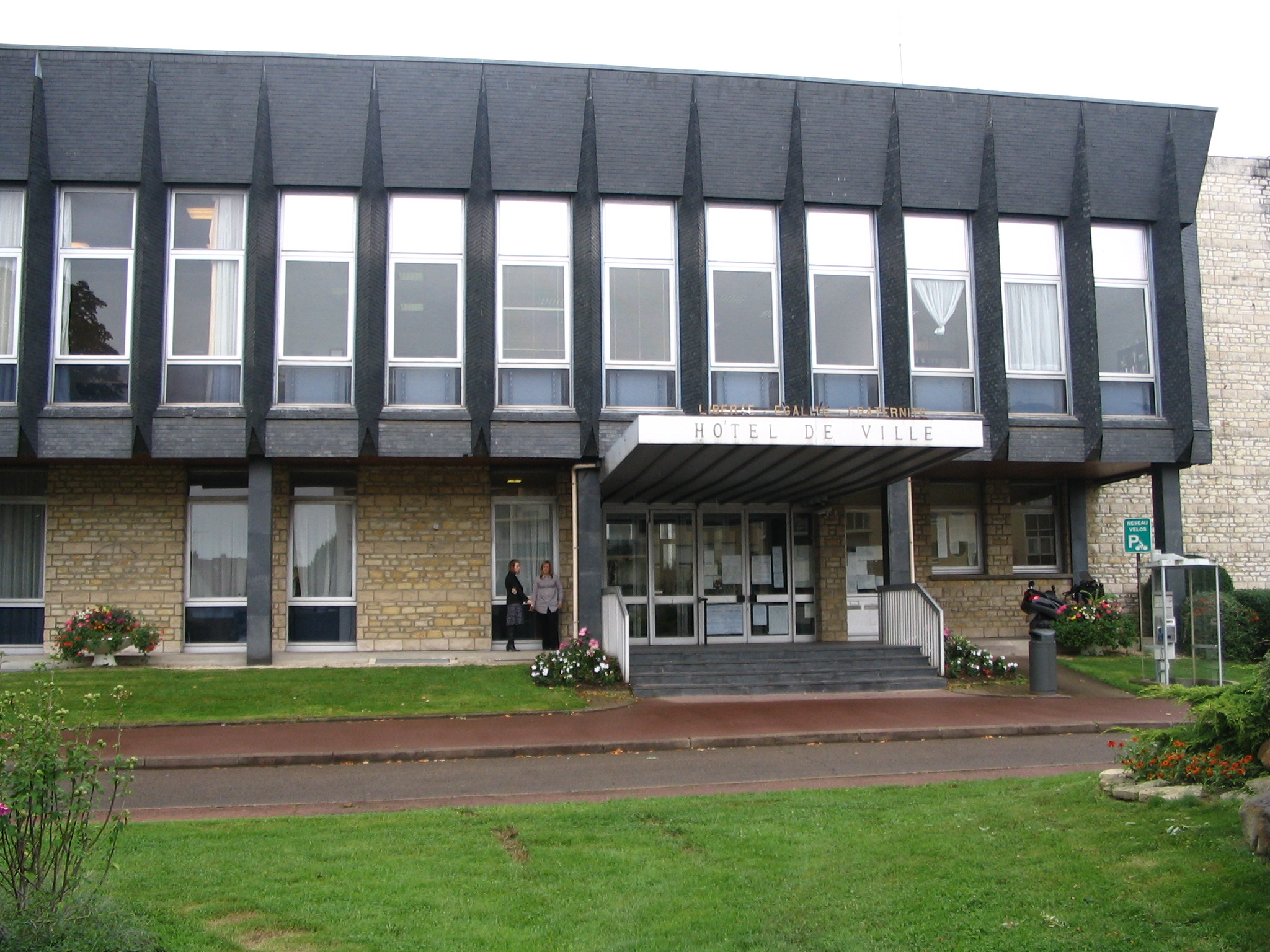
- The Hôtel de Ville

- Coat of arms

- Location (in red) within Paris inner suburbs
- Location of Limeil-Brévannes
- Location within France Location within Île-de-France (region)
- Coordinates: 48°44′47″N 2°29′18″E
- Country: France
- Region: Île-de-France
- Department: Val-de-Marne
- Arrondissement: Créteil
- Canton: Villeneuve-Saint-Georges
- Intercommunality: Grand Paris

Government
  - Mayor (2026–32): Françoise Lecoufle
- Area^{1}: 6.93 km^{2} (2.68 sq mi)
- Population (2023): 27,406
  - Density: 3,950/km^{2} (10,200/sq mi)
- Time zone: UTC+01:00 (CET)
  - Summer (DST): UTC+02:00 (CEST)
- INSEE/Postal code: 94044 /
- ^{1} French Land Register data, which excludes lakes, ponds, glaciers > 1 km^{2} (0.386 sq mi or 247 acres) and river estuaries.

Limeil-Brévannes (French pronunciation: [limɛj bʁevan]) is a commune in the southeastern suburbs of Paris, France. It is located 15.3 km (9.5 mi) from the center of Paris.

== History ==
The name Limeil comes from the Gaulish leoialo, meaning 'elm village.'

Brévannes is thought to be derived from the Gaulish bebros, meaning 'beaver', and the Celtic suffix -onne, meaning 'watercourse'.

The Hôtel de Ville was completed in 1972.

== Geography ==
=== Climate ===
Limeil-Brévannes has an oceanic climate (Köppen climate classification Cfb). The average annual temperature in Limeil-Brévannes is 12.5 °C (54.5 °F). The average annual rainfall is 656.1 mm (25.83 in) with May as the wettest month. The temperatures are highest on average in July, at around 20.8 °C (69.4 °F), and lowest in January, at around 4.9 °C (40.8 °F). The highest temperature ever recorded in Limeil-Brévannes was 41.0 °C (105.8 °F) on 6 August 2003; the coldest temperature ever recorded was −12.0 °C (10.4 °F) on 8 January 2010.

Climate data for Limeil-Brévannes (1991−2020 normals, extremes 1988−2021)
Month	Jan	Feb	Mar	Apr	May	Jun	Jul	Aug	Sep	Oct	Nov	Dec	Year
Record high °C (°F)	16.0 (60.8)	22.0 (71.6)	26.0 (78.8)	28.5 (83.3)	32.5 (90.5)	37.0 (98.6)	40.0 (104.0)	41.0 (105.8)	33.5 (92.3)	29.0 (84.2)	22.0 (71.6)	18.0 (64.4)	41.0 (105.8)
Mean daily maximum °C (°F)	7.7 (45.9)	9.2 (48.6)	13.4 (56.1)	16.8 (62.2)	20.7 (69.3)	24.1 (75.4)	26.5 (79.7)	26.4 (79.5)	22.2 (72.0)	17.0 (62.6)	11.3 (52.3)	8.0 (46.4)	16.9 (62.4)
Daily mean °C (°F)	4.9 (40.8)	5.7 (42.3)	8.8 (47.8)	11.7 (53.1)	15.4 (59.7)	18.7 (65.7)	20.8 (69.4)	20.6 (69.1)	16.8 (62.2)	12.8 (55.0)	8.2 (46.8)	5.3 (41.5)	12.5 (54.5)
Mean daily minimum °C (°F)	2.2 (36.0)	2.2 (36.0)	4.3 (39.7)	6.4 (43.5)	10.1 (50.2)	13.3 (55.9)	15.3 (59.5)	14.8 (58.6)	11.5 (52.7)	8.7 (47.7)	5.1 (41.2)	2.7 (36.9)	8.0 (46.4)
Record low °C (°F)	−12.0 (10.4)	−11.6 (11.1)	−8.0 (17.6)	−3.0 (26.6)	0.0 (32.0)	4.0 (39.2)	7.5 (45.5)	7.0 (44.6)	3.0 (37.4)	−3.5 (25.7)	−9.0 (15.8)	−9.5 (14.9)	−12.0 (10.4)
Average precipitation mm (inches)	49.9 (1.96)	46.3 (1.82)	46.4 (1.83)	48.2 (1.90)	66.7 (2.63)	56.1 (2.21)	55.2 (2.17)	60.0 (2.36)	49.1 (1.93)	56.1 (2.21)	56.6 (2.23)	65.5 (2.58)	656.1 (25.83)
Average precipitation days (≥ 1.0 mm)	11.4	10.4	9.5	9.2	9.8	9.0	7.3	7.7	8.1	10.4	11.2	12.5	116.5
Source: Météo-France

== Population ==
Historical population

Year	Pop.	±% p.a.
1793	295	—
1821	394	+1.04%
1846	423	+0.28%
1872	460	+0.32%
1881	612	+3.22%
1886	1,066	+11.74%
1891	1,458	+6.46%
1896	1,527	+0.93%
1901	1,661	+1.70%
1906	2,621	+9.55%
1911	3,504	+5.98%
1921	4,391	+2.28%
1926	4,934	+2.36%
1931	5,821	+3.36%

Year	Pop.	±% p.a.
1936	5,865	+0.15%
1946	6,717	+1.37%
1954	7,547	+1.47%
1962	8,377	+1.31%
1968	11,456	+5.36%
1975	16,496	+5.35%
1982	16,566	+0.06%
1990	16,070	−0.38%
1999	17,529	+0.97%
2007	18,657	+0.78%
2012	21,103	+2.49%
2017	27,228	+5.23%
2023	27,406	+0.11%

Source: EHESS and INSEE (1968-2023)

== Transport ==
Limeil-Brévannes is served by no station of the Paris Métro, RER, or suburban rail network. The closest station to Limeil-Brévannes is Boissy-Saint-Léger station on Paris RER line A. This station is located in the neighboring commune of Boissy-Saint-Léger, 1.7 km (1.1 mi) from the town center of Limeil-Brévannes.

== Education ==
Public primary schools in the commune include 8 preschools/nursery schools (maternelles) and 6 elementary schools, making a total of 13 schools.

- Preschools: Anatole France, André Malraux, Henri Wallon, Jacques Prévert, Jean-Louis Marquèze, Paul Langevin, Pierre Curie, Rosa Luxemburg
- Elementaries: Anatole France, Pablo Picasso, Martine Soulié, Louis Pasteur, Piard, Jean-Louis Marquèze

Public secondary schools:

- Two junior high schools: Collège Daniel Féry and Collège Janusz Korczak
- Lycée Guillaume Budé (senior high school/sixth-form college)

== See also ==
- Communes of the Val-de-Marne department
- Ommic SAS
