= Pointe du Lac station =

Metro station in Créteil, France

Pointe du Lac
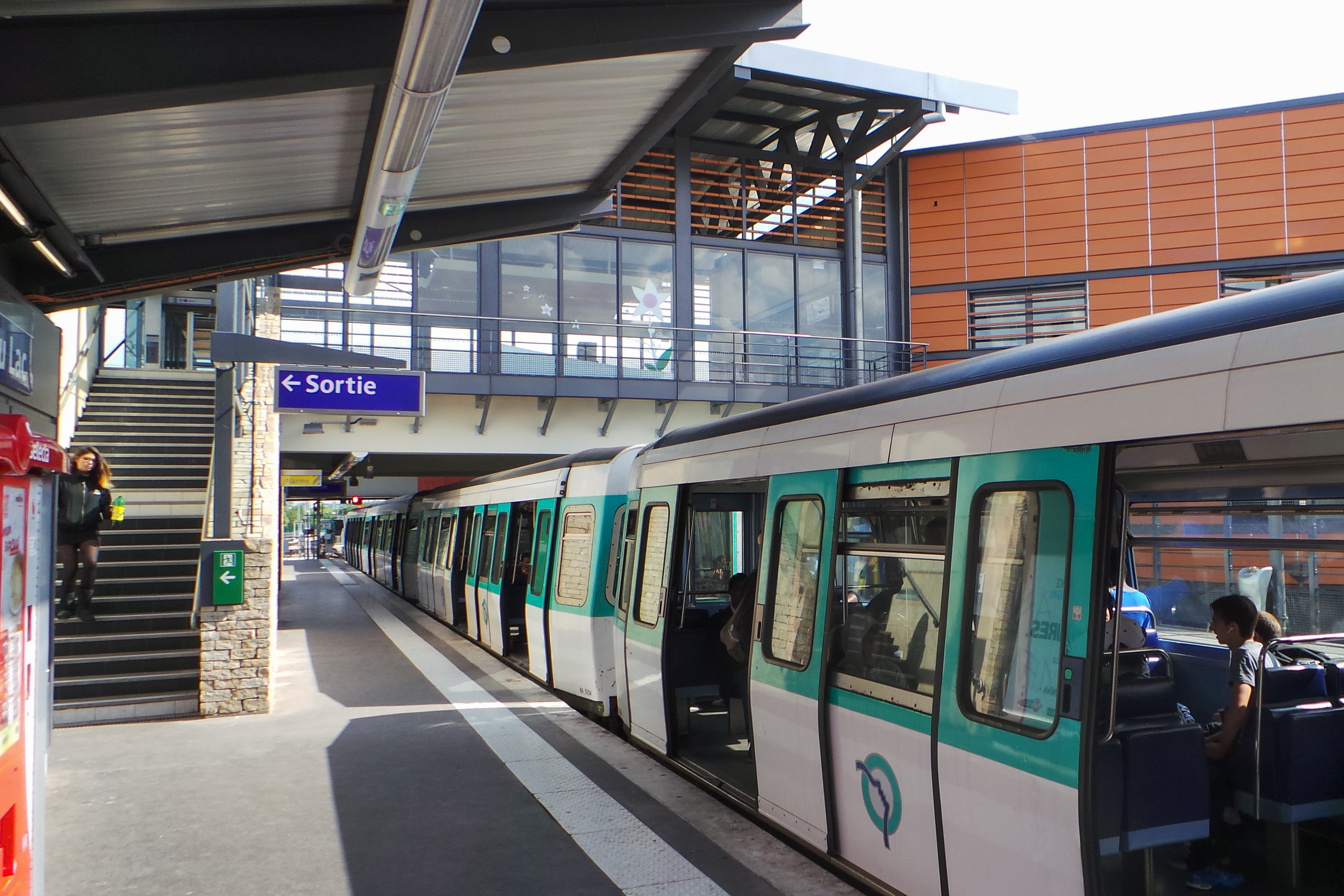
- Pointe du Lac station platform

General information
- Location: Créteil; France
- Coordinates: 48°46′08″N 2°27′53″E
- Operator: RATP Group
- Platforms: 1 island platform, 1 side platform
- Tracks: 3
- Connections: RATP Bus: 117 393; SETRA: 23; STRAV: K

Construction
- Structure type: At-grade
- Cycle facilities: Covered racks
- Accessible: Yes

Other information
- Station code: PTL
- Fare zone: 3

History
- Opened: 8 October 2011

Passengers
- 2020: 1,684,557

Services
Preceding station	Paris Metro	Following station
Créteil–Préfecture towards Balard	Line 8	Terminus
Preceding station	Cable car	Following station
Terminus	Câble 1	Limeil-Brévannes towards Villa Nova
Location
- Location within Paris and inner ring

Pointe du Lac (French pronunciation: [pwɛ̃t dy lak]; lit. 'Tip of the Lake'; also Créteil–Pointe du Lac) is a station on Line 8 of the Paris Métro in the suburban commune of Créteil. It is the eastern terminus of the line.

== History ==
It opened on 8 October 2011 as part of a 1.3-kilometre (0.81 mi) extension from Créteil–Préfecture, with construction having started in 2007. It was the easternmost station until the opening of Rosny-Bois-Perrier in 2024, and also the southernmost one until Aéroport d'Orly opened in the same year. It is situated to the southeast of Créteil Lake. It is currently the second-newest above-ground station on the Paris Métro, behind Coteaux Beauclair on Line 11.

In 2019, the station was used by 2,849,288 passengers making it the 186th busiest of the Métro network, out of 302 stations.

In 2020, the station was used by 1,684,557 passengers amidst the COVID-19 pandemic, making it the 150th busiest of the Métro network out of 305 stations.

In 2025, Câble 1 was opened, connecting Pointe du Lac station to Bois Matar in Villeneuve-Saint-Georges, in the Val-de-Marne region of the Grand Paris region.

== Passenger services ==
=== Access ===
The station has a single entrance along a bus-only lane.

=== Station layout ===
Pointe du Lac is an elevated station with a particular arrangement specific to the stations serving or had served as a terminus. It has three tracks and two platforms. The side platform serves as the arrival platform, while the island platform serves as the departure platform for services towards Balard. The arrival platform, due to it being the terminus of the line, does not have an awning over it, a unique case for an elevated station on the network. Orange "Akiko" style seats are installed on the island departure platform.

Street level	Mezzanine
Platform level	Westbound	← toward Balard (Créteil–Préfecture)
Platform level	Island platform, doors will open on the left or right
Platform level	Westbound	← toward Balard (Créteil–Préfecture)
Platform level	Eastbound	Alighting passengers only →
Platform level	Side platform, doors will open on the right

== Gallery ==
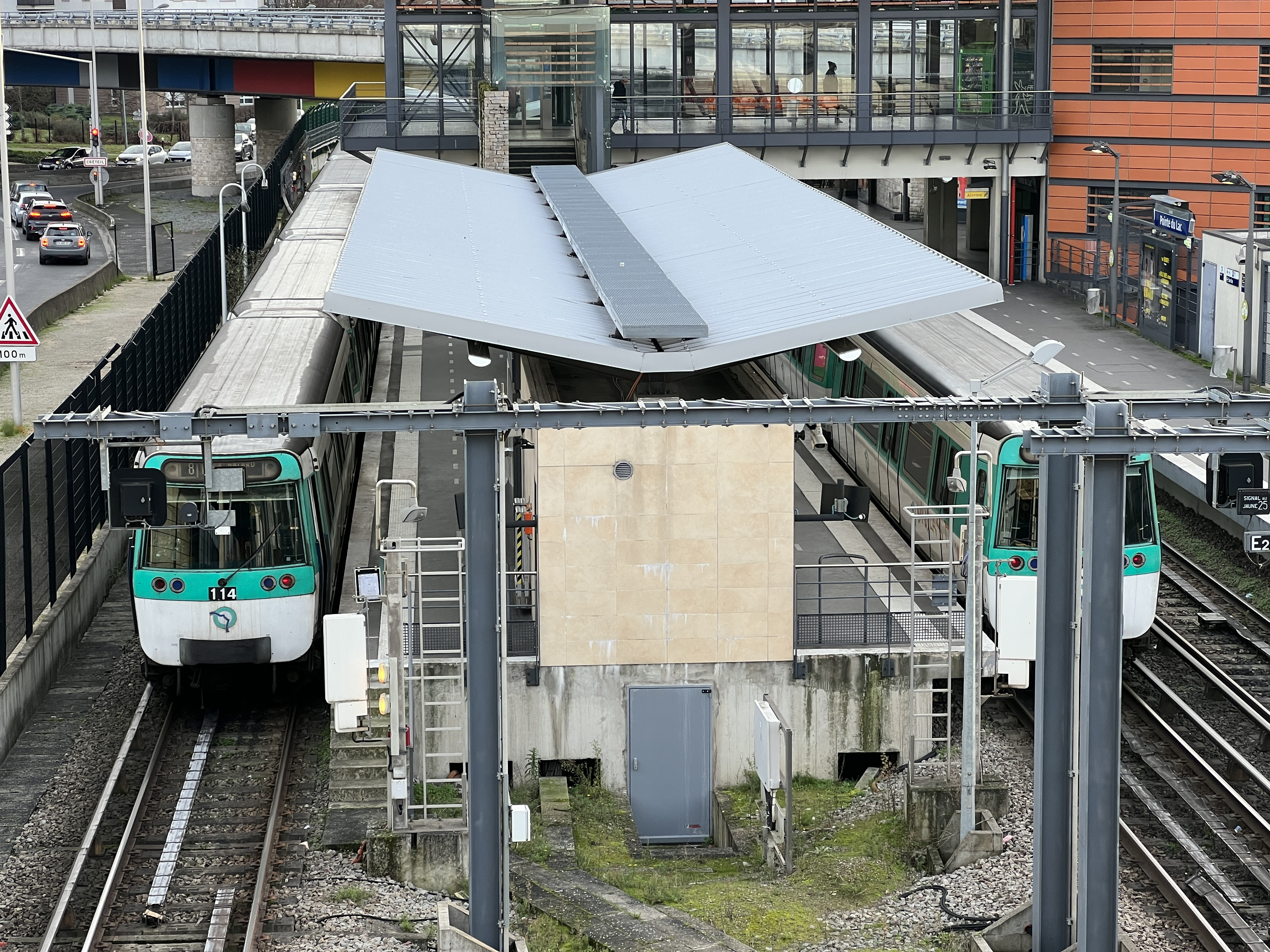
2 MF 77 trains at the island platform

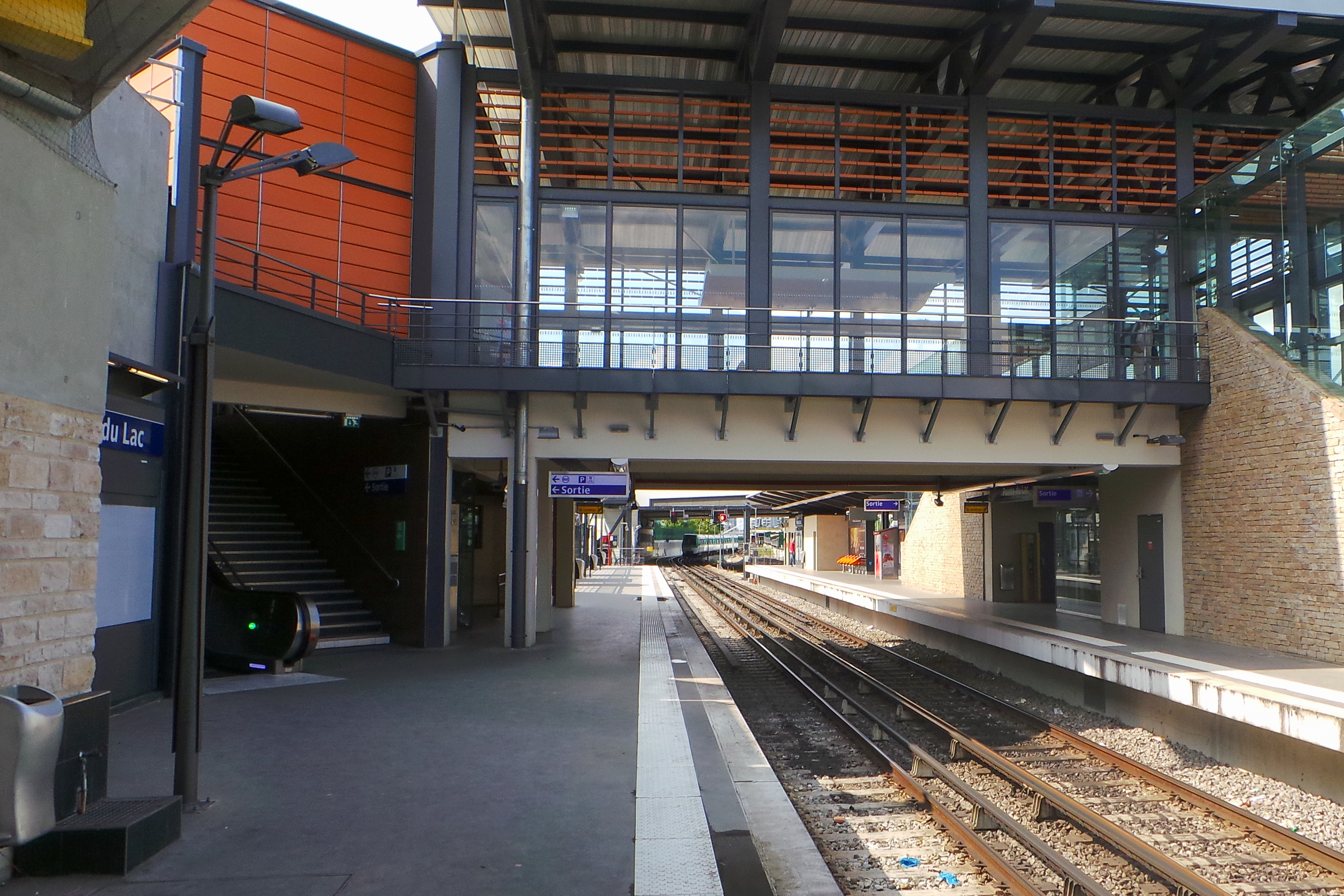
Platforms

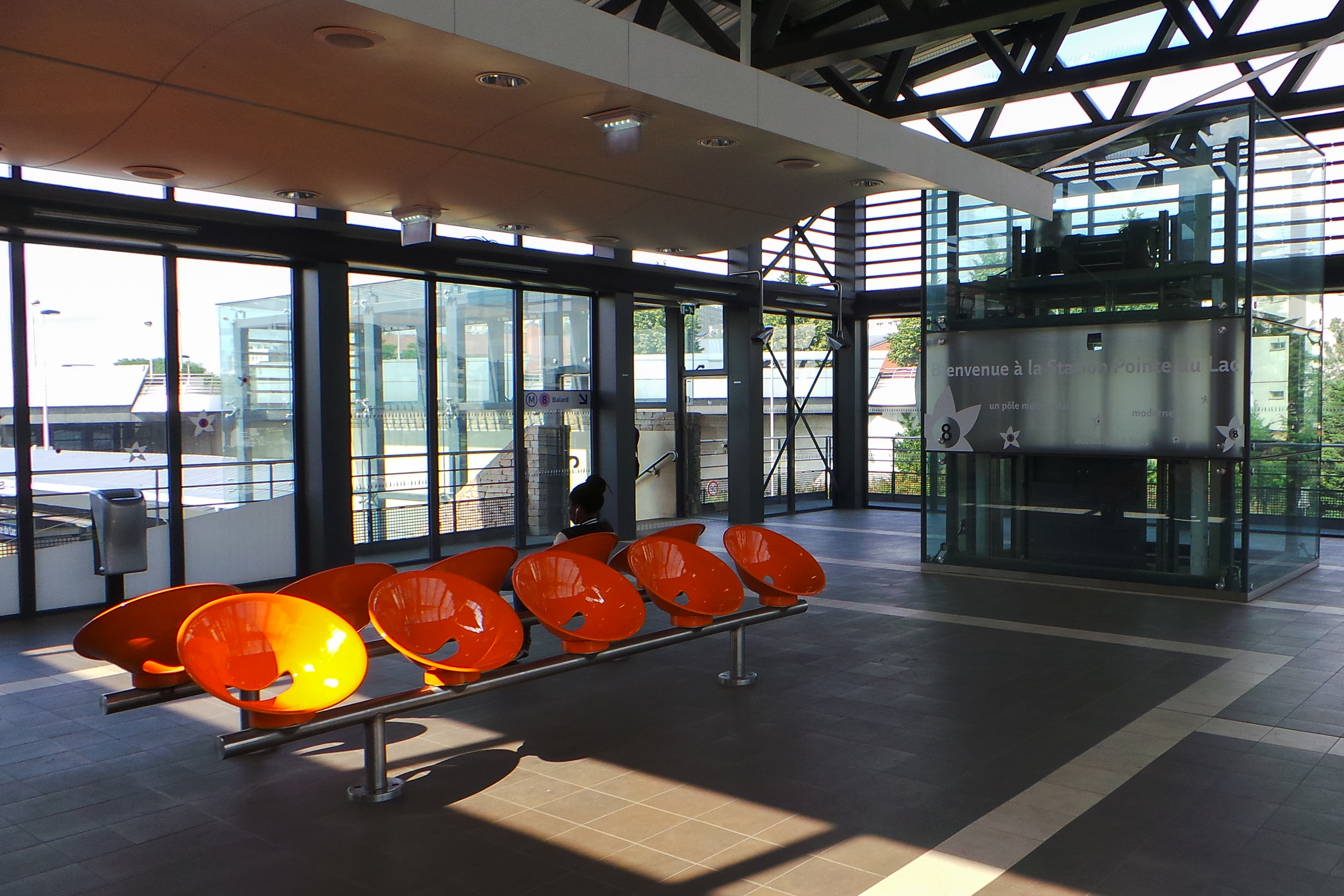
Mezzanine level

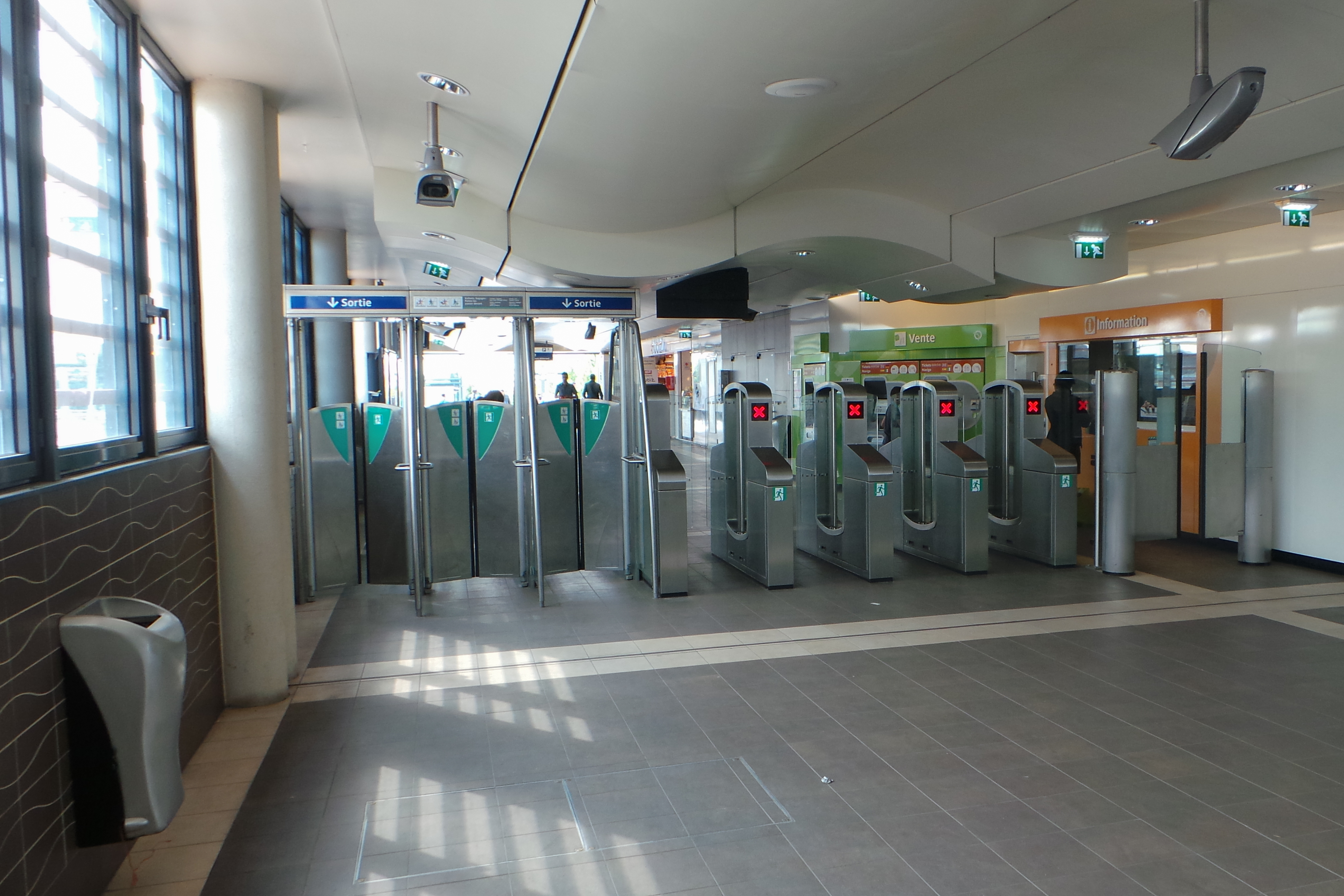
Ticketing hall

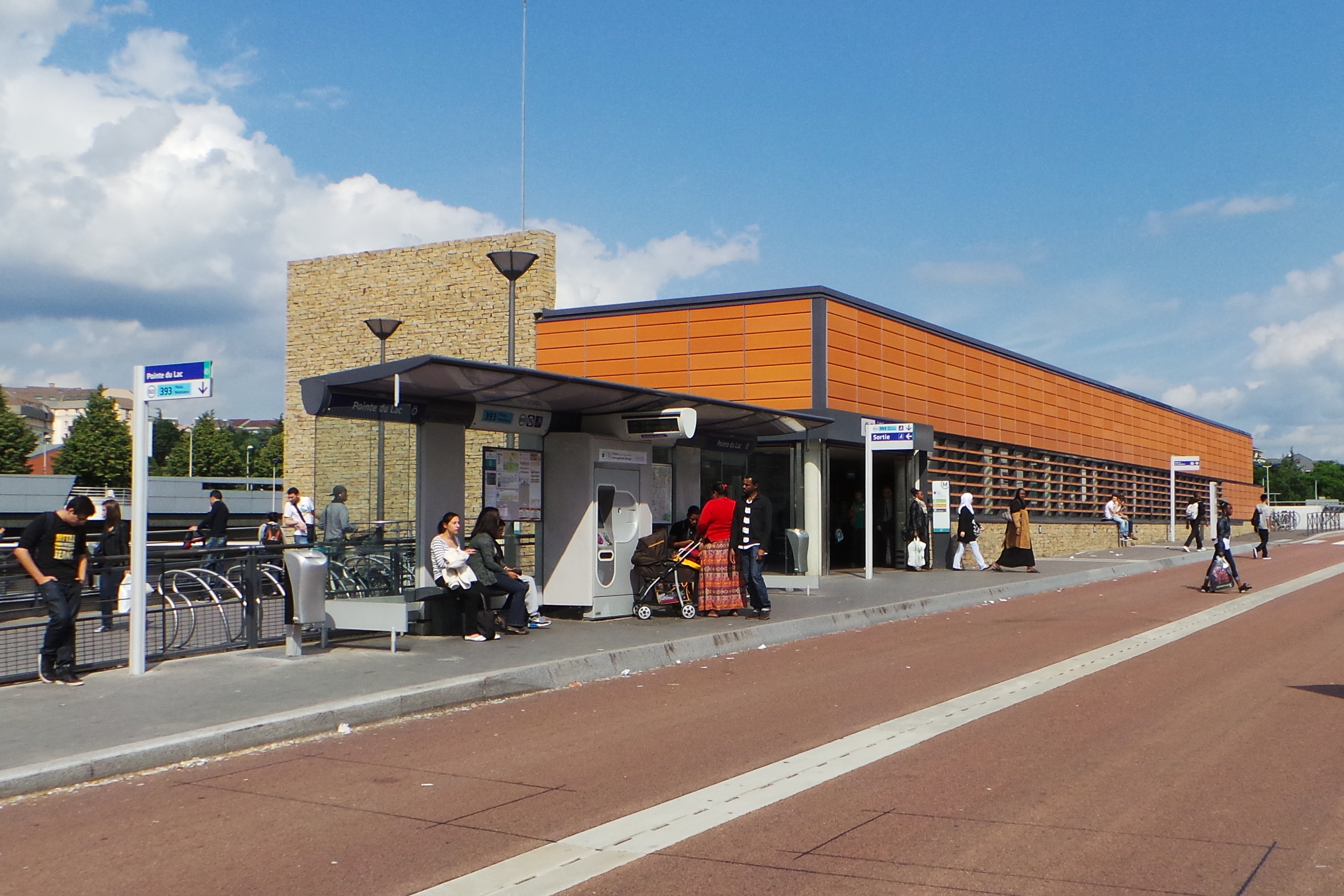
Entrance of Pointe du Lac along the bus-only lane
