= Porte Dorée =

Porte Doree may refer to:

- Palais de la Porte Dorée, an exhibit hall located on the edge of the Bois de Vincennes at 293, avenue Daumesnil, XIIe arrondissement, Paris
- Porte Dorée station, a station on Line 8 of the Paris Metro
