= Dugommier =

Dugommier may refer to:

- Dugommier station, a Paris Metro station in Paris, France
- Jacques François Dugommier (1738–1794), French general
