= Reuilly–Diderot station =

Metro station in Paris, France

Reuilly–Diderot
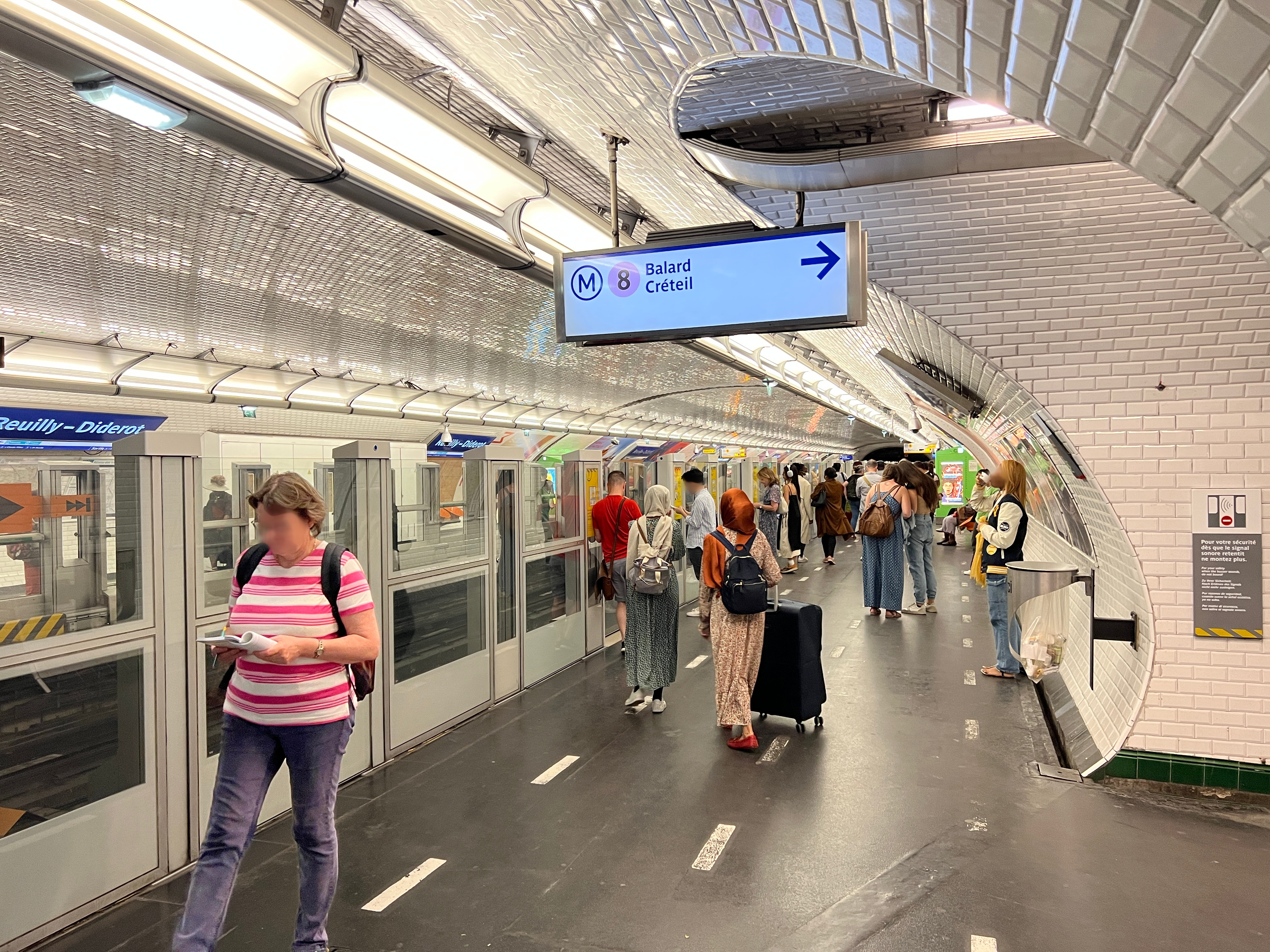
- Line 1's platforms after the installation of platform screen doors

General information
- Location: 73, Boul. Diderot; 90, Boul. Diderot; 116, Boul. Diderot; 118, Boul. Diderot; 12th arrondissement of Paris; Île-de-France; France
- Coordinates: 48°50′49″N 2°23′11″E
- Owner: RATP
- Operator: RATP
- Line: Paris Metro Paris Metro Line 1 Paris Metro Line 8
- Platforms: 4 (side platforms)
- Tracks: 4

Construction
- Accessible: No

Other information
- Station code: 12-02
- Fare zone: 1

History
- Opened: 20 August 1900 (Line 1); 5 May 1931 (Line 8)
- Former names: Rue de Reuilly (20 August 1900 – 5 May 1931)

Passengers
- 4,580,091 (2021)

Services
Preceding station	Paris Metro	Following station
Gare de Lyon towards La Défense	Line 1	Nation towards Château de Vincennes
Faidherbe–Chaligny towards Balard	Line 8	Montgallet towards Pointe du Lac
Route map
Line 1
Line 8
Location
- Location within Paris

Reuilly–Diderot (French pronunciation: [ʁœji didʁo]) is a station on Lines 1 and 8 of the Paris Métro in the 12th arrondissement.

== History ==
The station opened as Reuilly 13 August 1900, a month after trains began running on the initial section of line 1 between Porte de Vincennes and Porte Maillot on 19 July 1900. Until then, the trains passed through without stopping. It was then named after the nearby rue Reuilly as it once led to the Château de Reuilly, a now destroyed former palace located in the old town of Reuilly – now part of the 12th arrondissement.

On 5 May 1931, line 8's platforms opened as part of its extension from Richelieu–Drouot to Porte de Charenton. The station was subsequently renamed Reuilly–Diderot, its current name. Diderot referred to the nearby Boulevard Diderot, which in turn was renamed in 1879 after Denis Diderot (1713-1784), a prominent writer and philosopher during the Age of Enlightenment.

In the 1930s, the platforms of line 1 were extended to 105 metres to cater for 7-car trains, a plan which ultimately did not materialise.

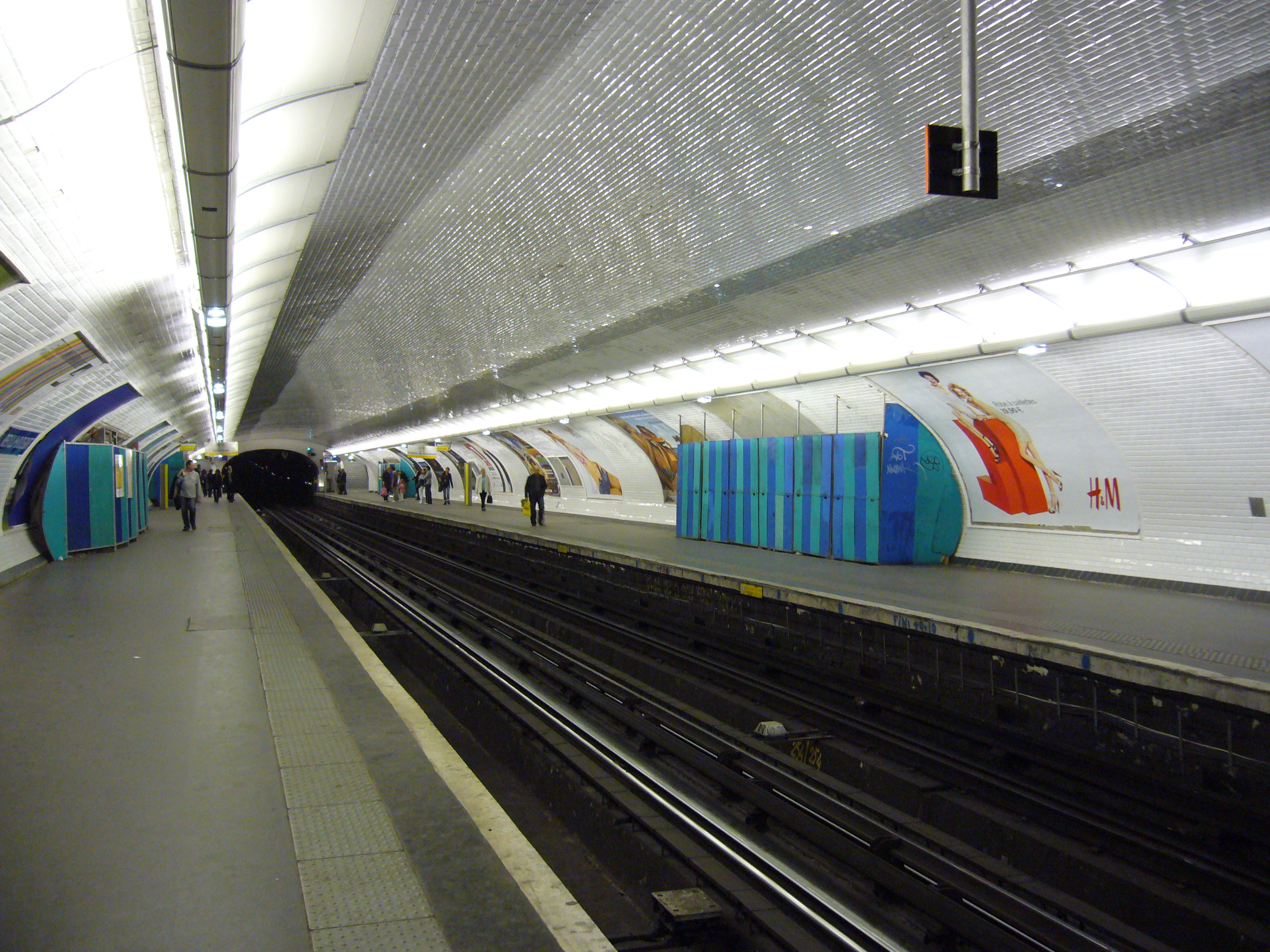
Line 1's platforms before the installation of platform screen doors

As part of the "Un métro + beau" programme by the RATP, the station's corridors and platform lighting were renovated and modernised on 31 March 2008. The platforms of line 1 were closed to raise its platform levels over the weekend of 31 May to 1 June 2008 as part of its automation. This was for the installation platform screen doors to improve passenger safety and for automation, which were done in March 2011. The line was fully automated in December 2012.

In 2019, the station was used by 6,328,040 passengers, making it the 52nd busiest of the Métro network out of 302 stations.

In 2020, the station was used by 3,860,750 passengers amidst the COVID-19 pandemic, making it the 30th busiest of the Métro network out of 304 stations.

In 2021, the station was used by 4,580,091 passengers, making it the 44th busiest of the Métro network out of 304 stations.

== Passenger services ==
=== Access ===
The station has four accesses:

- Access 1: Boulevard Diderot
- Access 2: rue Claude Tillier
- Access 3: rue de Reuilly
- Access 4: rue de Chaligny

=== Station layout ===
Street level
B1	Mezzanine
Line 1 platforms	Side platform with PSDs, doors will open on the right
Line 1 platforms	Westbound	← toward La Défense–Grande Arche (Gare de Lyon)
Line 1 platforms	Eastbound	toward Château de Vincennes (Nation) →
Line 1 platforms	Side platform with PSDs, doors will open on the right
Line 8 platforms	Side platform, doors will open on the right
Line 8 platforms	Northbound	← toward Balard (Faidherbe–Chaligny)
Line 8 platforms	Southbound	toward Pointe du Lac (Montgallet) →
Line 8 platforms	Side platform, doors will open on the right

=== Platforms ===
Both lines have a standard configuration with two tracks surrounded by two side platforms, although line 1's platforms have had platform screen doors installed since March 2011. Line 8's platforms are curved and the increased height of its vault along with the lower portion of its side walls being vertical instead of elliptical distinguishes it from the other stations on the line.

=== Other connections ===
The station is also served by lines 46, 57, and 215 of the RATP bus network, and at night, by line N11 of the Noctilien bus network.

== Nearby ==
- Caserne de Reuilly
- Jardin Martha-Desrumaux
- Hôpital Saint-Antoine

== Gallery ==
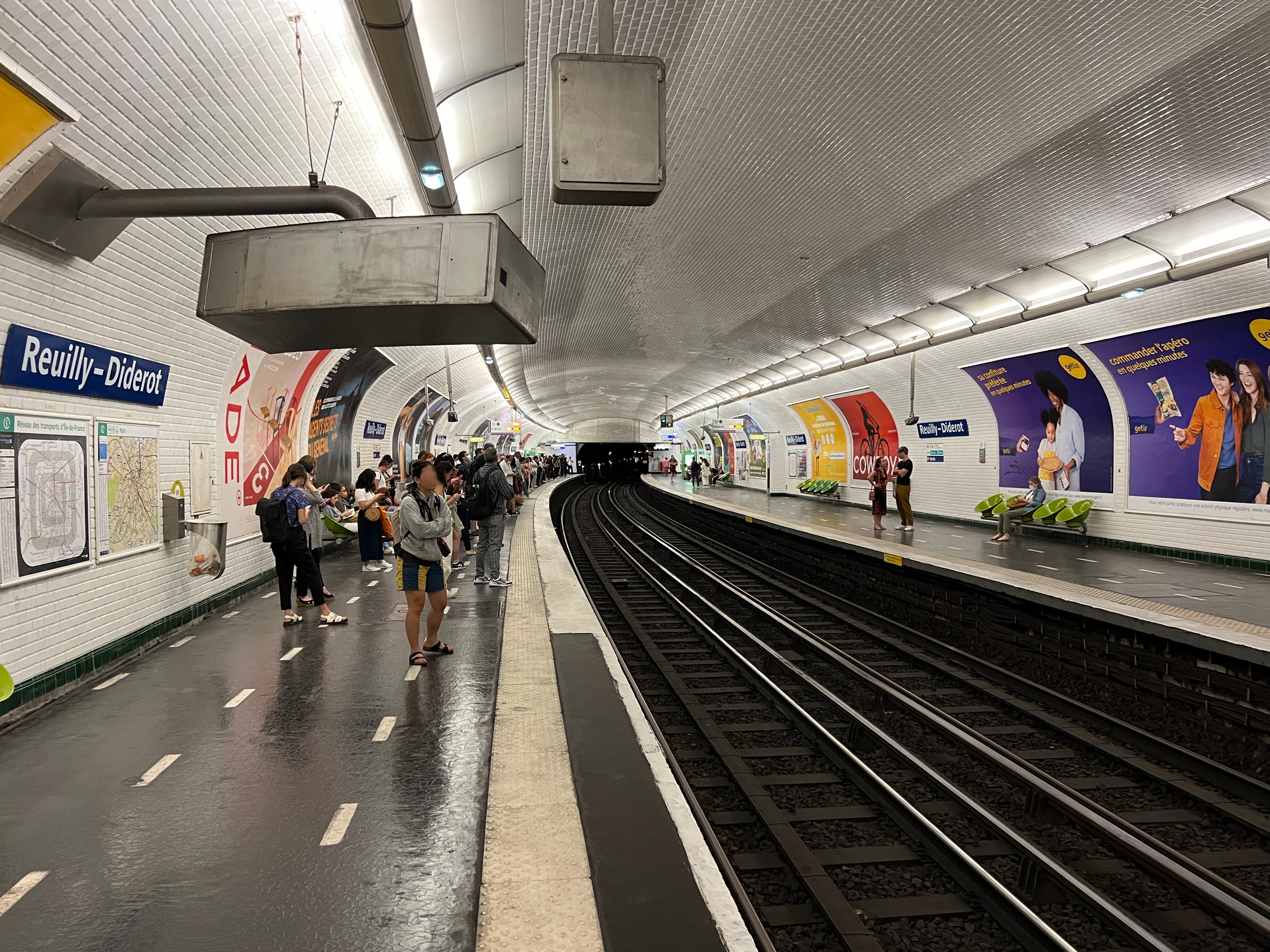
Line 8's curved platforms

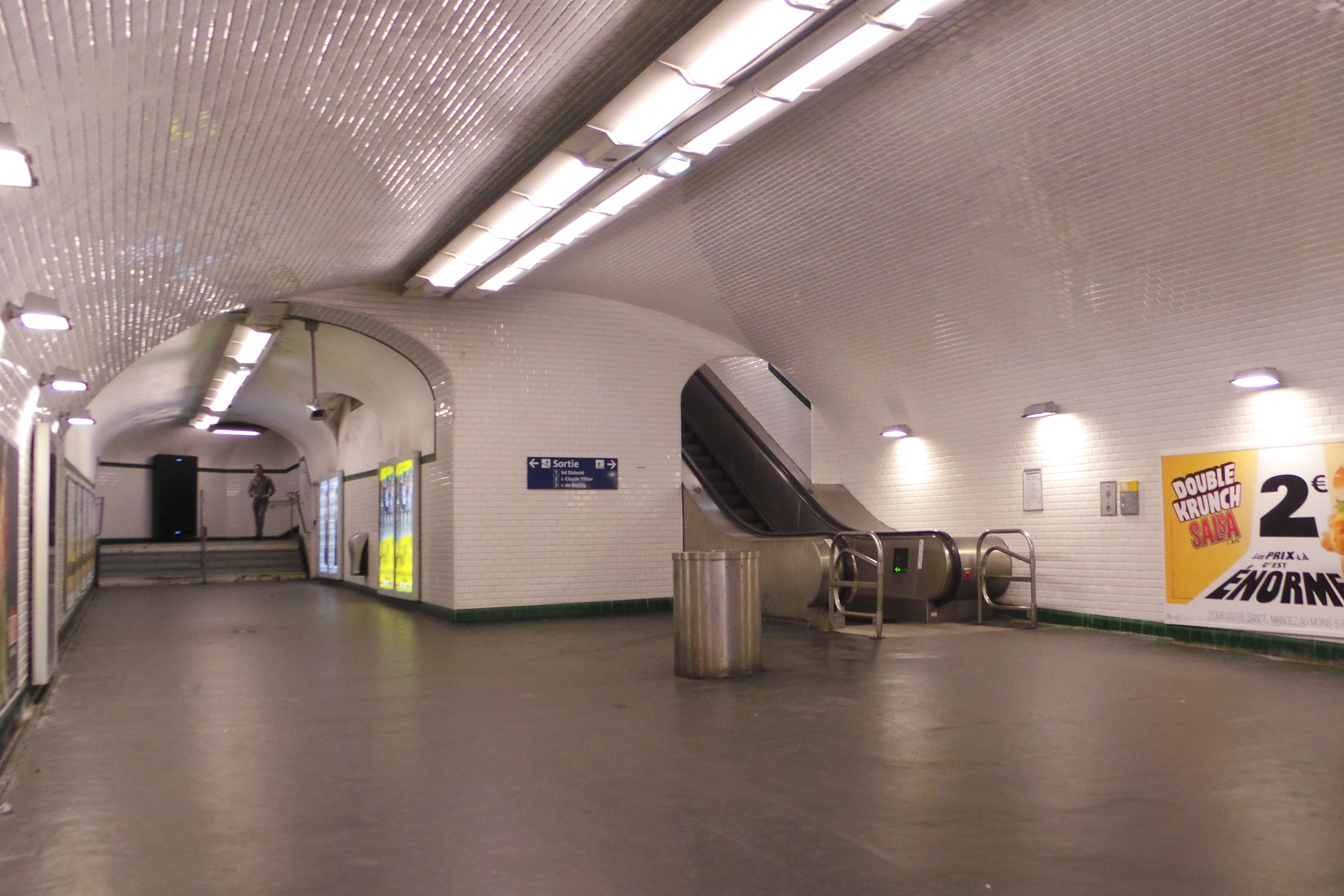
Mezzanine

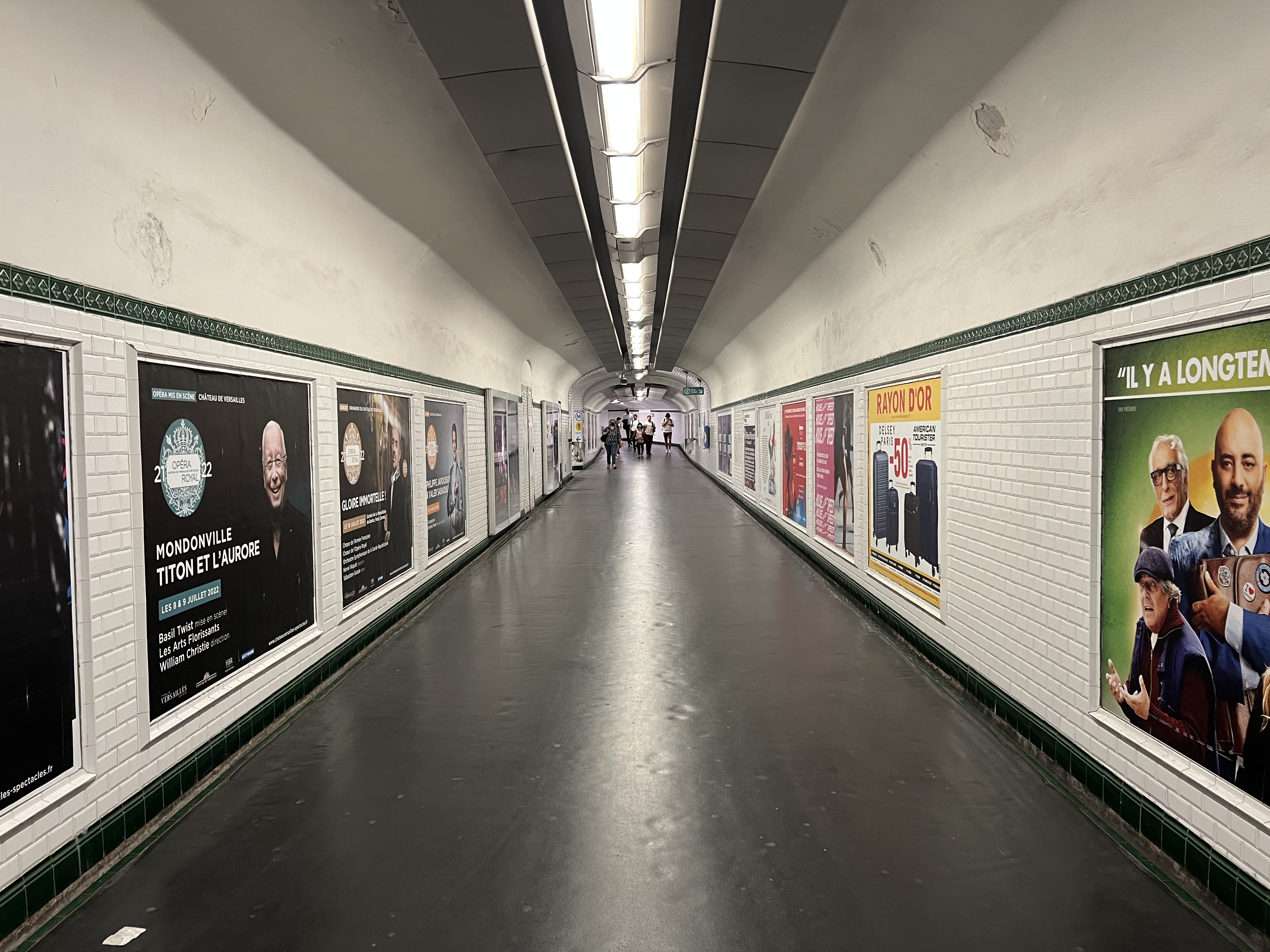
Corridors

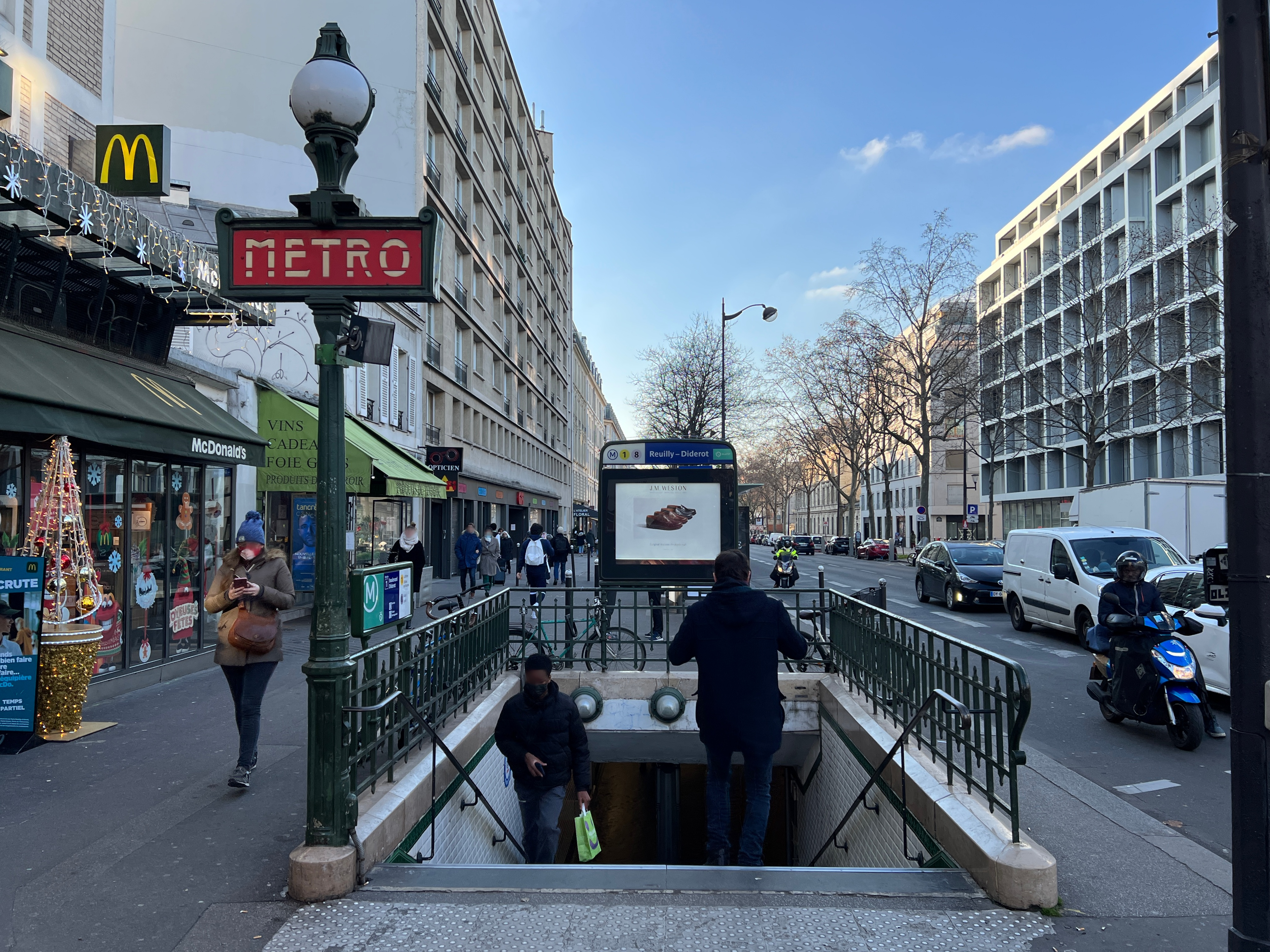
Access 1

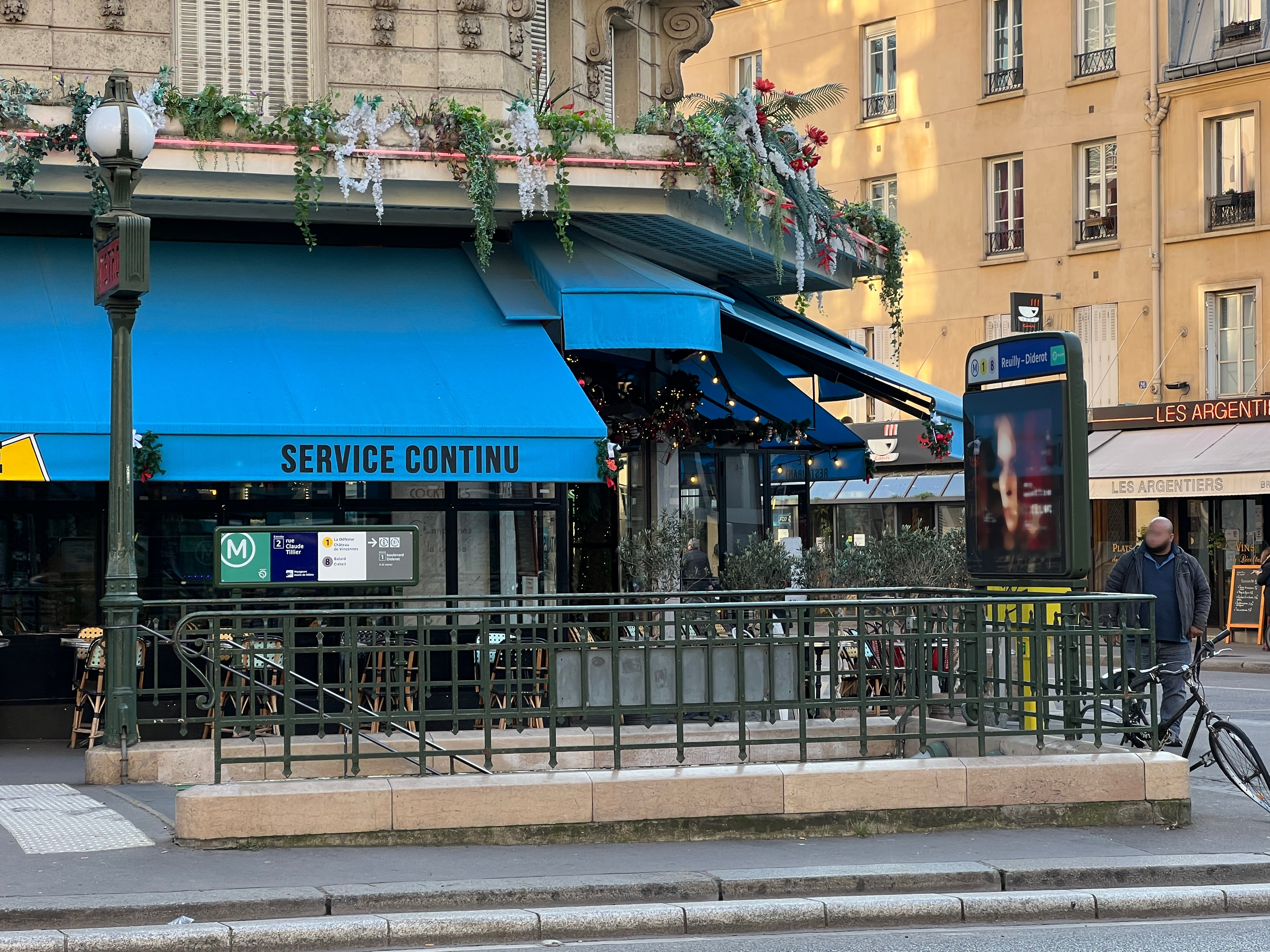
Access 2

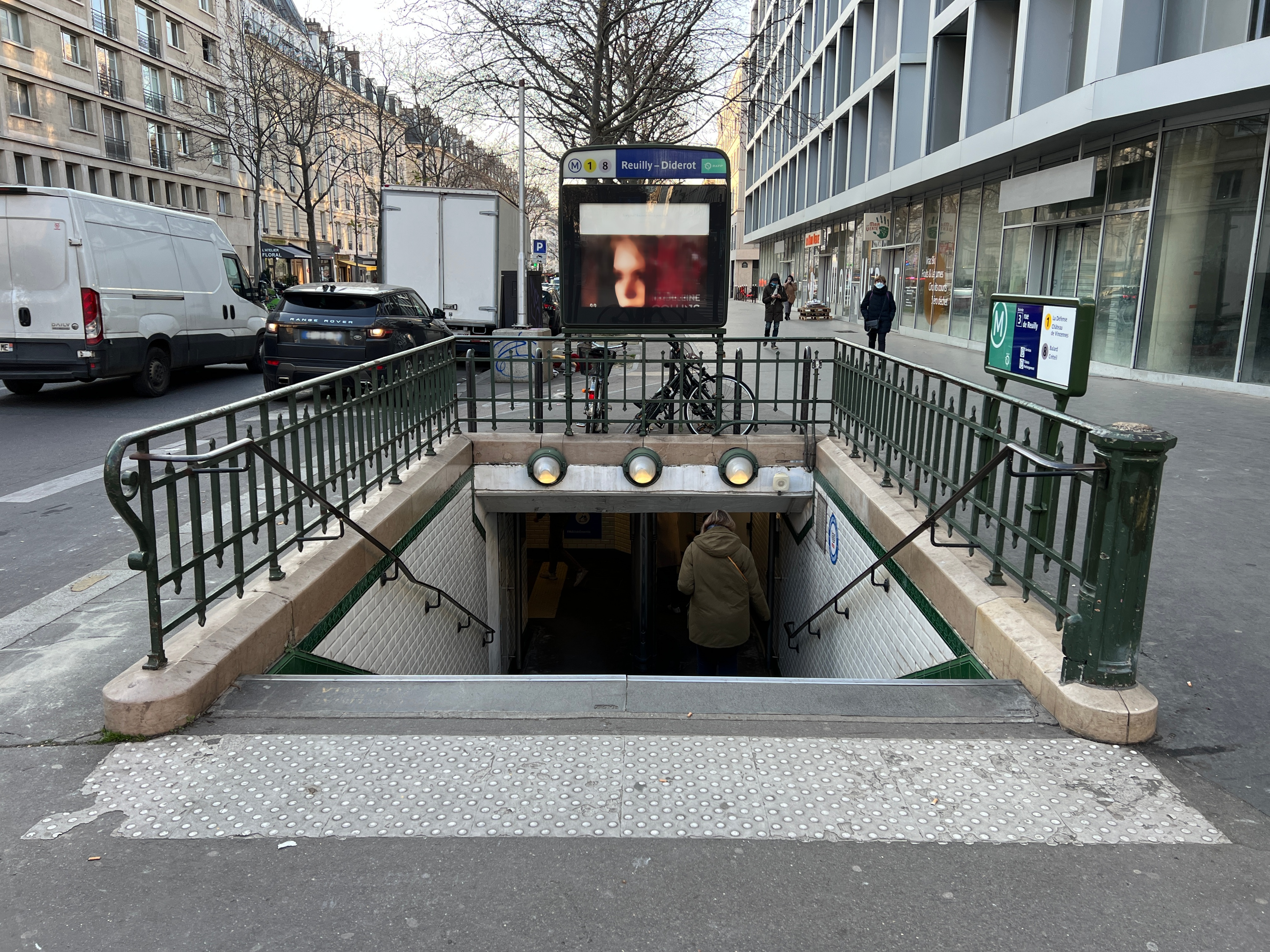
Access 3

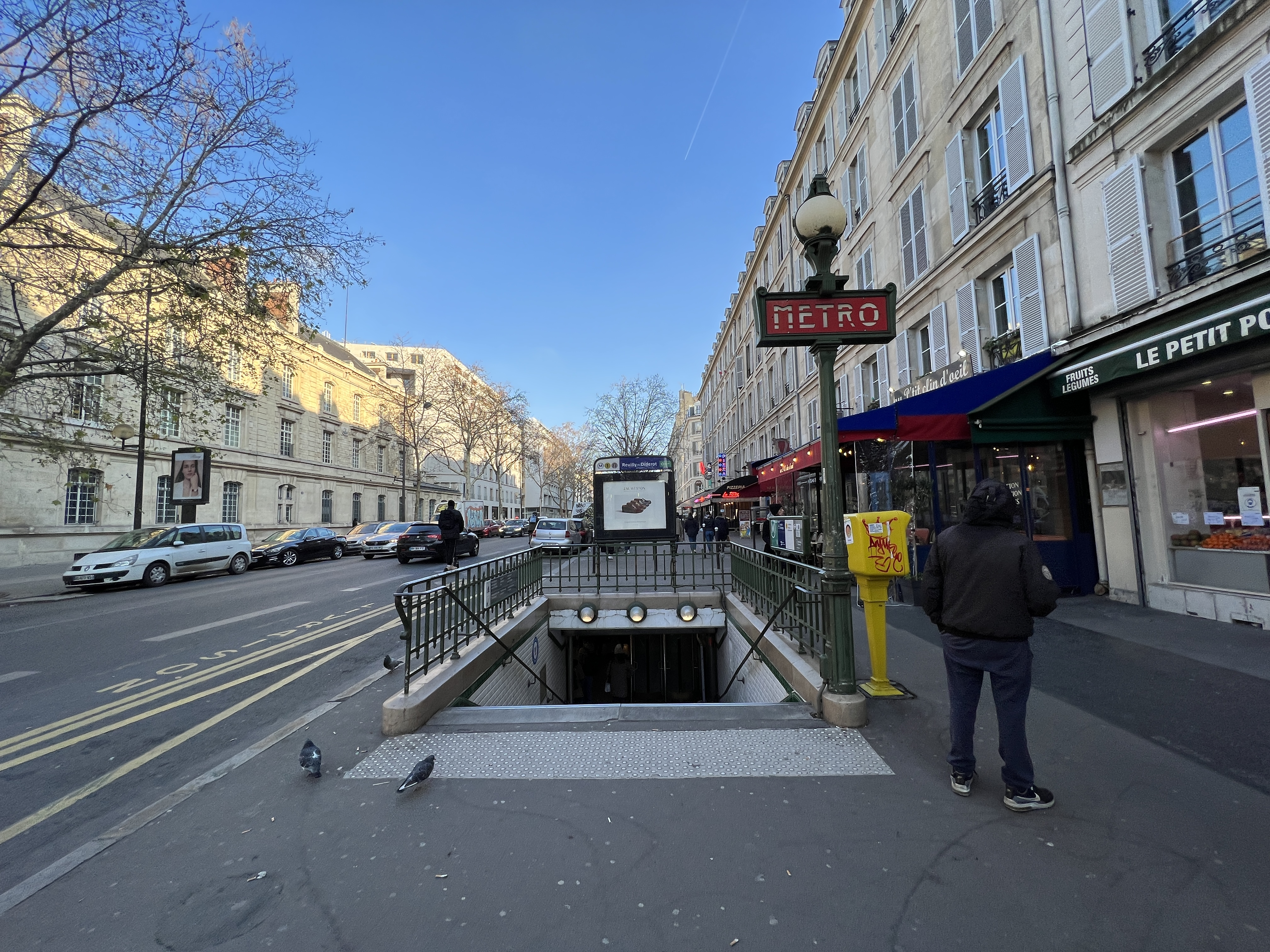
Access 4
