= Montgallet station =

Metro station in Paris, France

Montgallet
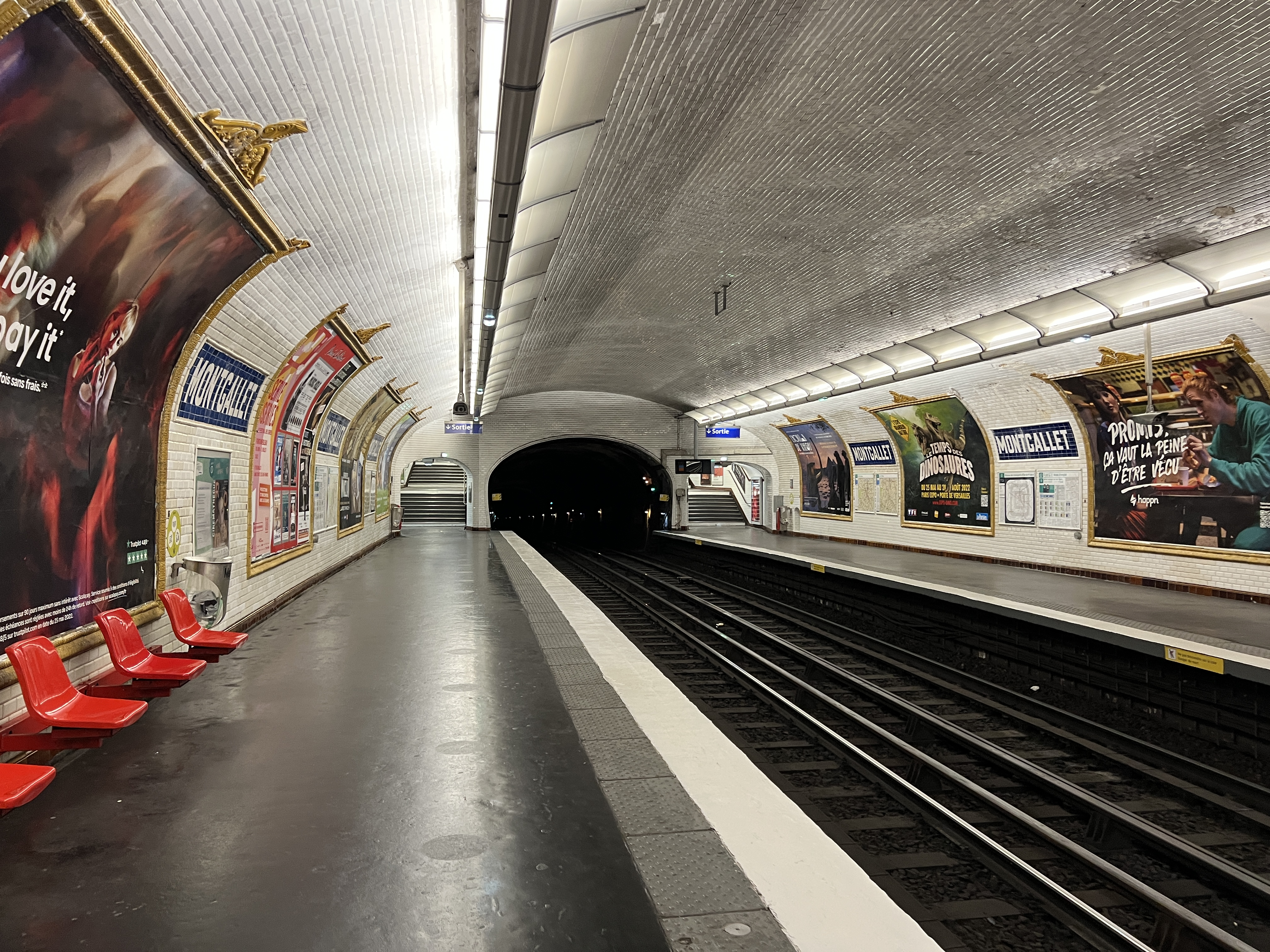
- Platforms

General information
- Location: 12th arrondissement of Paris; Île-de-France; France
- Coordinates: 48°50′39″N 2°23′24″E
- System: Paris Métro station
- Owner: RATP
- Operator: RATP
- Line: Paris Metro Paris Metro Line 8
- Platforms: 2 (side platforms)
- Tracks: 2

Construction
- Accessible: no

Other information
- Station code: 12-03
- Fare zone: 1

History
- Opened: 5 May 1931

Passengers
- 1,108,395 (2021)

Services
Preceding station	Paris Metro	Following station
Reuilly–Diderot towards Balard	Line 8	Daumesnil towards Pointe du Lac
Location
- Location within Paris

Montgallet (French pronunciation: [mɔ̃ɡalɛ]) is a station on Line 8 of the Paris Métro in the 12th arrondissement. It is named after the nearby Rue Montgallet, which is in turn named after the former owner of the land on which the road was built. Rue Montgallet is well known in Paris for its computer shops.

== History ==
The station opened on 5 May 1931 as part of the extension of Line 8 from Richelieu–Drouot to Porte de Charenton.

As part of the "Un métro + beau" programme by the RATP, the station's corridors and platform lighting were renovated and modernised on 19 November 2007.

In 2019, the station was used by 1,596,702 passengers, making it the 274th busiest of the Métro network out of 302 stations.

In 2020, the station was used by 804,190 passengers amidst the COVID-19 pandemic, making it the 266th busiest of the Métro network out of 304 stations.

In 2021, the station was used by 1,108,395 passengers, making it the 273rd busiest of the Métro network out of 304 stations.

== Passenger services ==
=== Access ===
The station has a single access at rue Montgallet.

=== Station layout ===
Street Level
B1	Mezzanine
Platform level	Side platform, doors will open on the right
Platform level	Southbound	← toward Balard (Reuilly – Diderot)
Platform level	Northbound	toward Pointe du Lac (Daumesnil) →
Platform level	Side platform, doors will open on the right

=== Platforms ===
The station has a standard configuration with 2 tracks surrounded by 2 side platforms. The increased height of its vault along with the lower portion of its side walls being vertical instead of elliptical distinguishes it from the other stations on the line.

=== Other connections ===
The station is also served by line 46 of the RATP bus network.

== Nearby ==
- Chemin de fer de Petite Ceinture (Promenade Plantée)
- Coulée verte René-Dumont
- Église Saint-Éloi de Paris
- Hôpital des Diaconesses de Reuilly
- Jardin de Reuilly - Paul Pernin
- Square Saint-Éloi

== Gallery ==
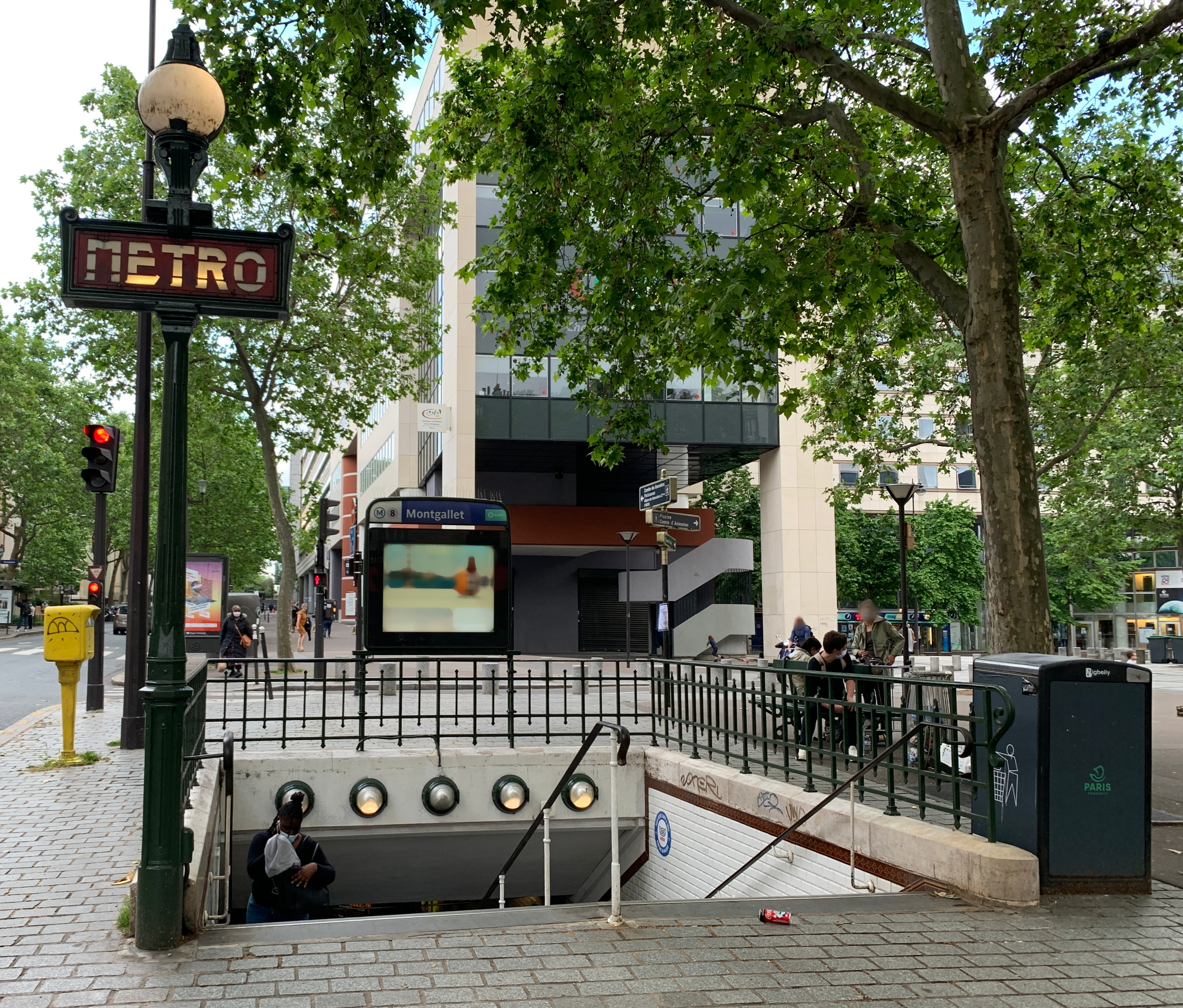
Access at rue Montgallet

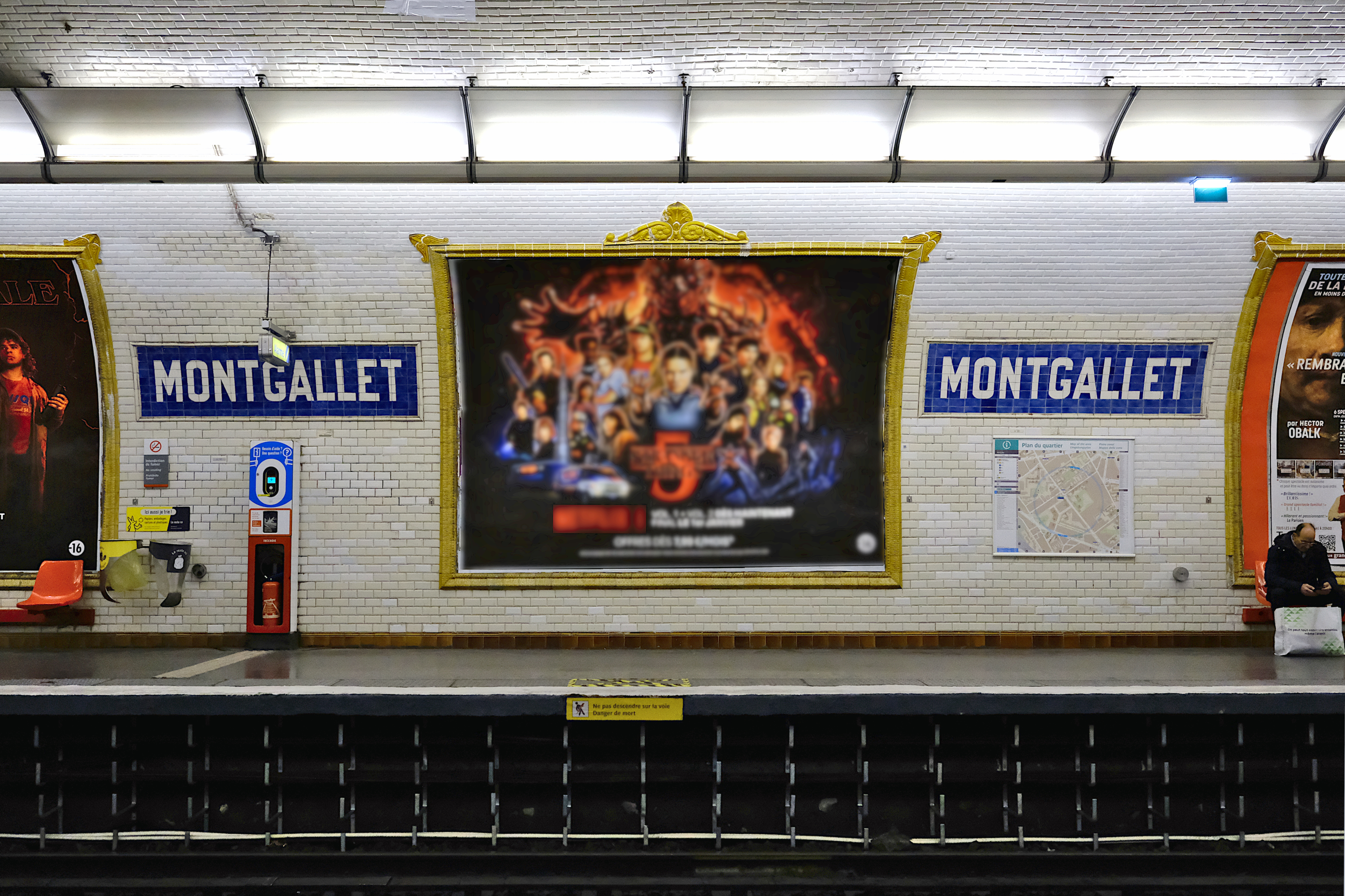
Platform.
