= Michel Bizot station =

Metro station in Paris, France

Michel Bizot
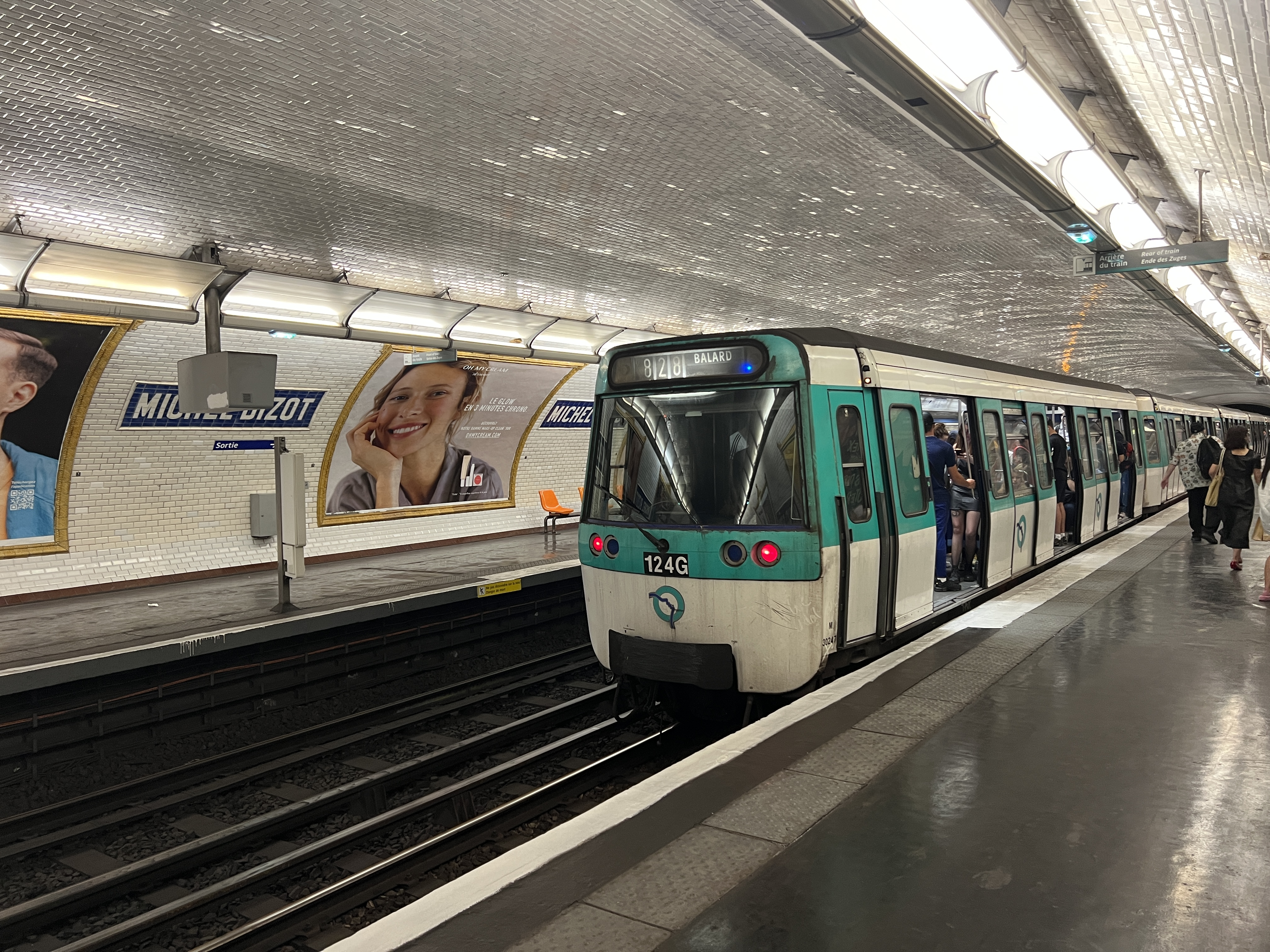
- MF 77 at Michel Bizot

General information
- Location: 12th arrondissement of Paris; Île-de-France; France
- Coordinates: 48°50′15″N 2°24′04″E
- System: Paris Métro station
- Owner: RATP
- Operator: RATP
- Line: Paris Metro Paris Metro Line 8
- Platforms: 2 (side platforms)
- Tracks: 2

Construction
- Accessible: no

Other information
- Station code: 13-10
- Fare zone: 1

History
- Opened: 5 May 1931

Passengers
- 1,403,416 (2021)

Services
Preceding station	Paris Metro	Following station
Daumesnil towards Balard	Line 8	Porte Dorée towards Pointe du Lac
Location
- Location within Paris

Michel Bizot (French pronunciation: [miʃɛl bizo]) is a station on Line 8 of the Paris Métro in the 12th arrondissement. It is named after the nearby Avenue du Général-Michel-Bizot, in turn named after the French military engineer General Michel Brice Bizot (1795–1855), fatally shot at the siege of Sevastopol during the Crimean War.

== History ==
The station opened on 5 May 1931 as part of the extension of Line 8 from Richelieu–Drouot to Porte de Charenton.

As part of the "Un métro + beau" programme by the RATP, the station's corridors and platform lighting were renovated and modernised on 6 July 2005.

In 2019, the station was used by 1,906,545 passengers, making it the 251st busiest of the Métro network out of 302 stations.

In 2020, the station was used by 910,938 passengers amidst the COVID-19 pandemic, making it the 254th busiest of the Métro network out of 304 stations.

In 2021, the station was used by 1,403,416 passengers, making it the 245th busiest of the Métro network out of 304 stations.

== Passenger services ==
=== Access ===
The station has 4 accesses:

- Access 1: rue de Toul
- Access 2: rue de Picpus
- Access 3: rue de Fécamp
- Access 4: avenue Daumesnil (an exit only escalator from the northbound platform)

=== Station layout ===
Street Level
B1	Mezzanine
Platform level	Side platform, doors will open on the right
Platform level	Southbound	← toward Balard (Daumesnil)
Platform level	Northbound	toward Pointe du Lac (Porte Dorée) →
Platform level	Side platform, doors will open on the right

=== Platforms ===
The station has a standard configuration with two tracks surrounded by two side platforms. The vault is elliptical. The decoration is of the style used for the majority of metro stations. The lighting canopies are white and rounded in the Gaudin style of the Renouveau du Métro des Années 2000, and the beveled white ceramic tiles cover the straight walls, the vault, the tunnel exits and the outlets of the corridors. The advertising frames are made of honey-colored earthenware and the name of the station is also made of earthenware in the style of the original CMP . The seats are Motte style and orange in color. This decoration is completely identical to that of the neighboring station, Porte Dorée.

=== Other connections ===
The station is also served by line 46 of the RATP bus network, and at night, by line N33 of the Noctilien bus network.

== Nearby ==
- Chemin de fer de Petite Ceinture (Promenade Plantée)
- Coulée verte René-Dumont
- Jardin Ilan-Halimi
- Square Charles-Péguy

== Gallery ==
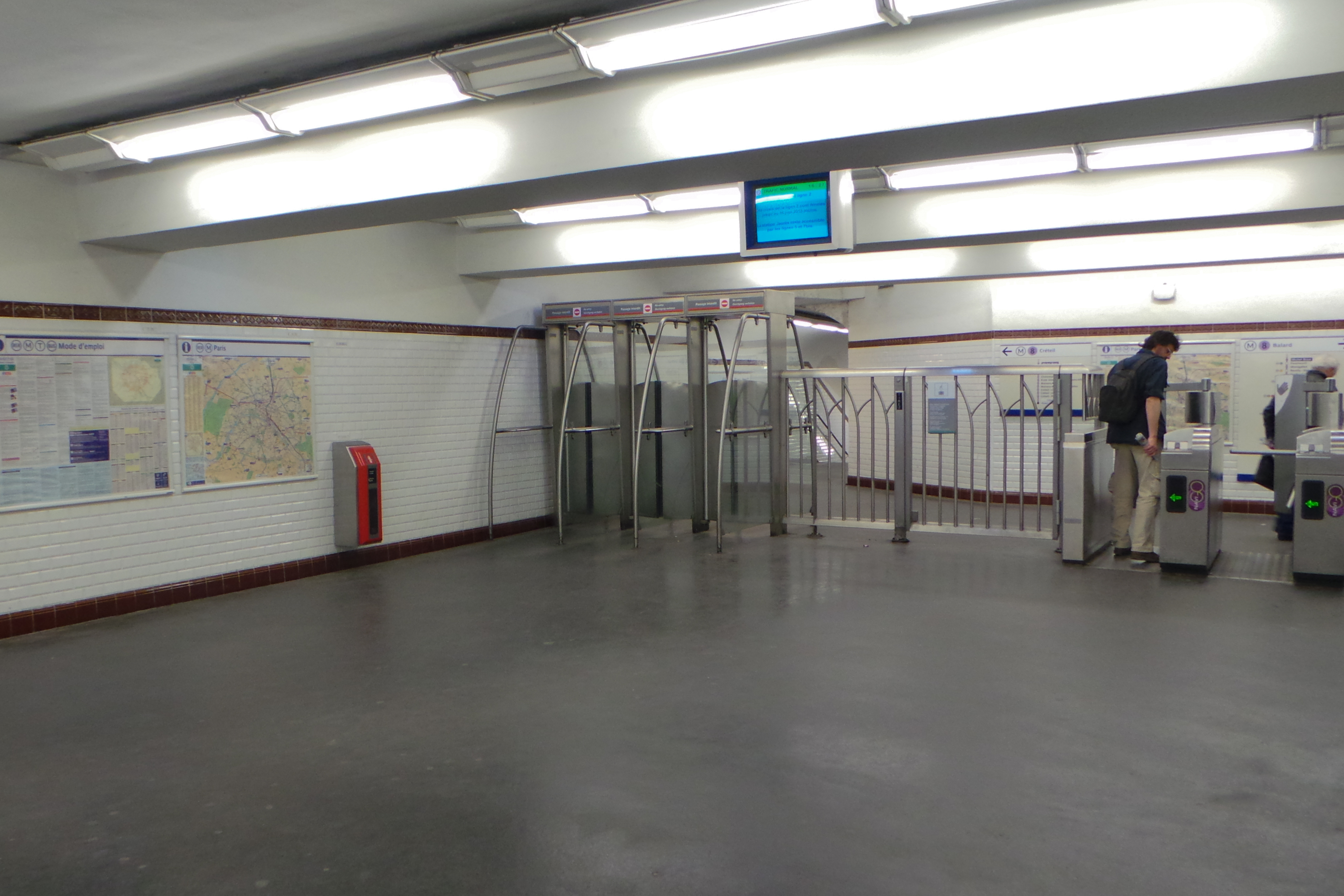
Ticket barriers at the mezzanine

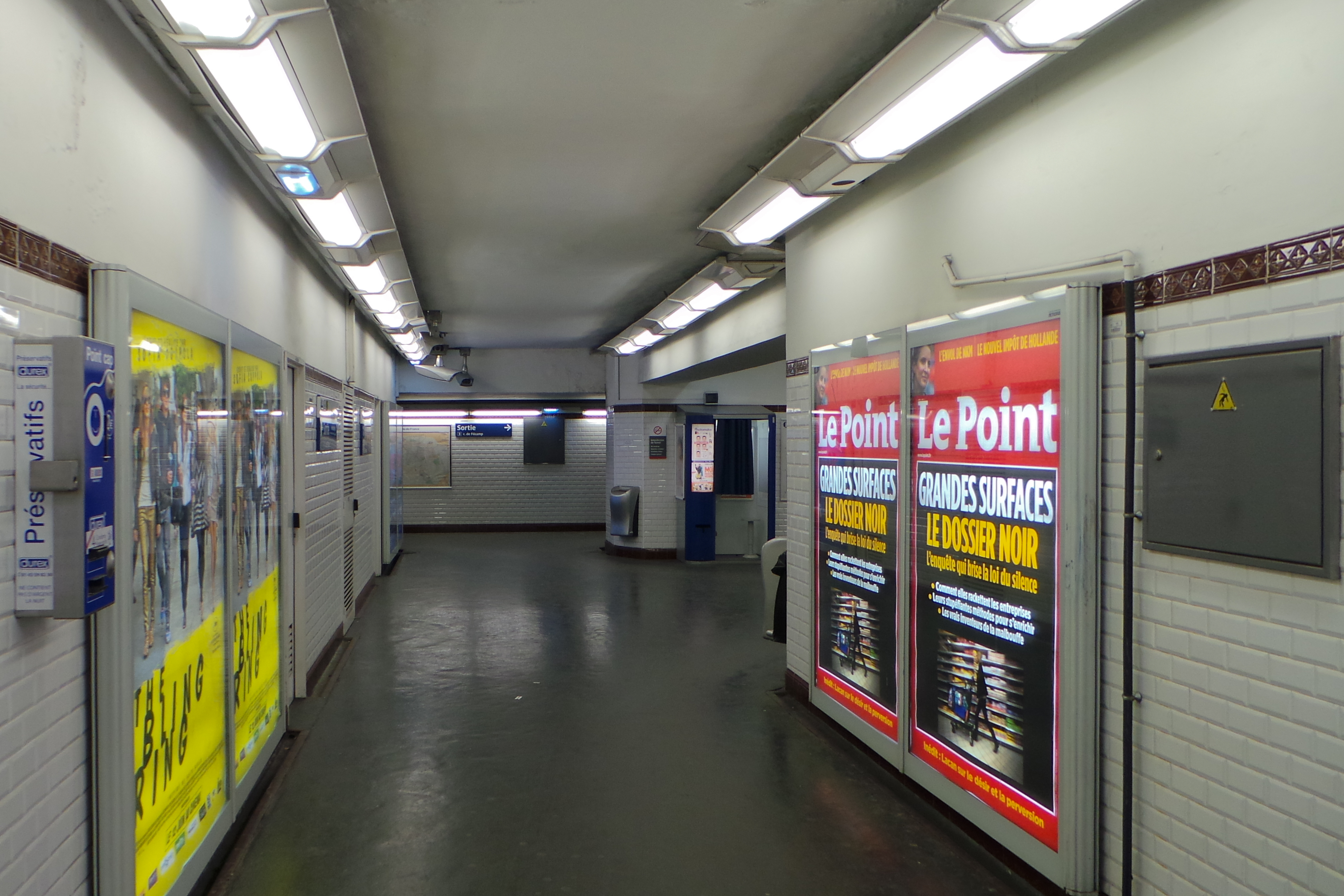
Station corridors

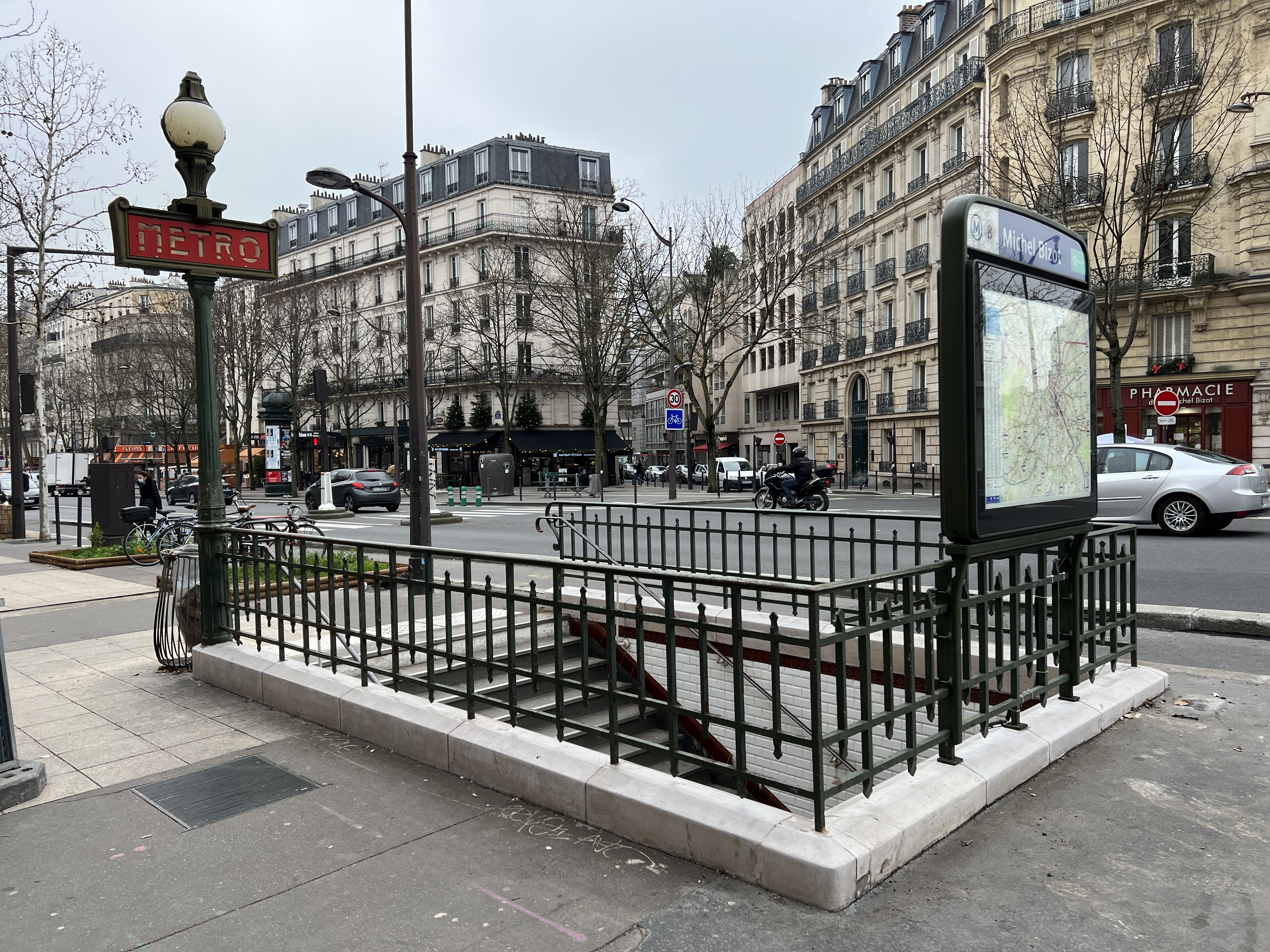
Access 1

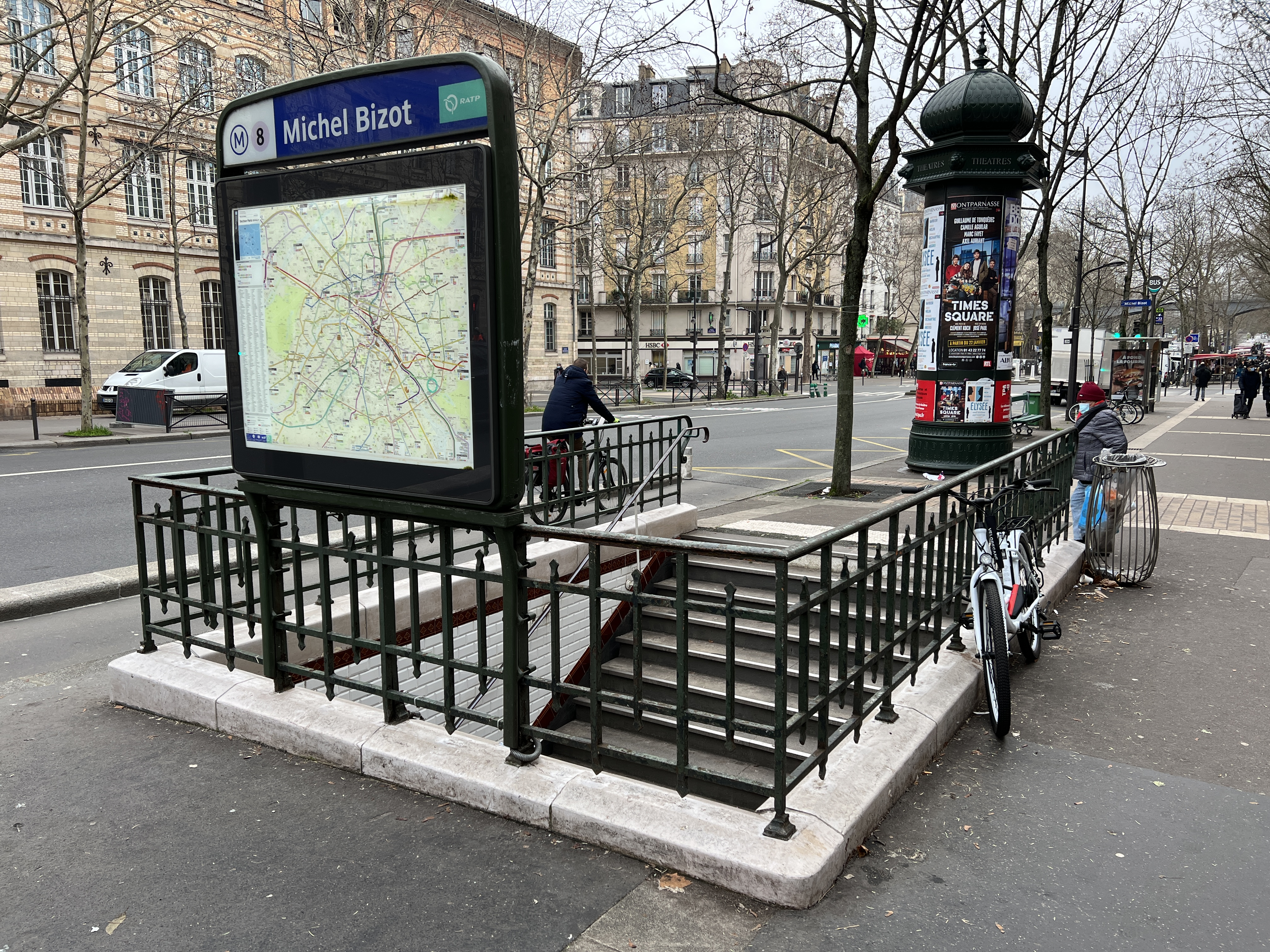
Access 2

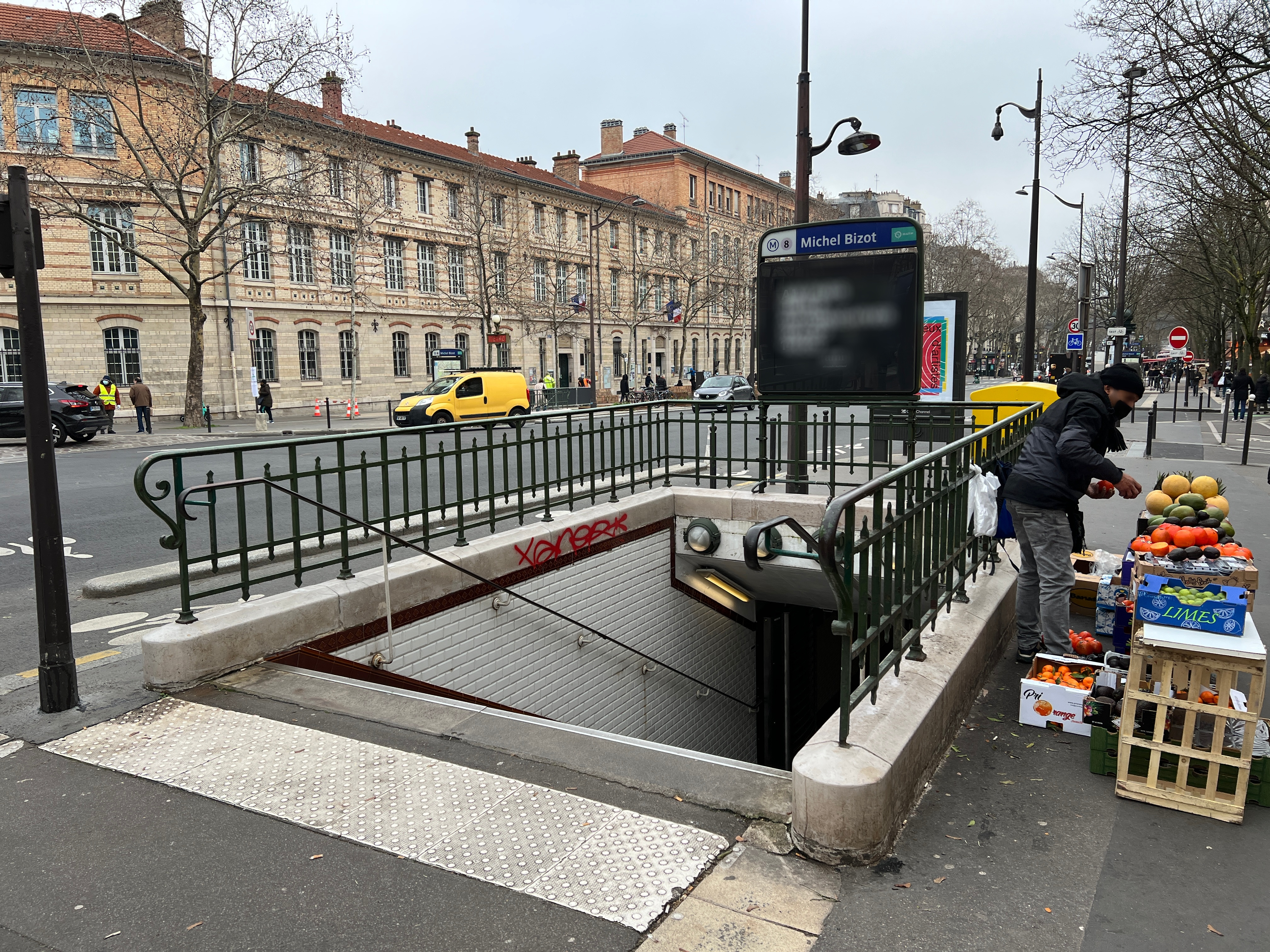
Access 3

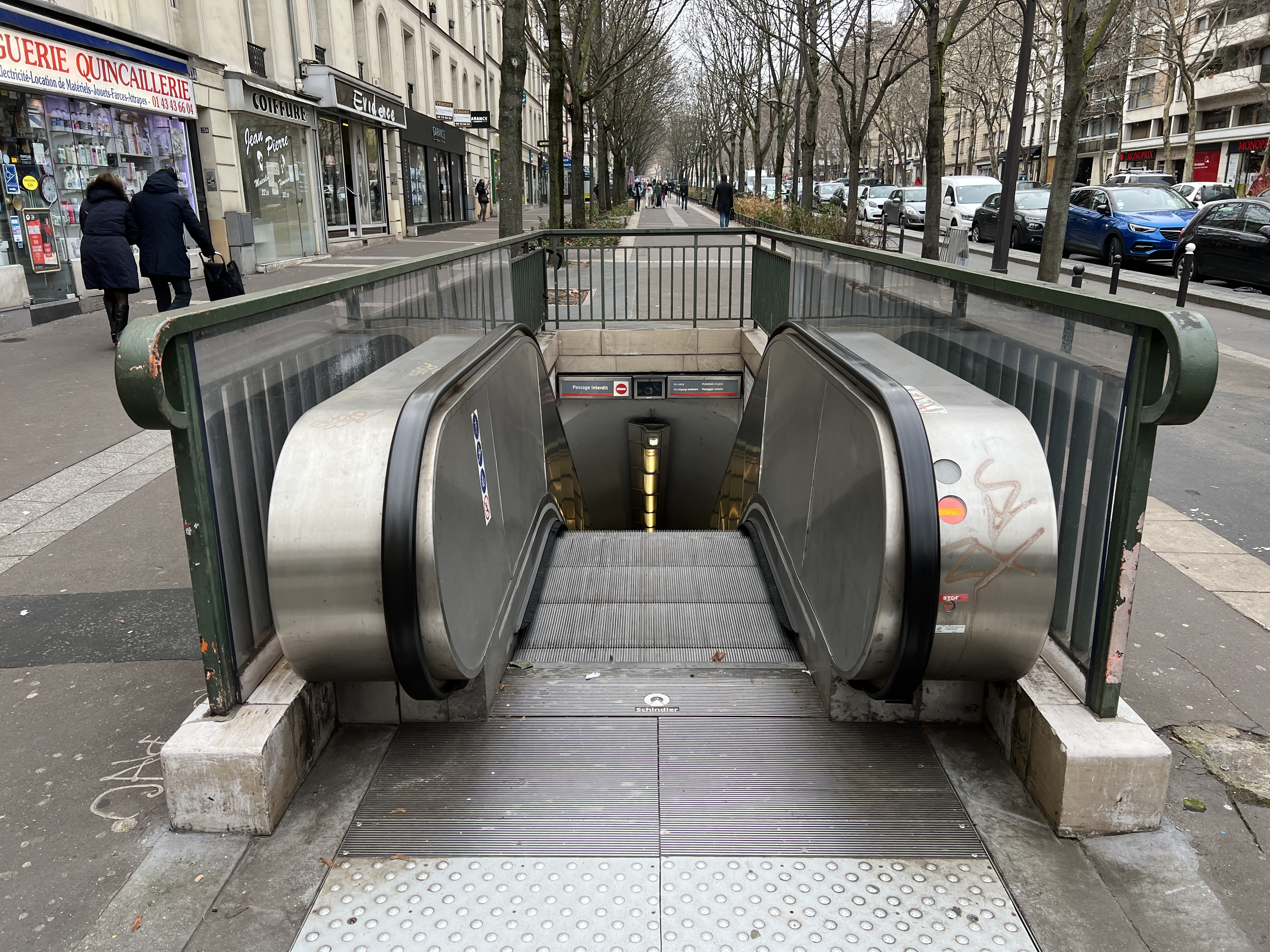
Access 4
