= Daumesnil station =

Metro station in Paris, France

Daumesnil
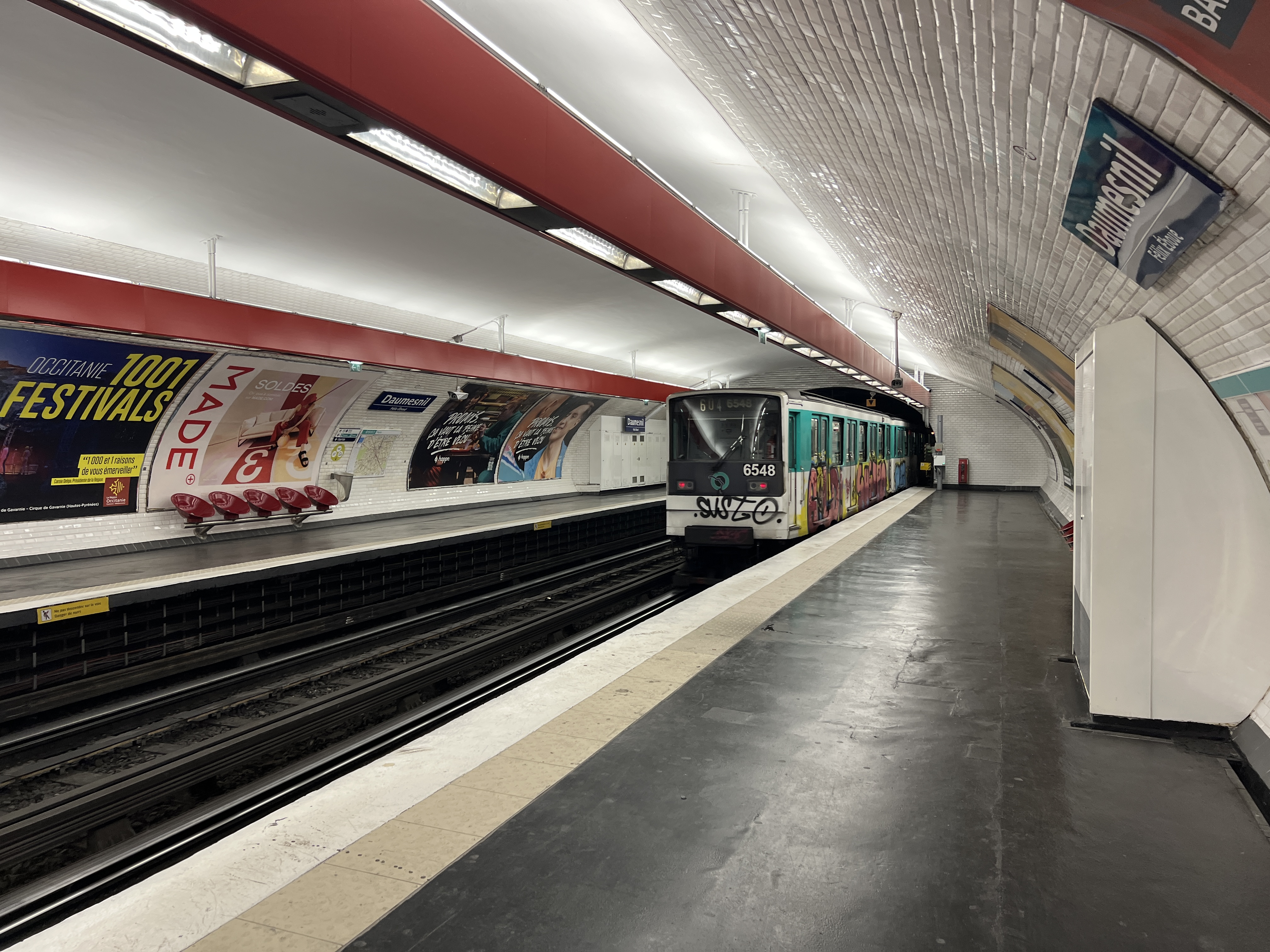
- Line 6 platforms at Daumesnil

General information
- Location: 12th arrondissement of Paris; Île-de-France; France
- Coordinates: 48°50′23″N 2°23′45″E
- System: Paris Métro station
- Owner: RATP
- Operator: RATP
- Line: Paris Metro Paris Metro Line 6 Paris Metro Line 8
- Platforms: 4 (side platforms)
- Tracks: 4

Construction
- Accessible: No

Other information
- Fare zone: 1

History
- Opened: 1 March 1909 (Line 6); 5 May 1931 (Line 8)

Services
Preceding station	Paris Metro	Following station
Dugommier towards Charles de Gaulle–Étoile	Line 6	Bel-Air towards Nation
Montgallet towards Balard	Line 8	Michel Bizot towards Pointe du Lac
Location
- Location within Paris

Daumesnil (French pronunciation: [domenil]) is a station on Lines 6 and 8 of the Paris Métro in the 12th arrondissement.

== History ==
The station opened on 1 March 1909 with the opening of the original section of Line 6 from Place d'Italie to Nation. The Line 8 platforms opened on 5 May 1931 with the extension of the line from Richelieu–Drouot to Porte de Charenton.

The station was named after Place Daumesnil above the station, and Avenue Daumesnil which passes through it. In 1946, the square was renamed Place Félix-Éboué, which was then added to the station name.

Pierre Daumesnil (1776–1832) was a soldier in the French Revolutionary and Napoleonic Wars who rose from the ranks to become a brigadier general. He lost a leg at the Battle of Wagram and, while in command of the Château de Vincennes in 1814, defiantly announced that he would surrender it to the Allies only when he got his leg back. Félix Éboué (1884–1944) was a colonial official who, as Governor of Chad, accepted De Gaulle's authority in August 1940 and soon brought the rest of French Equatorial Africa, providing the Free French movement a territorial base.

The square was the location of the Barrière de Reuilly, a gate in the Wall of the Ferme générale. Built in 1784–88, the Wall enforced collection of municipal import taxes, and was demolished in the 1860s.

Nearby is the Coulée verte René-Dumont, also known as the Promenade Plantée—a 4.5 km long elevated garden along the abandoned railway which led to the former Gare de la Bastille railway station.

Like a third of the stations on the network between 1974 and 1984, the platforms of both lines were modernized in the Andreu-Motte style, in this case red on Line 6 and blue for Line 8, with the retention of the original bevelled white tiles in both cases.

As part of the RATP Un metro + beau programme, the corridors of the station were renovated in turn and opened on 29 June 2014.

According to RATP estimates, the station saw 4,954,004 passengers enter in 2019, which places it in 86th position among metro stations for its attendance. In 2020, with the Covid-19 crisis, its annual traffic fell to 2,723,508 passengers, which ranked it 63rd.

In January 2021, the characteristic Motte masonry benches were removed from the platforms of Line 6, as well as the seats they had been surmounted until then, replaced by Akiko models of the same shade.

The station's traffic gradually recovered in 2021 with 3,634,023 entrants recorded, relegating it to the 70th position of the stations of the network for its attendance that year.

== Passenger services ==
=== Access ===
The station has four entrances:

- Access 1 - Place Félix-Éboué, consisting of a fixed staircase lined with an escalator going up, decorated with a candelabra and a Dervaux-type balustrade, leading to the south of this square to the right of No. 6;
- Access 2 - Rue Claude-Decaen, consisting of a fixed staircase also decorated with a mast and a Dervaux surround, located south-east of the square facing no. 100 Rue Claude-Decaen;
- Access 3 - Avenue Daumesnil, consisting of a fixed staircase lined with an escalator going up, decorated with a Guimard entrance classified as a historic monument (decree of 12 February 2016) and a Dervaux totem, located at the corner formed by Boulevard de Reuilly and Avenue Daumesnil opposite no. 199 of the latter;
- Access 4 - Rue de Reuilly, consisting of a fixed staircase with a Dervaux balustrade, leading to the right of no. 118 of this street.

=== Station layout ===
Street Level

B1	Mezzanine for platform connection

Line 6 platform level	Side platform, doors will open on the right
Line 6 platform level	toward Charles de Gaulle – Étoile	← toward Charles de Gaulle–Étoile (Dugommier)
Line 6 platform level	toward Nation	toward Nation (Bel-Air) →
Line 6 platform level	Side platform, doors will open on the right

Line 8 platform level	Side platform, doors will open on the right
Line 8 platform level	toward Balard	← toward Balard (Montgallet)
Line 8 platform level	toward Pointe du Lac	toward Pointe du Lac (Michel Bizot) →
Line 8 platform level	Side platform, doors will open on the right

== Platforms ==
The platforms of the two lines are of standard configuration. Two per stopping point, they are separated by the metro tracks located in the centre and the vault is elliptical.

They are furnished in the Andreu-Motte style in both cases. Those of line 6 have two red illuminated canopies, benches, and corridor outlets in flat tiles of the same shade and burgundy Akiko seats (flat red tile benches surmounted by red Motte seats), while those of line 8 have the same components in blue as well as blue Motte seats, flat coloured tiles covering the tunnel exits. This decoration is married with the bevelled white tiles for both lines. On the one hand, it is applied to the wall and tunnel exits on line 6, the vault being coated and painted white, while it covers the walls and the vault on line 8. In addition, the name of the station, inscribed on enamelled plaques, is in Parisine font for line 6 and in capital letters for line 8. The advertising frames are respectively metallic and honey-coloured ceramic with plant motifs in the interwar style of the original CMP.

=== Bus services ===
The station is served by lines 29, 46, 64 and 71 of the RATP bus network.

== Gallery ==
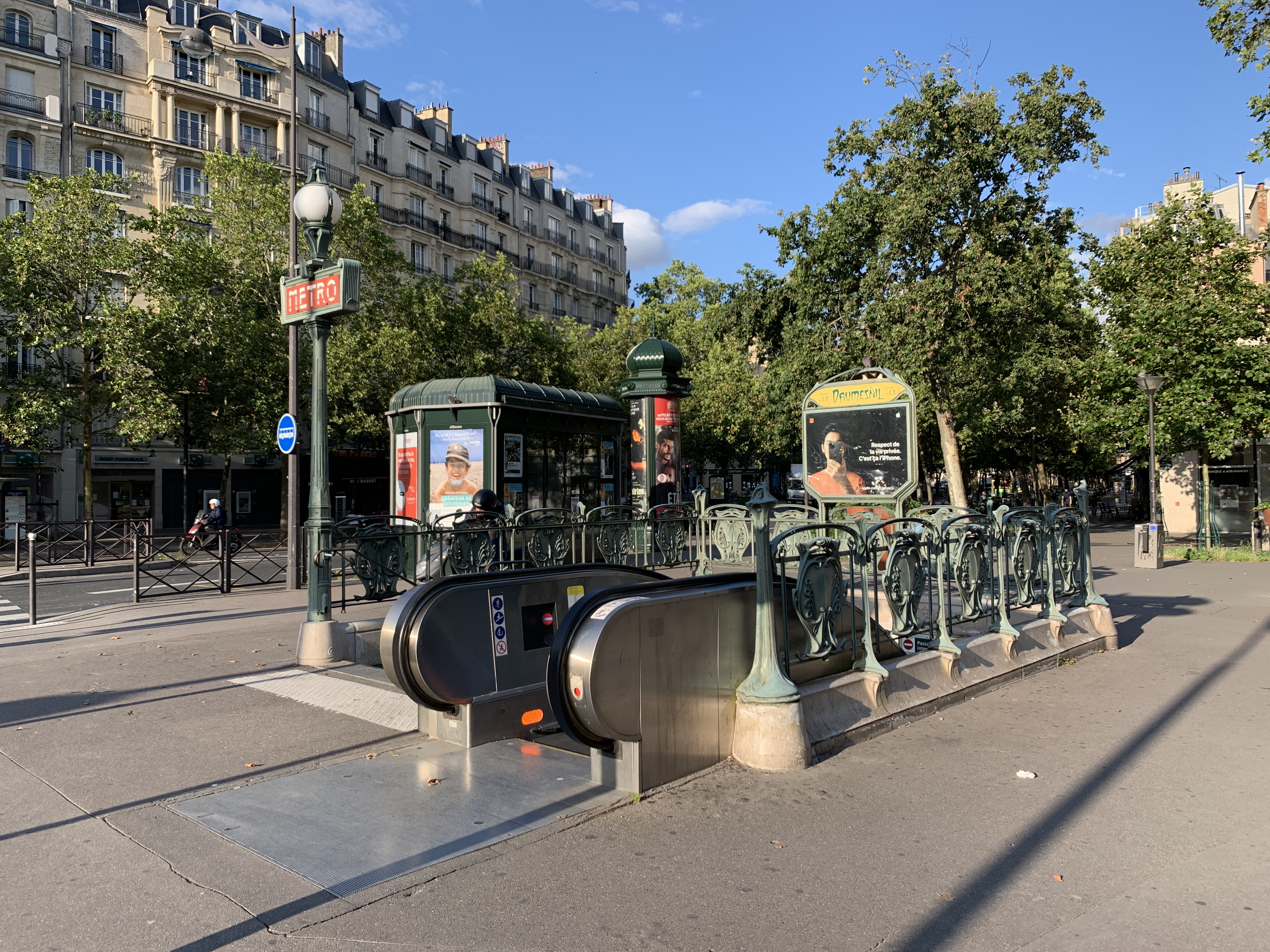
Station entrance

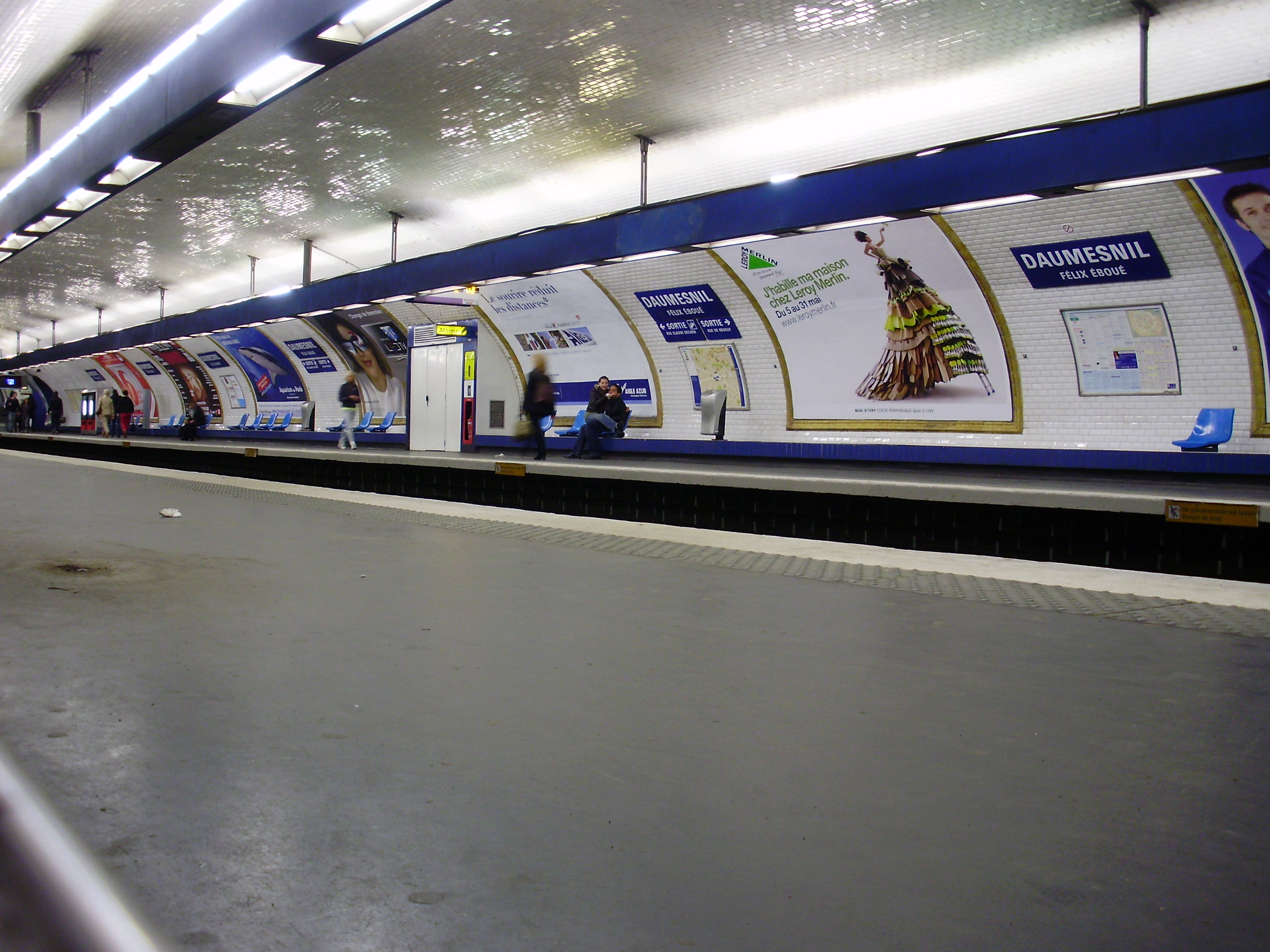
Line 8 platforms at Daumesnil
