= Porte Dorée station =

Metro station in Paris, France

Porte Dorée
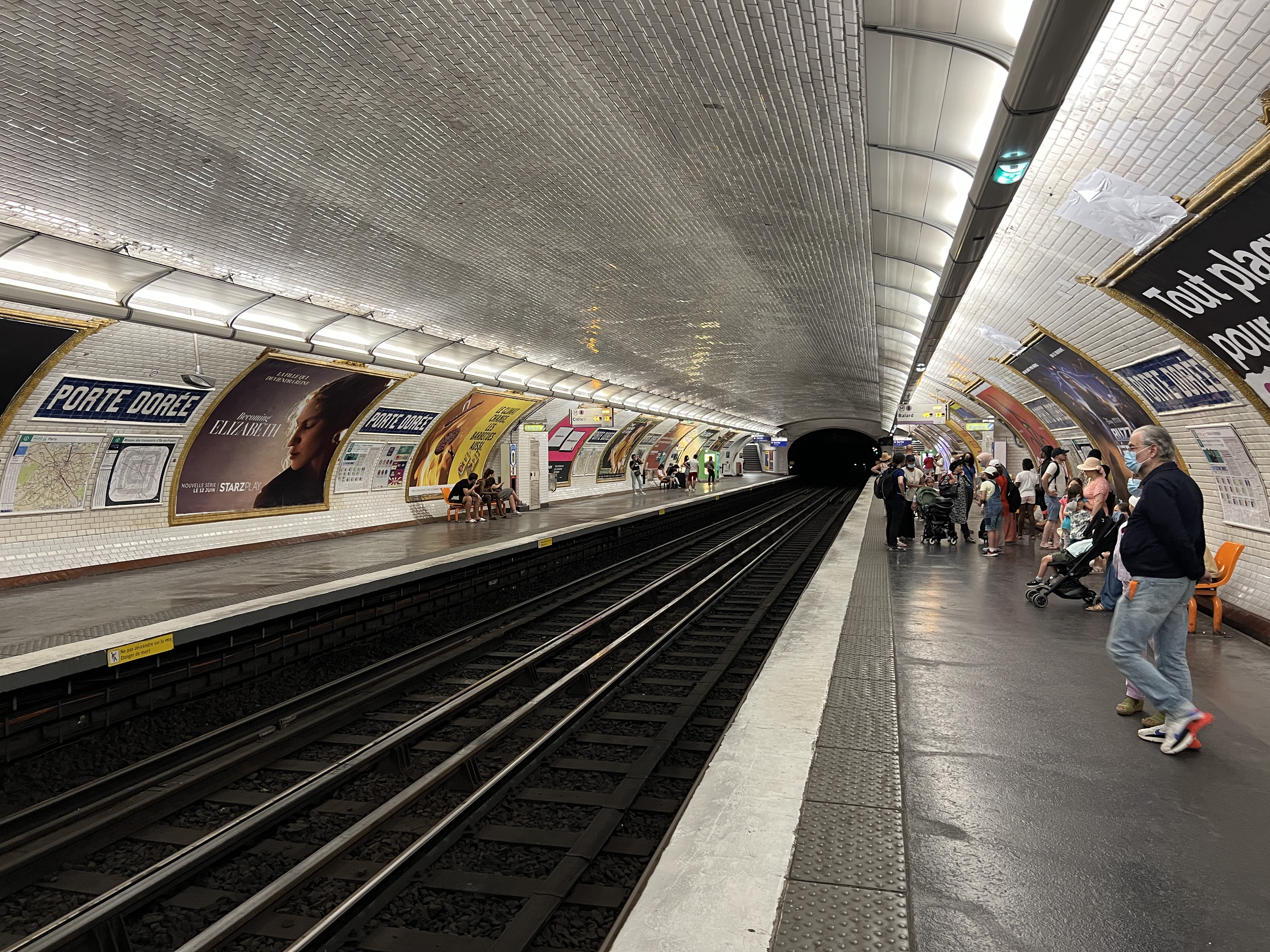
- Platforms

General information
- Location: 12th arrondissement of Paris; Île-de-France; France
- Coordinates: 48°50′08″N 2°24′22″E
- System: Paris Métro station
- Owner: RATP
- Operator: RATP
- Line: Paris Metro Paris Metro Line 8
- Platforms: 2 (side platforms)
- Tracks: 2
- Connections: Tramways in Île-de-France Île-de-France tramway Line 3a

Construction
- Accessible: no

Other information
- Station code: 1301
- Fare zone: 1

History
- Opened: 5 May 1931

Passengers
- 2021: 1,918,182

Services
Preceding station	Paris Metro	Following station
Michel Bizot towards Balard	Line 8	Porte de Charenton towards Pointe du Lac
Preceding station	Tram	Following station
Porte de Charenton towards Pont du Garigliano	T3a	Montempoivre towards Porte de Vincennes
Location
- Location within Paris

Porte Dorée (French pronunciation: [pɔʁt dɔʁe]; lit. 'Golden Gate') is a station on Line 8 of the Paris Métro in the 12th arrondissement.

The station opened on 5 May 1931 with the extension of the line from Richelieu–Drouot to Porte de Charenton. It is named after the Porte Dorée, one of the former city gates of Paris.

Along with Porte de Bagnolet on Line 3, Porte de Pantin on Line 5, and Porte d'Italie on Line 7, it is one of the four stations on the network built at the former gates of Paris without having originally served as a terminus.

== History ==
The station opened on 5 May 1931 as part of the extension of Line 8 from Richelieu–Drouot to Porte de Charenton for the Paris Colonial Exposition held in the nearby Bois de Vincennes in 1931.

On the evening of 16 May 1937, Lætitia Toureaux was found stabbed in the first class car where she was alone, the first murder on the Métro. Despite many investigations over the years, the identity of the culprit remains unknown till today. This story inspired Pierre Siniac's (1928–2002) novel Le Crime du dernier métro published in 2001 as well as one of the legends of the Le Manoir de Paris, a walk-through haunted house in the 10th arrondissement.

As part of the "Un métro + beau" programme by the RATP, the station's corridors and platform lighting were renovated and modernised on 2 December 2008.

In 2019, the station was used by 2,763,236 passengers, making it the 191st busiest of the Métro network out of 302 stations.

In 2020, the station was used by 1,428,784 passengers amidst the COVID-19 pandemic, making it the 182nd busiest of the Métro network out of 304 stations.

In 2021, the station was used by 1,918,182 passengers, making it the 186th busiest of the Métro network out of 304 stations.

== Passenger services ==
=== Access ===
The station has 6 accesses:

- Access 1: Place Édouard Renard Palais de la Porte Dorée (with an ascending escalator)
- Access 2: Avenue Daumesnil
- Access 3: Boulevard Poniatowski
- Access 4: Rue Ernest Lacoste
- Access 5: Rue de Picpus
- Access 6: Rue Joseph Chailley

=== Station layout ===
Street Level
B1	Mezzanine
Platform level	Side platform, doors will open on the right
Platform level	Southbound	← toward Balard (Michel Bizot)
Platform level	Northbound	toward Pointe du Lac (Porte de Charenton) →
Platform level	Side platform, doors will open on the right

=== Platforms ===
The station has a standard configuration with two tracks surrounded by two side platforms. The vault is elliptical. The decoration is of the style used for the majority of metro stations. The lighting canopies are white and rounded in the Gaudin style of the Renouveau du Métro des Années 2000 revival, and the beveled white ceramic tiles cover the straight walls, the vault and the tunnel exits. The advertising frames are made of honey-coloured earthenware and the name of the station is also made of earthenware. The seats are Motte style, orange in colour.

=== Other connections ===
==== Tramway ====
The station has been served by tramway Line T3a since 15 December 2012 as part of its extension from Porte d'Ivry to Porte de Vincennes.

==== Bus ====
The station is also served by lines 46 and 201 of the RATP bus network, and at night, by line N33 of the Noctilien bus network.

== Nearby ==
- Bois de Vincennes (where the Pelouse de Reuilly, the location of the Foire du Trône fun fair in April and May, is located)
- Foire du Trône
- Palais de la Porte Dorée (an exhibition hall built for the Paris Colonial Exposition)
  - Aquarium du palais de la Porte-Dorée
  - Cité nationale de l'histoire de l'immigration (a museum of immigration history)
- Paris Zoological Park
- Porte Dorée

== Gallery ==
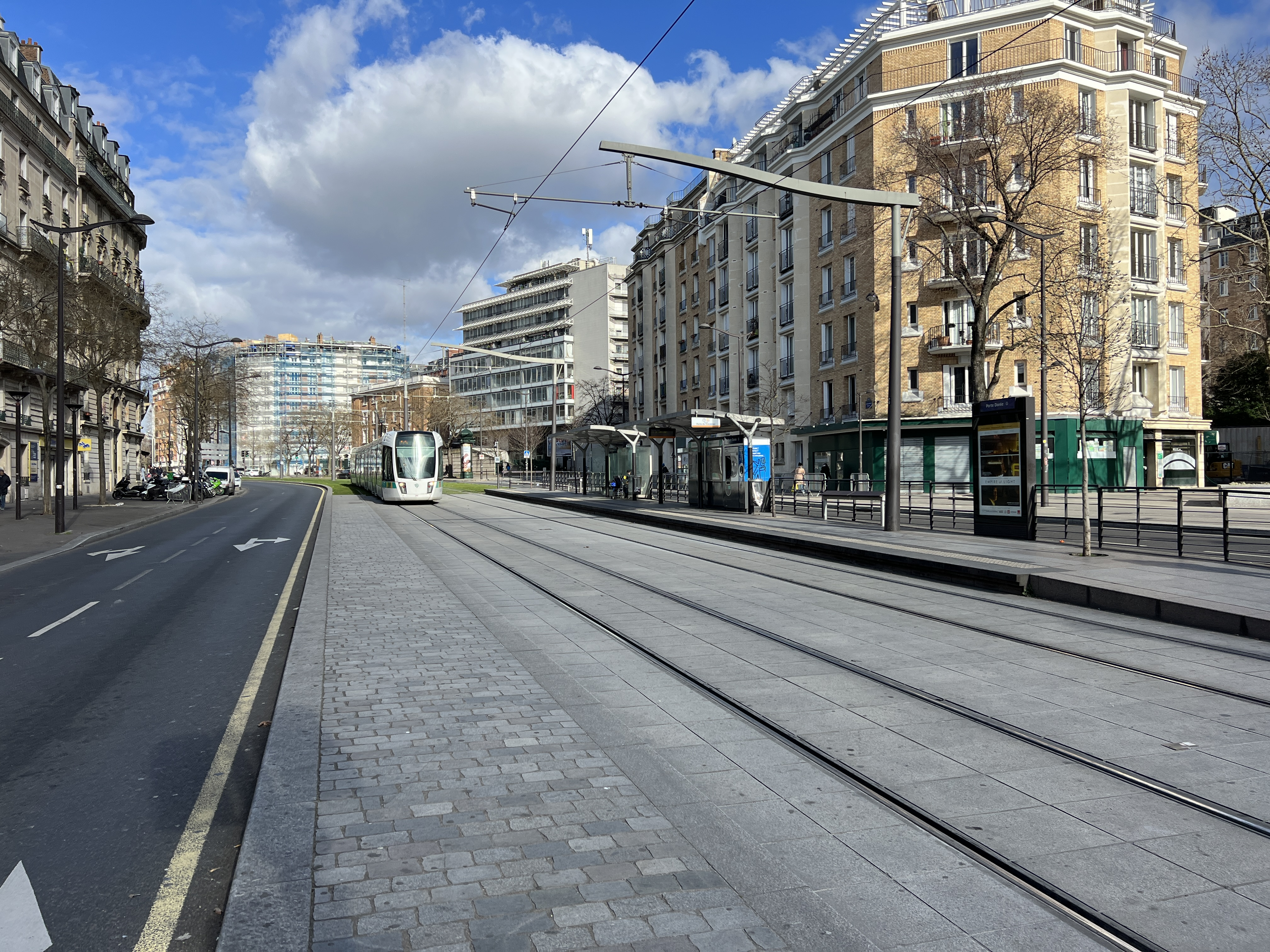
T3a at Porte Dorée

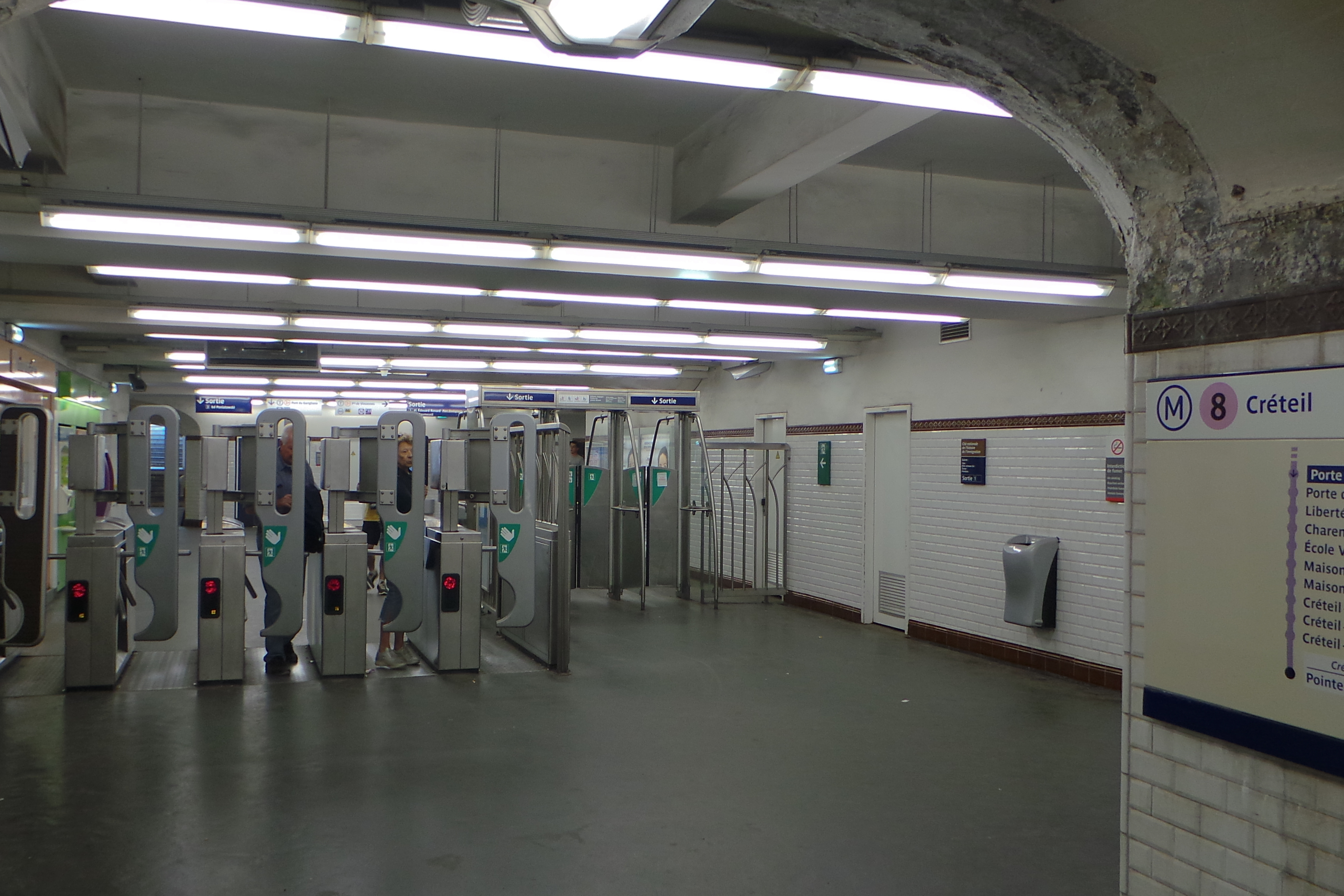
Ticket barriers

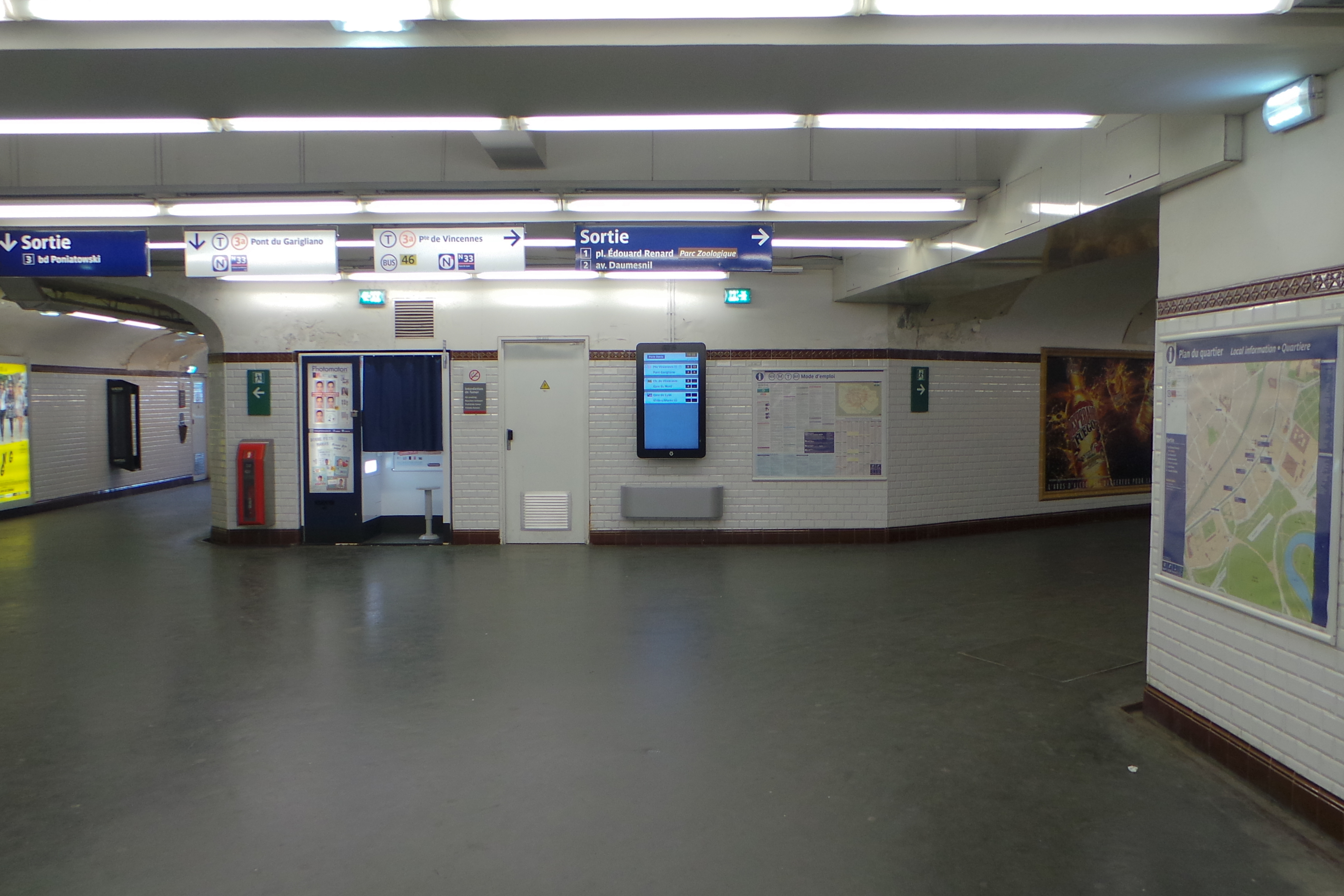
Mezzanine

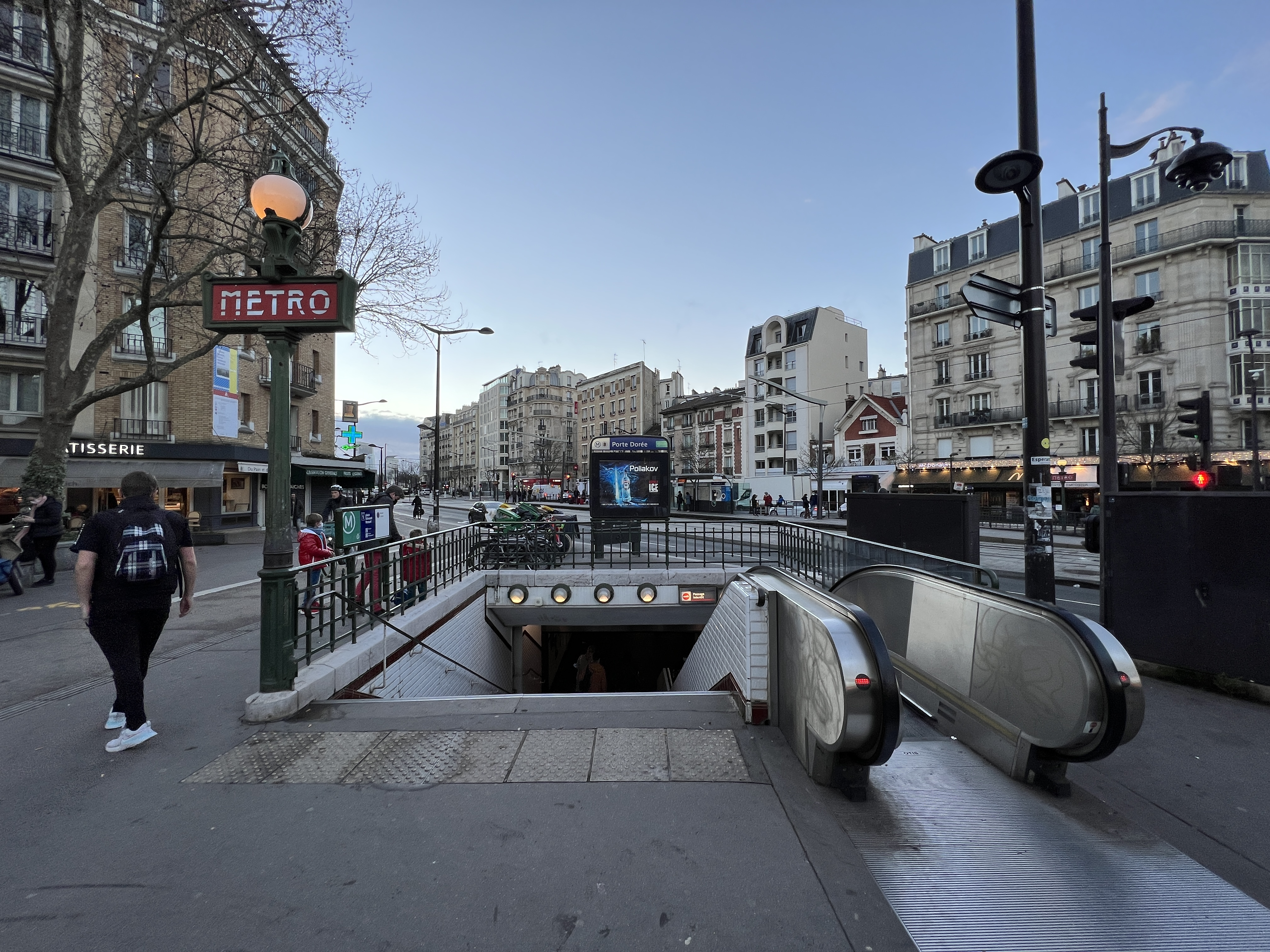
Access 1

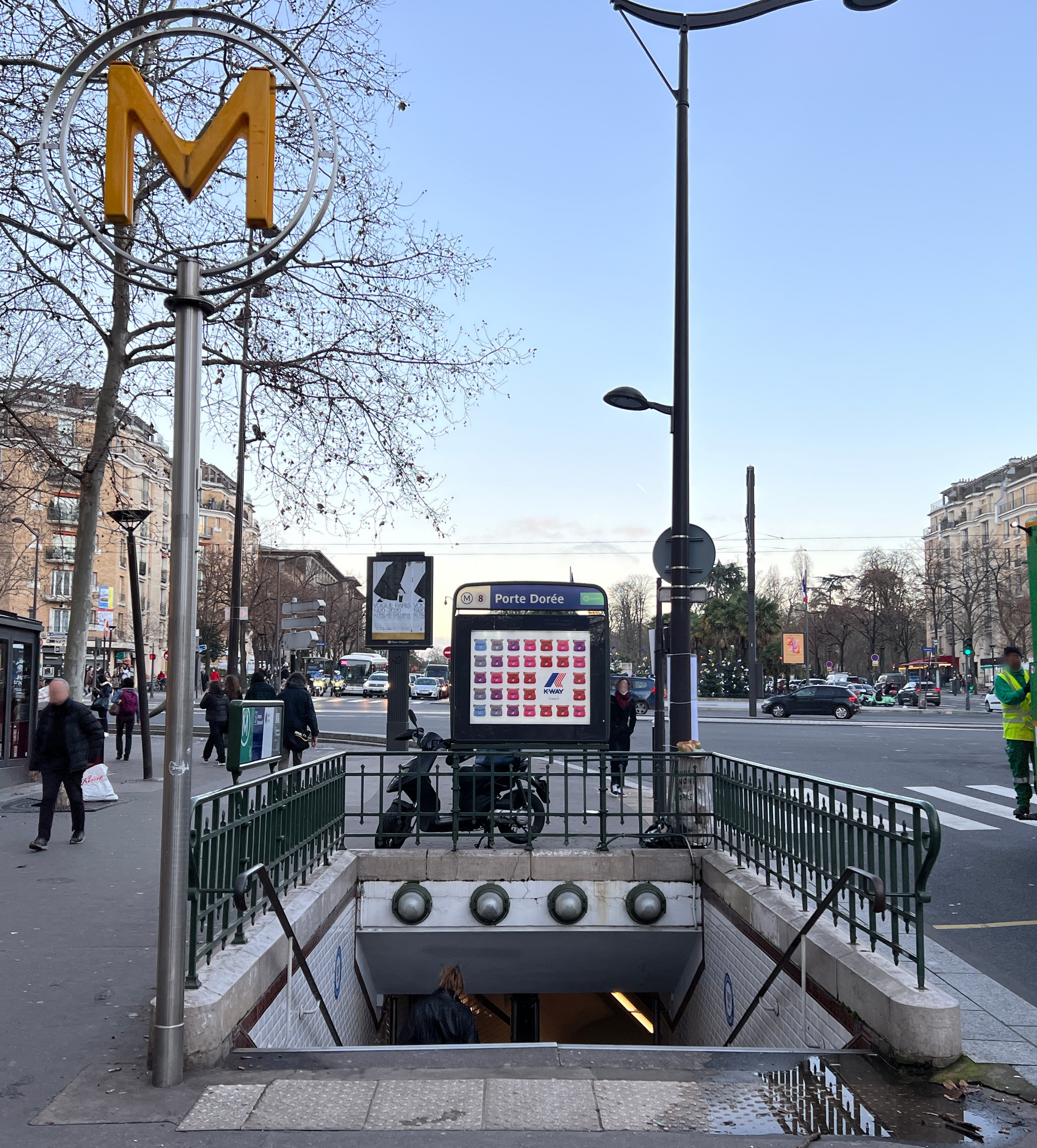
Access 2

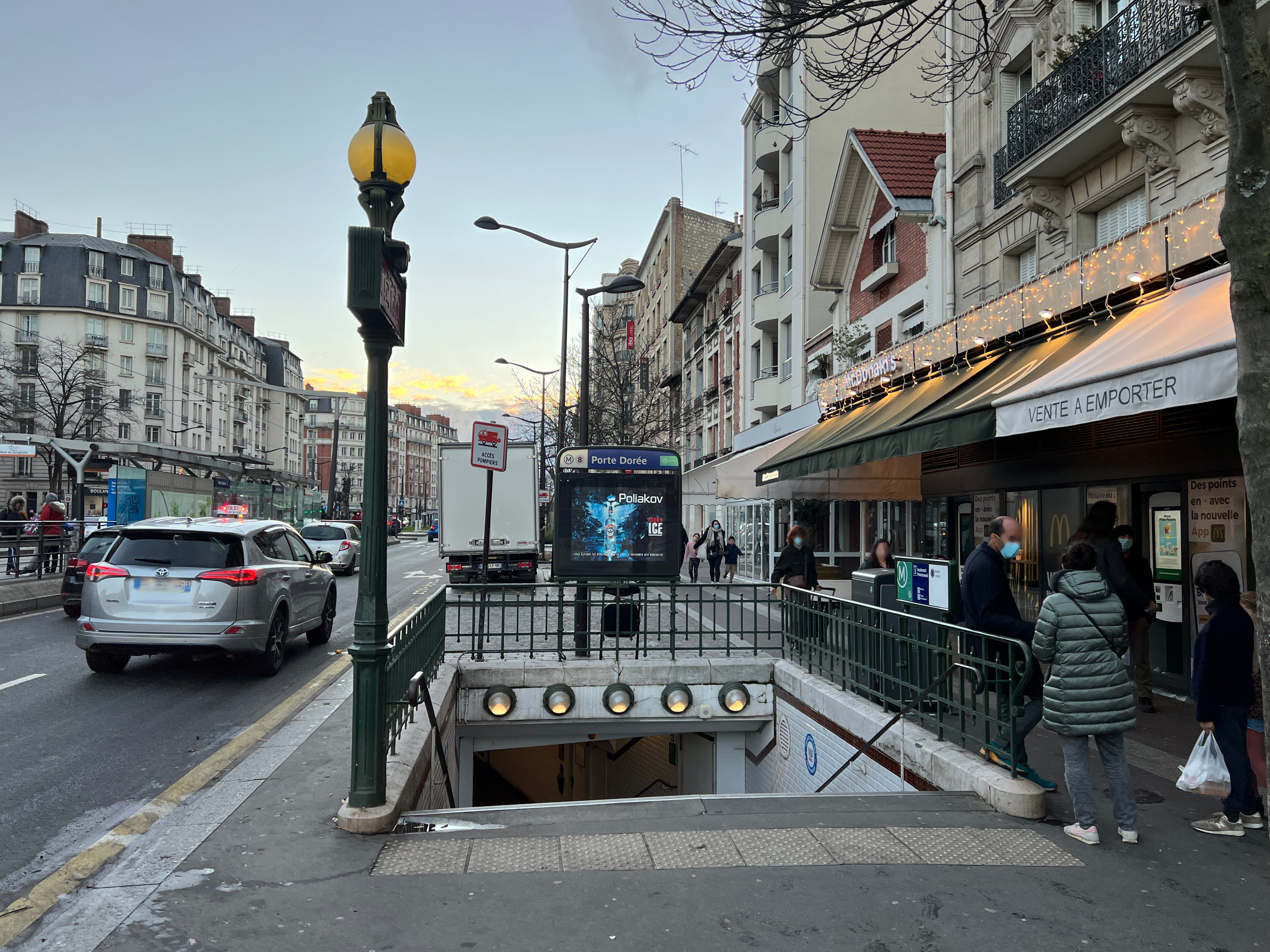
Access 3

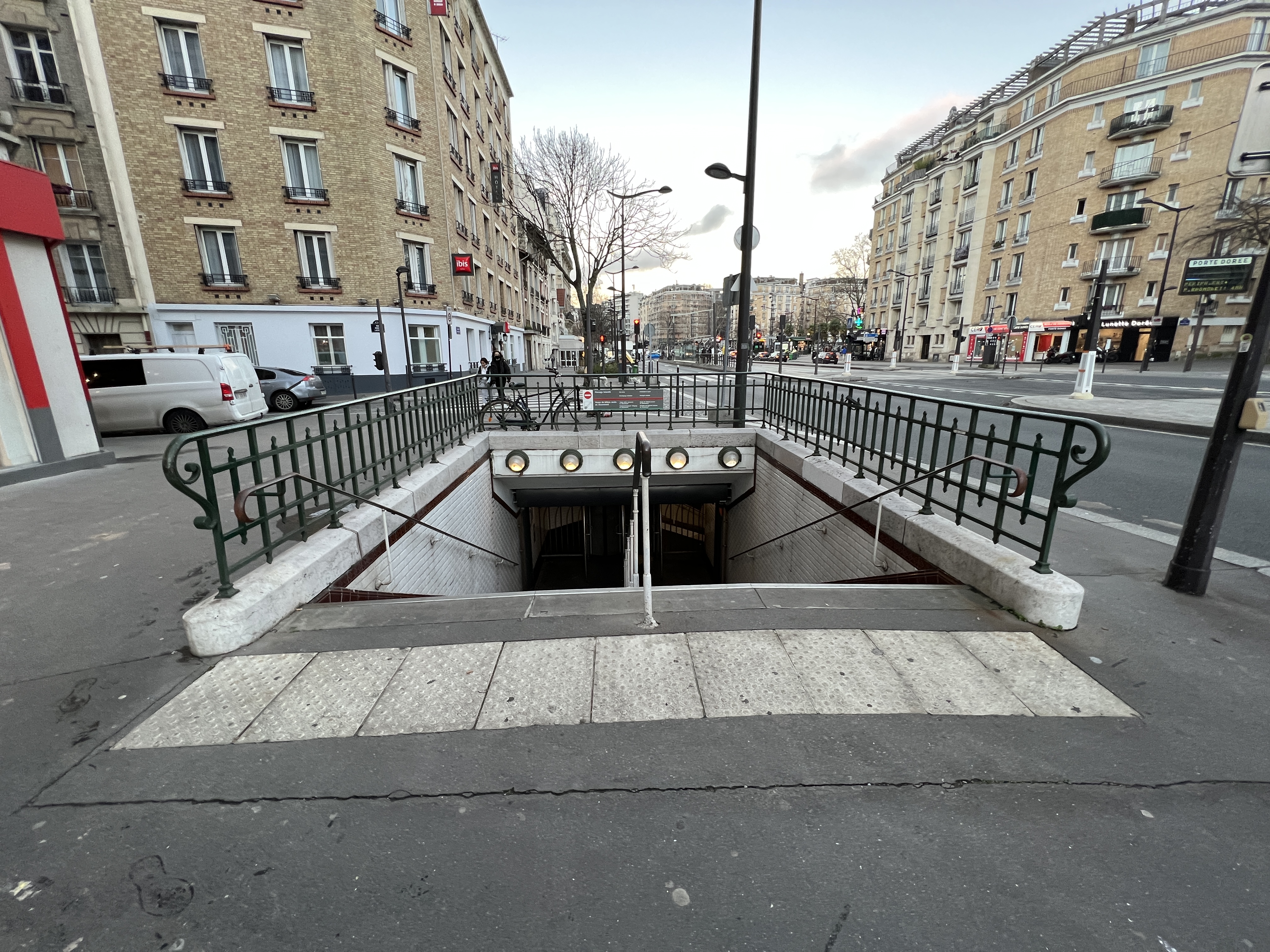
Access 4

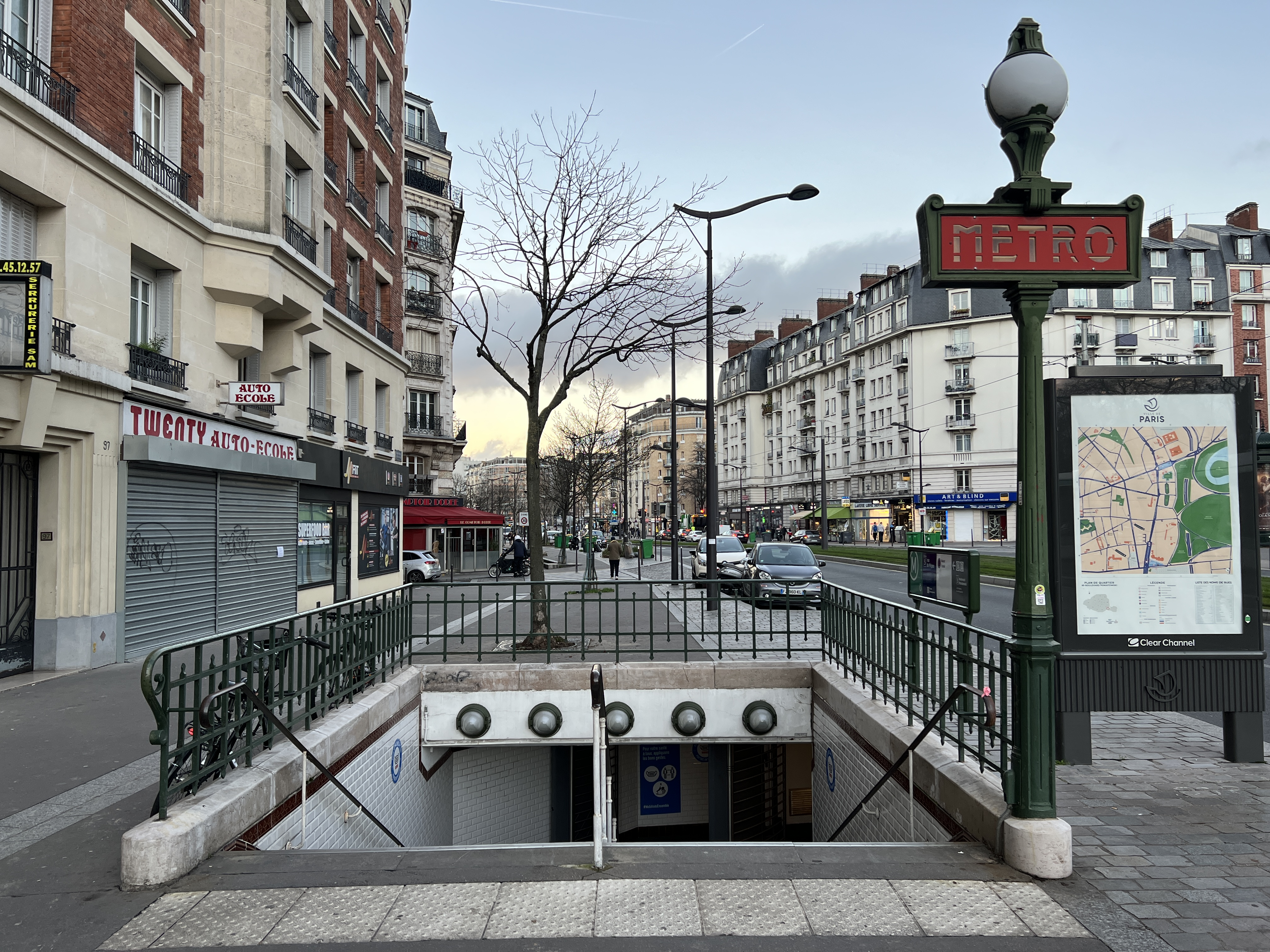
Access 5

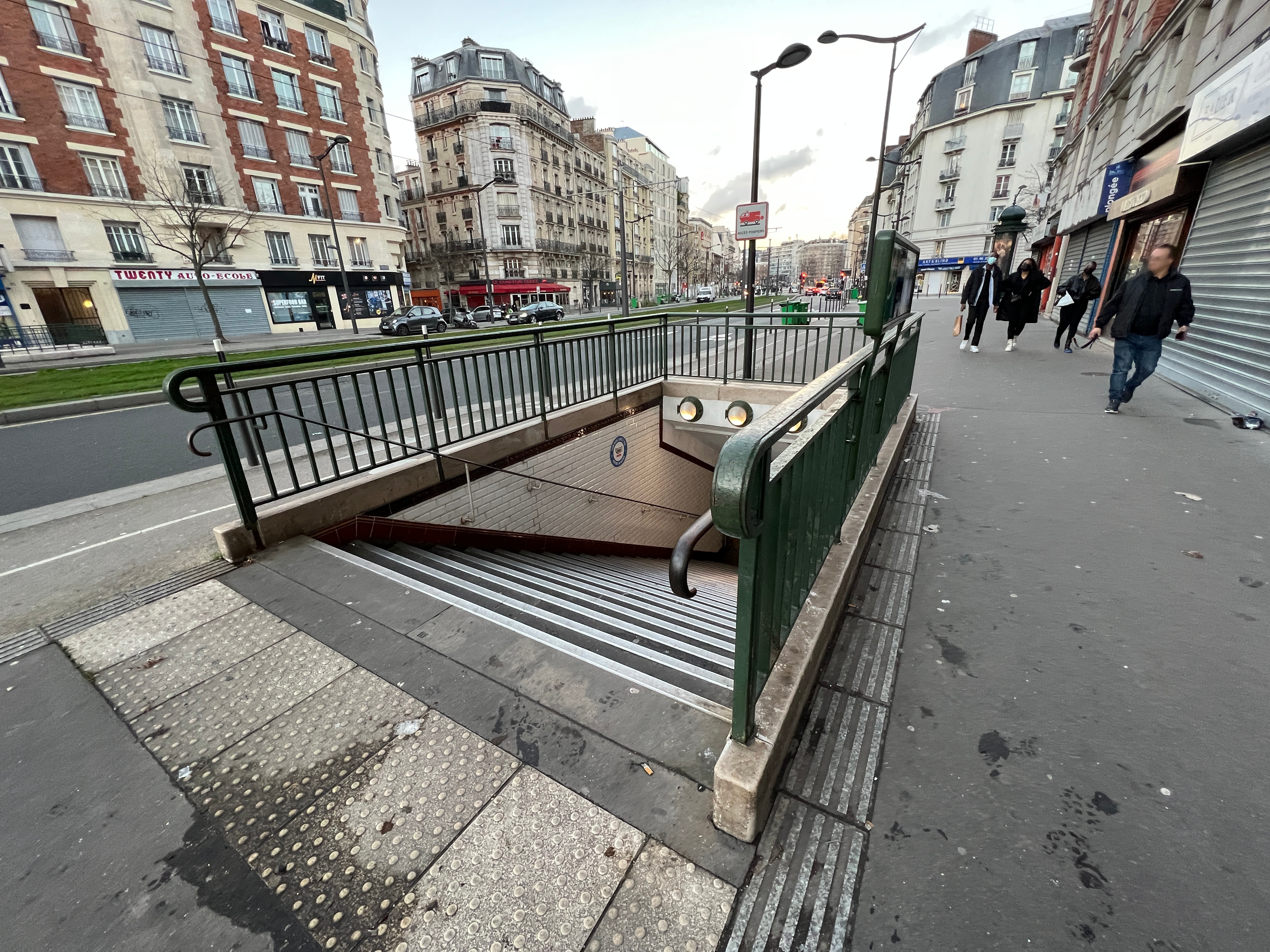
Access 6

== See also ==
- Murder of Lætitia Toureaux (1937)

== Sources ==
- Roland, Gérard (2003). Stations de métro. D'Abbesses à Wagram. Éditions Bonneton.
