= Dugommier station =

Metro station in Paris, France

Dugommier
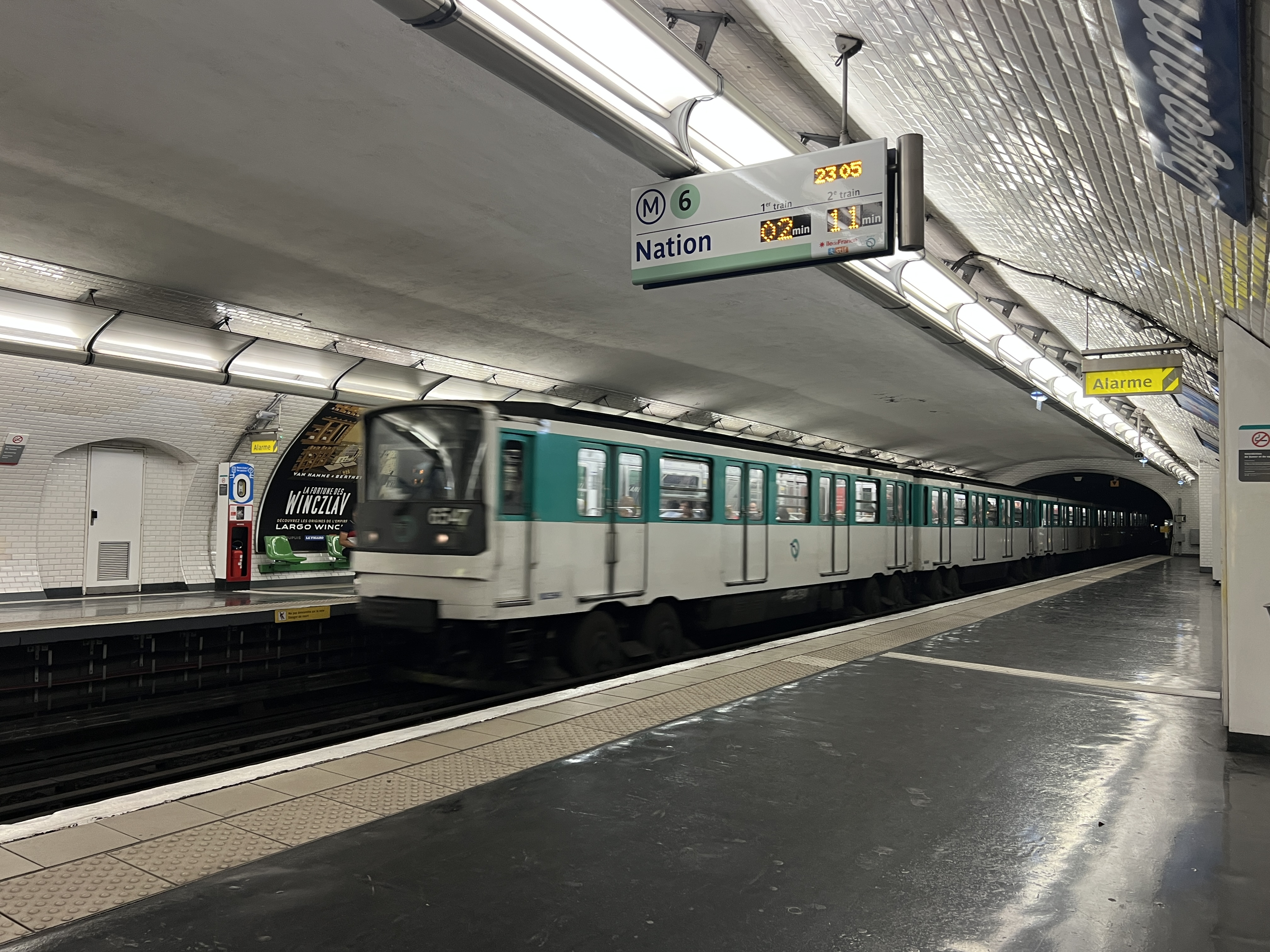

General information
- Location: 12th arrondissement of Paris; Île-de-France; France
- Coordinates: 48°50′20.58″N 2°23′23.87″E
- System: Paris Métro station
- Owner: RATP
- Operator: RATP

Other information
- Fare zone: 1

History
- Opened: 1 March 1909

Services
Preceding station	Paris Metro	Following station
Bercy towards Charles de Gaulle–Étoile	Line 6	Daumesnil towards Nation
Location
- Location within Paris

Dugommier (French pronunciation: [dyɡɔmje]) is a station of the Paris Métro on Line 6 in the 12th arrondissement.

== History ==
The station opened on 1 March 1909 with the opening of the original section of Line 6 from Place d'Italie to Nation. It was initially named Charenton, due to its proximity to the Rue de Charenton, an artery which ran from Bastille to the suburban town of Charenton-le-Pont. On 12 July 1939, it was renamed after the nearby Rue Dugommier to avoid confusion: a station at Porte de Charenton had been added to the system in 1931, and another at Charenton-le-Pont would open in 1942.

The street was named after Jacques François Coquille, known as Dugommier (1738–1794), an army officer from a Guadeloupe planter family who rose to general during the French Revolutionary wars.The station is located under the site of the Barrière de Charenton, a tollgate for the collection of municipal import taxes in the Wall of the Farmers-General, which was built in 1784-88 and demolished in 1860.

As part of RATP's Renouveau du Métro programme, the station corridors and platform lighting were renovated by 29 November 2002. In 2021, attendance is gradually rising, with 1,725,412 passengers entering this station, placing it in the 204th position of metro stations for its usage.

== Passenger services ==
=== Access ===
The station has a single access called Boulevard de Reuilly, consisting of a fixed staircase decorated with a mast with a yellow M inscribed in a circle and a Dervaux-type balustrade, leading to the right of no.1 of this boulevard.

=== Station layout ===
Street Level

B1	Mezzanine for platform connection

Platform level	Side platform, doors will open on the right
Platform level	toward Charles de Gaulle – Étoile	← toward Charles de Gaulle–Étoile (Bercy)
Platform level	toward Nation	toward Nation (Daumesnil) →
Platform level	Side platform, doors will open on the right

=== Platforms ===
Dugommier is a station of standard configuration. It has two platforms separated by the metro tracks and the vault is elliptical. The decoration is of the style used for most metro stations. The lighting strips are white and rounded in the Gaudin style of the metro revival of the 2000s, and the bevelled white ceramic tiles cover the walls and tunnel exits. The vault is coated and painted white. The advertising frames are metallic, and the name of the station is inscribed in Parisine font on enamelled plates. The seats are Motte style and green. The stairs leading to the platforms are tiled, as well as the perimeter of the platforms and the floor under the seats.

=== Bus connections ===
The station is served by lines 71, 77, 87 and 215 of the RATP Bus Network.

== Nearby ==
300 meters (330 yards) to the north is the Promenade Plantée—a 4.5 kilometres (2.8 mi) long elevated linear park that follows an abandoned commuter railway trace (Ligne de Paris-Bastille à Marles-en-Brie) from the former Gare de la Bastille railway station to the Boulevard Périphérique. The railway's Gare de Reuilly station remains at the east end of Rue Dugommier, repurposed for municipal offices. 160 meters to the west, the SNCF railway corridor separates the neighborhood from the redeveloped Bercy district along the Seine.

== Gallery ==
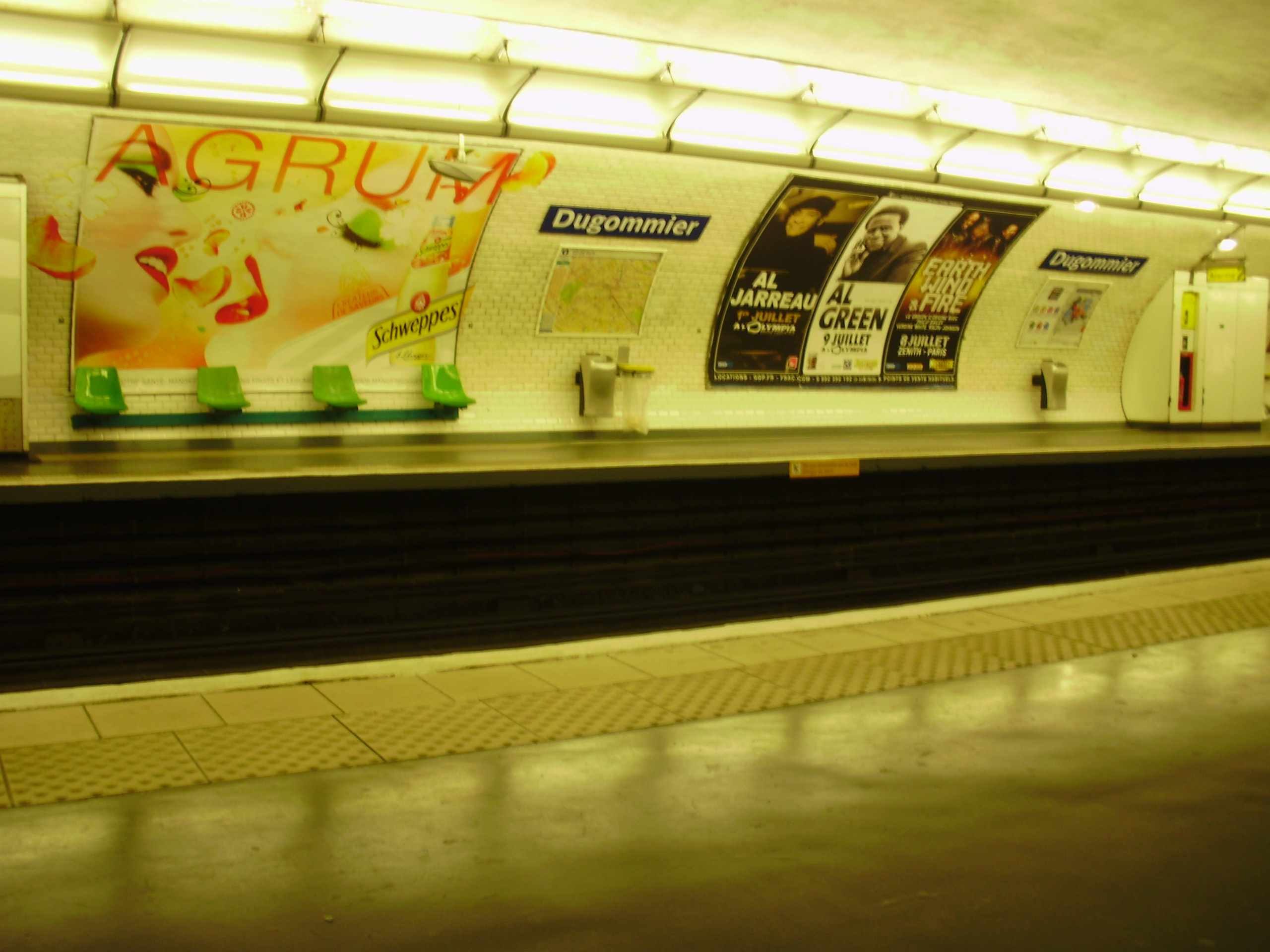
Line 6 platforms at Dugommier
