= Champ de Mars station (Paris Metro) =

Disused metro station in Paris, France

Champ de Mars
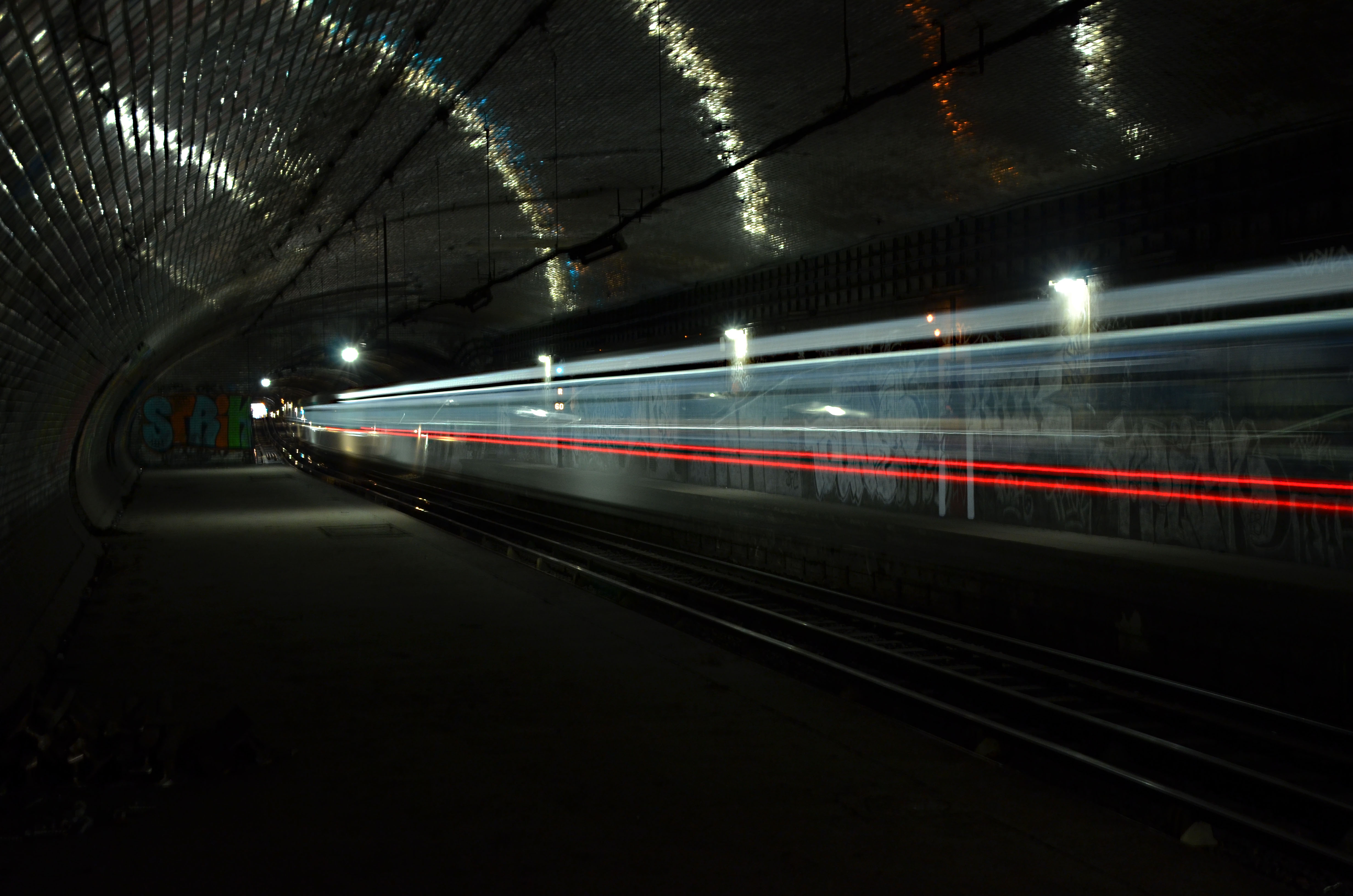
- Abandoned platforms

General information
- Location: Île-de-France; France
- Coordinates: 48°51′07″N 2°18′07″E
- System: Paris Métro station
- Owner: RATP
- Operator: RATP
- Line: Closed
- Platforms: 2 (2 side platforms)
- Tracks: 2

History
- Opened: 13 July 1913
- Closed: 2 September 1939
Location
- Location within Paris

Champ de Mars (French pronunciation: [ʃɑ̃ d(ə) maʁs]) is a ghost station on line 8 of the Paris Métro, between the stations of La Motte-Picquet–Grenelle and École Militaire. It is situated in the 7th arrondissement of Paris, to the southwest of Champ de Mars, a public garden, of which it is named after.

== History ==
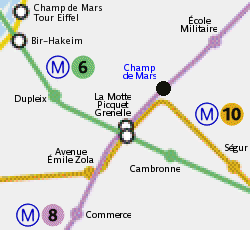
Location

The station opened as part of the initial section of the line 8 from Beaugrenelle (now Charles Michels on line 10) and Opéra on 13 July 1913.

On 2 September 1939, the station was closed as part of the government's plan that reduced service on the métro network as a cost-saving measure in light of the onset of World War II, with all but 85 stations closed. Most reopened after the war, and although it also was reopened, the station was eventually closed again due to its light traffic which made it unprofitable to operate, hence, becoming a ghost station.

In the early 1960s, more than twenty years later, it was still found on the official maps of the network by the RATP, as were the other closed stations at the time: Croix-Rouge, Arsenal, Saint-Martin, and Cluny. However, they were removed in subsequent maps since the 1970s, barring Cluny: it reopened as Cluny–La Sorbonne in 1988.

A siding and a track connection between lines 8 and 10 (towards the direction of Boulogne) exists south of the station.

The station originally had two accesses, on both sides of Place Joffre. The access on the Champ de Mars side still exists whereas the one on the École militaire side has been converted into a ventilation shaft to lower the temperature in the tunnels below.

Today, a station of line C of the RER is situated to the northwest of Champ de Mars, a public garden, has taken its name and is called Champ de Mars–Tour Eiffel, almost 1 kilometre away. It has a connection to line 6 at the Bir-Hakeim.

== Station layout ==
Street Level
B1	Mezzanine
Platform level	Side platform, not in service
Platform level	Southbound	← (No service southbound: La Motte-Picquet–Grenelle)
Platform level	Northbound	(No service northbound: École Militaire) →
Platform level	Side platform, not in service

== Gallery ==
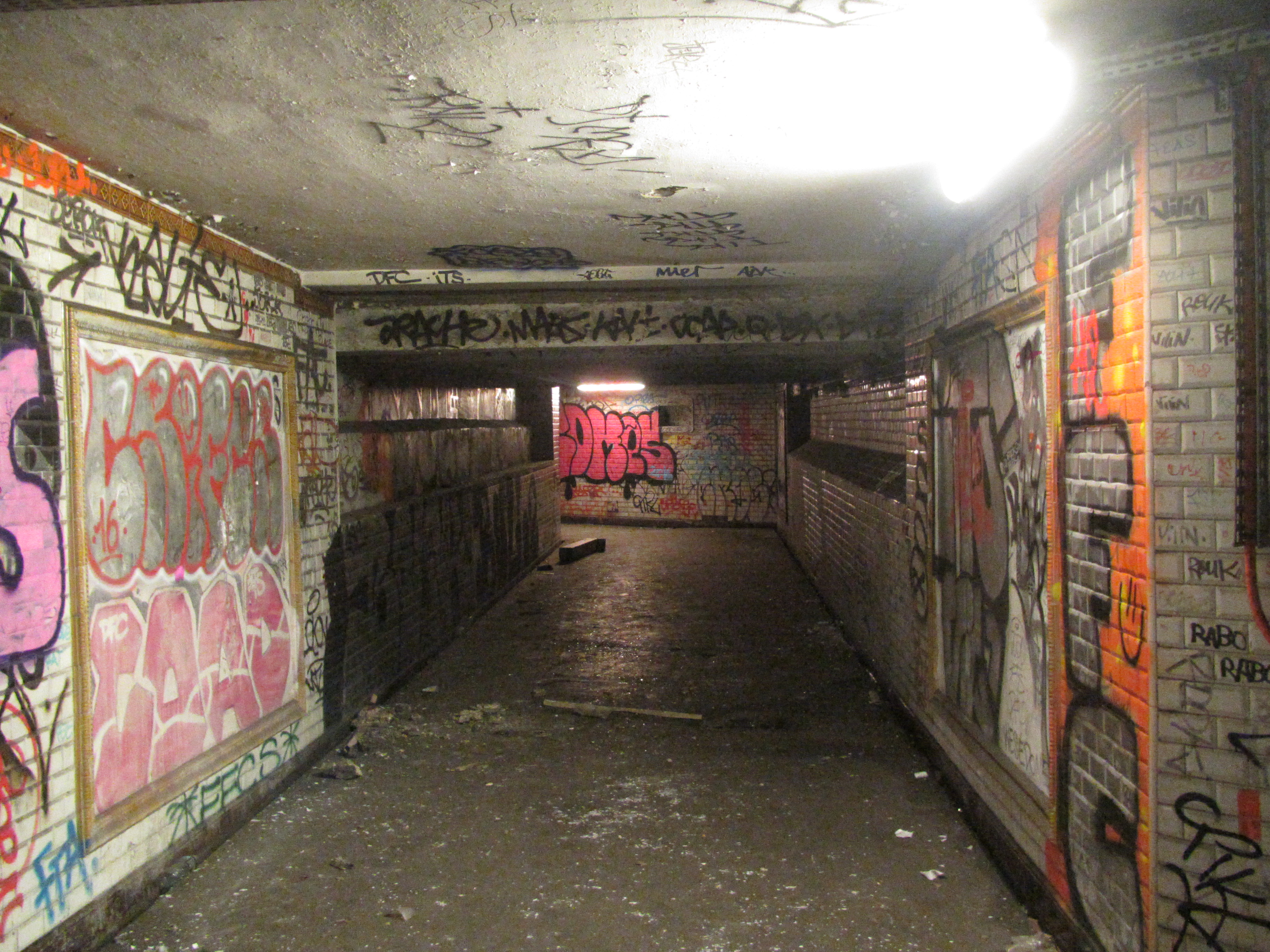
Corridor inside the station

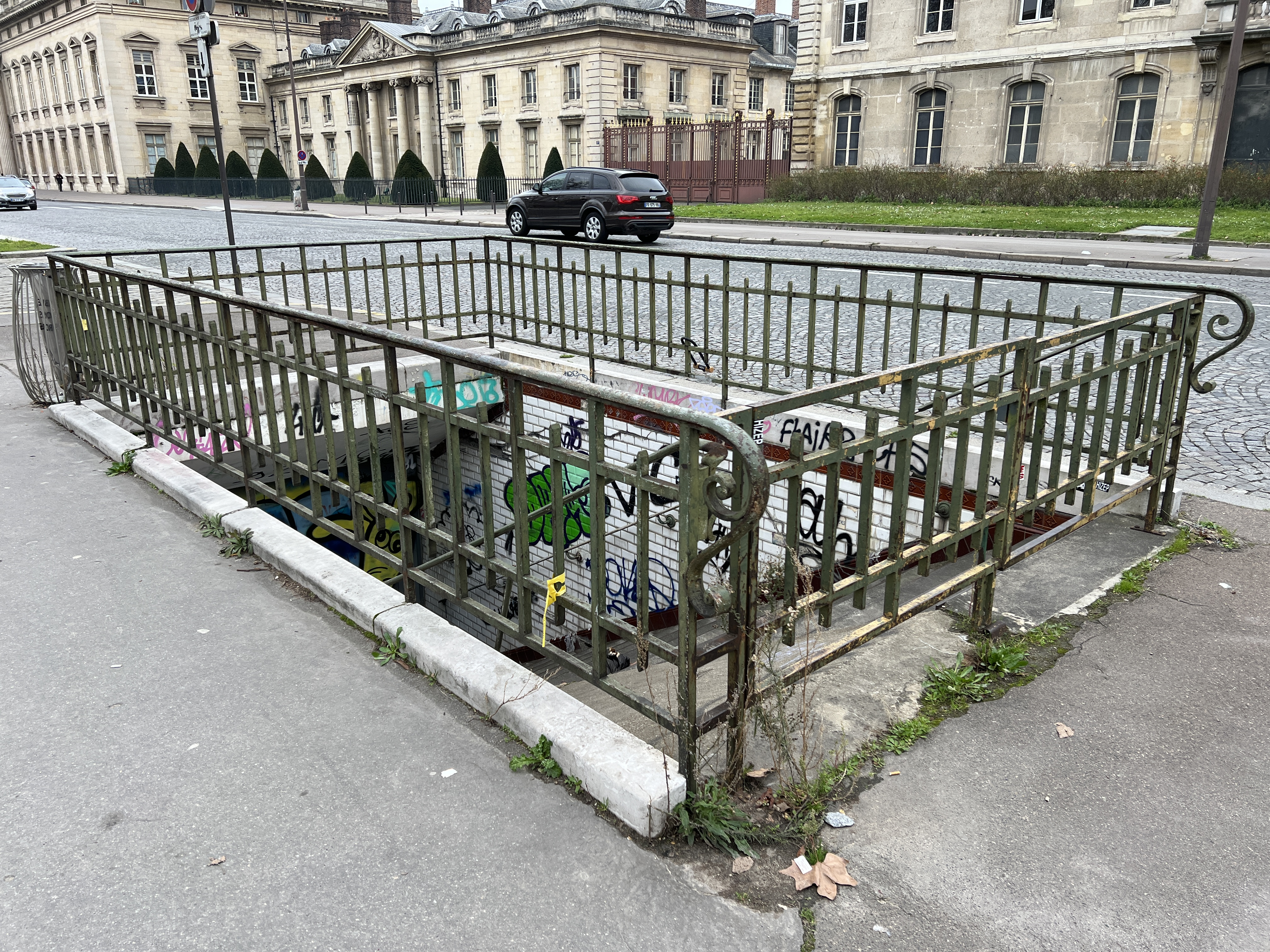
Disused access along Place Joffre
