= Faidherbe–Chaligny station =

Metro station in Paris, France

Faidherbe–Chaligny
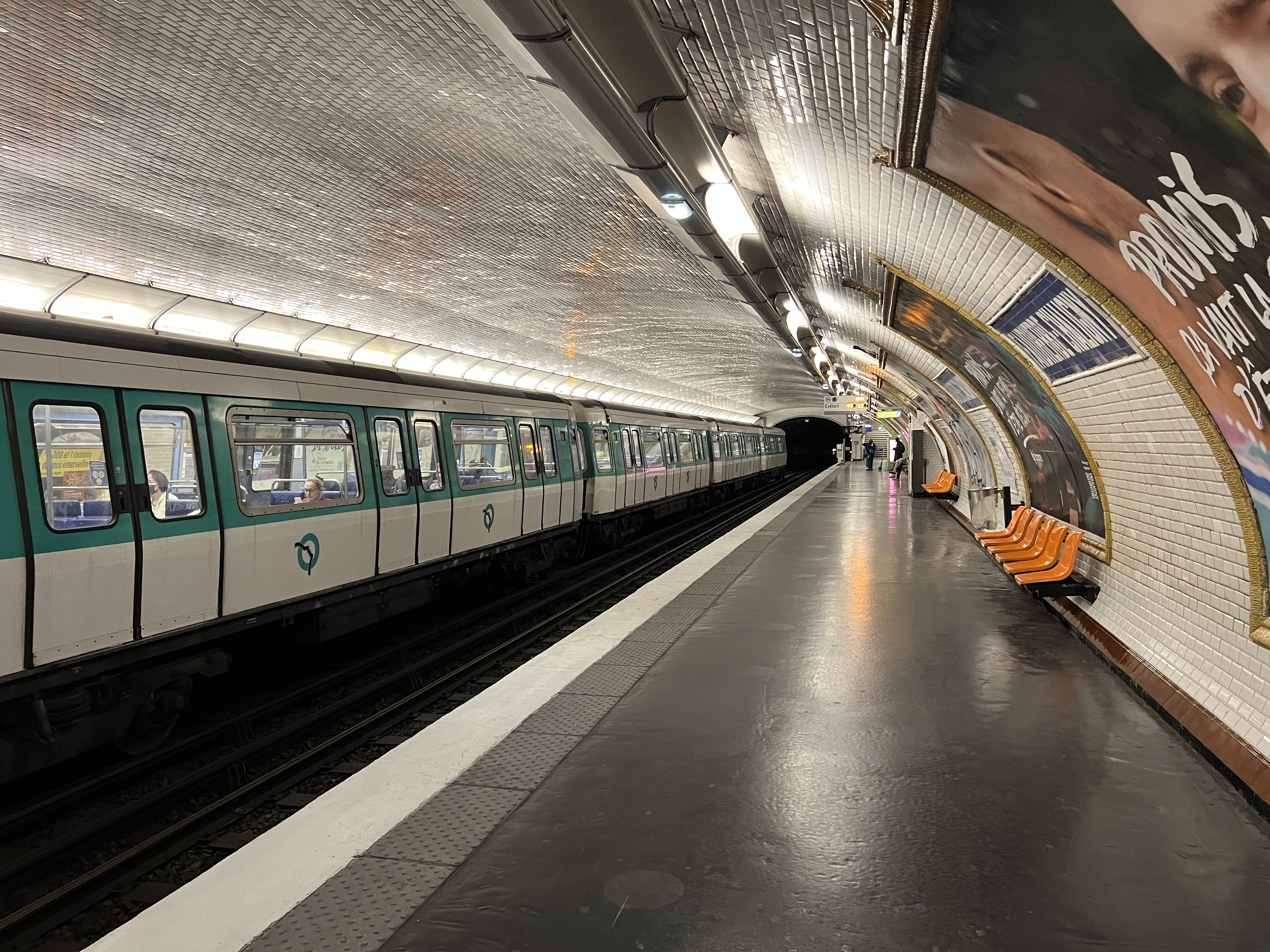

General information
- Location: 11th arrondissement of Paris; Île-de-France; France
- Coordinates: 48°51′01″N 2°23′00″E
- System: Paris Métro station
- Owner: RATP
- Operator: RATP
- Line: Paris Metro Paris Metro Line 8
- Platforms: 2 (side platforms)
- Tracks: 2

Construction
- Accessible: no

Other information
- Fare zone: 1

History
- Opened: 5 May 1931

Services
| Preceding station | Paris Metro | Following station |
|---|---|---|
| Ledru-Rollin towards Balard | Line 8 | Reuilly–Diderot towards Pointe du Lac |
Location
- Location within Paris

Faidherbe–Chaligny (French pronunciation: [fedɛʁb ʃaliɲi]) is a station on Line 8 of the Paris Métro, named after the streets of Rue Faidherbe and Rue Chaligny and located on the border of the 11th and 12th arrondissements.

== History ==
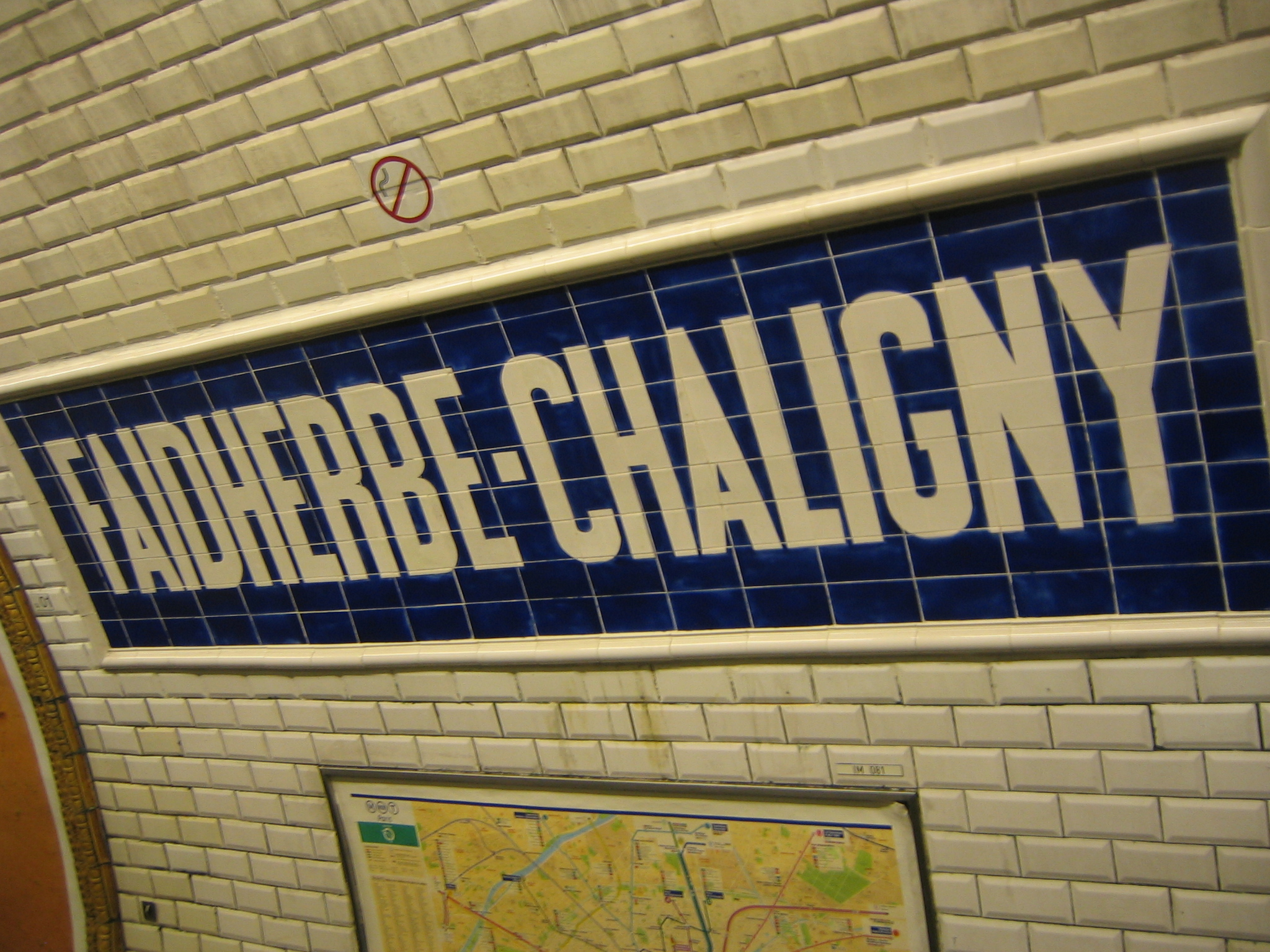
The station's sign as seen from the Metro platform

The station opened on 5 May 1931 with the extension of the line from Richelieu–Drouot to Porte de Charenton. Rue Faidherbe is named after General Louis Faidherbe (1818–1889), who was Governor of Senegal between 1854 and 1861 and between 1863 and 1865. Rue Chaligny is named after the Chalignys who were a famous family of metal-founders from Lorraine.

The royal wallpaper factory, the Folie Titon, run by Jean-Baptiste Réveillon, was located here until its demolition in 1880. It helped the Montgolfier brothers build hot-air balloons, which were first tested here with humans on 19 October 1783, although the balloon was tethered to the ground. The Reveillon riot occurred at the Folie Titon on 28 April 1789, which was a harbinger of the French Revolution.

As part of the RATP's Renouveau du métro revival programme, the station's corridors and platform lighting were renovated by 15 July 2008.

== Passenger services ==
=== Access ===
The station has three entrances decorated with Dervaux candelabra:

- Access no. 1 - Rue Faidherbe - hôpital Saint-Antoine: a fixed staircase doubled by an escalator going up, leading to the central median between Rue du Faubourg-Saint-Antoine and Rue de Montreuil, to the right of nos. 1 and 3 of the latter;
- Access no. 2 Rue Chaligny: a fixed staircase facing no. 31 Rue Chaligny;
- Access No. 3 Rue du Faubourg-Saint-Antoine: a fixed staircase located on the central median of Rue du Faubourg-Saint-Antoine to the right of No. 196.

=== Station layout ===
Street Level

| B1 | Mezzanine for platform connection |

| Platform level | Side platform, doors will open on the right |
| Platform level | toward Balard | ← toward Balard (Ledru-Rollin) |
| Platform level | toward Pointe du Lac | toward Pointe du Lac (Reuilly–Diderot) → |
| Platform level | Side platform, doors will open on the right |

=== Platforms ===
Faidherbe-Chaligny is a standard configuration station. It has two platforms separated by the metro tracks and the vault is elliptical. The decoration is in the style used for most metro station. The lighting canopies are white and rounded in the Gaudin style of the Renouveau du Métro of the 2000s, and the bevelled white ceramic tiles cover the right walls, the vault and the tunnel exits. The advertising frames are made of honey-coloured earthenware and the name of the station is also in earthenware in the style of the original CMP. The Motte style seats are orange in colour.

=== Bus connections ===
The station is served by lines 46 and 86 of the RATP Bus Network.

== Places of interest ==
- Nearby is the Fountain of Montreuil, created in 1719, which was used at that time to supply water to the butcheries in neighbouring Faubourg Saint-Antoine.
- The district preserved artisanal trades, particularly ironwork and cabinet-making.
- The principal entry to the Saint-Antoine Hospital is between the two metro entrances.
- Many small restaurants surround the station.
- The Palace of Woman, a reception centre for single women, is at the end of the Rue de Faidherbe.
