= Ledru-Rollin station =

Metro station in Paris, France

Ledru-Rollin
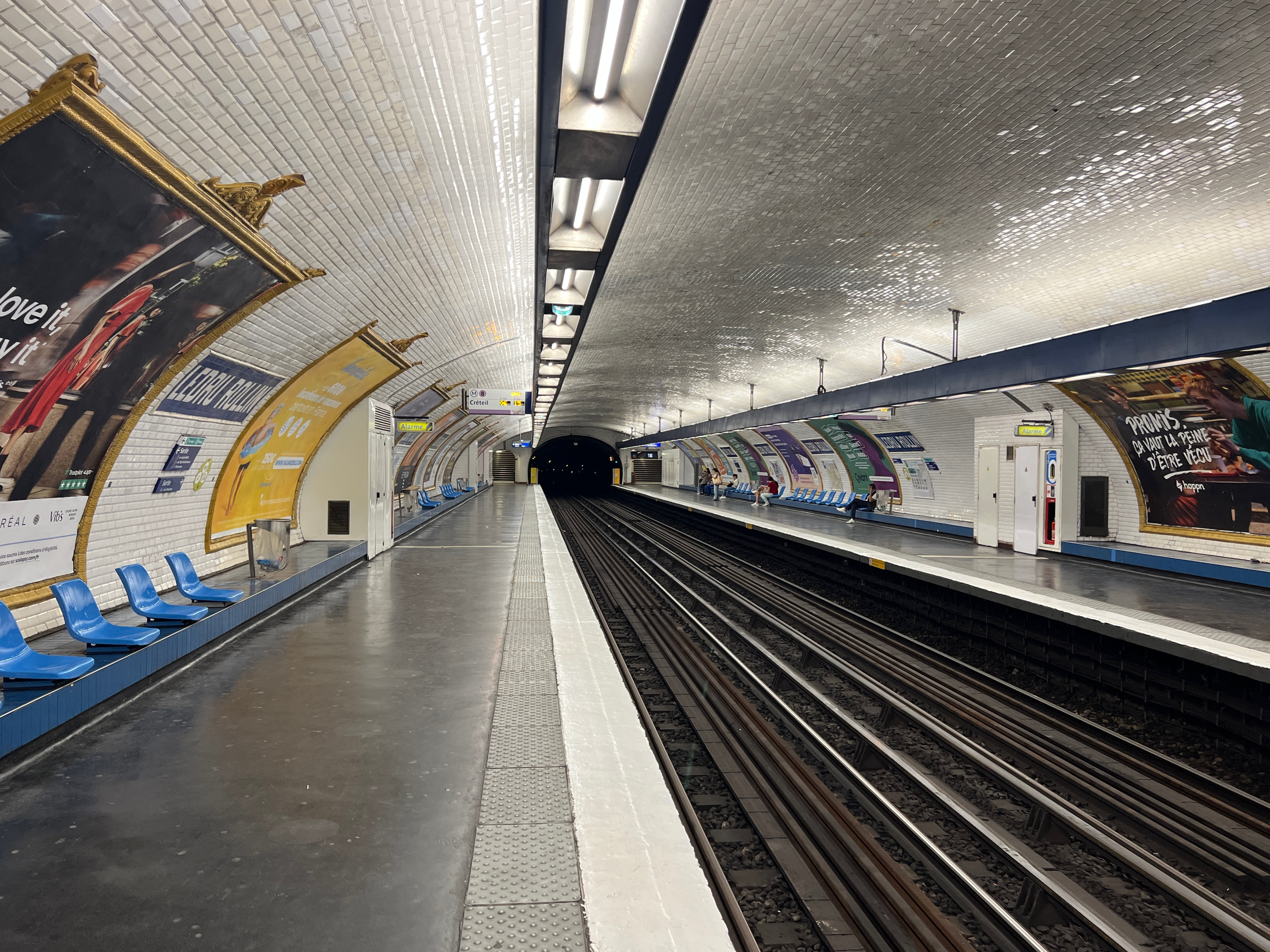
- Platforms

General information
- Location: Rue du Faubourg-Saint-Antoine x Av. Ledru-Rollin; 11th and 12th arrondissement of Paris; Île-de-France; France
- Coordinates: 48°51′06″N 2°22′31″E
- System: Paris Métro station
- Owner: RATP
- Operator: RATP

Other information
- Fare zone: 1

History
- Opened: 5 May 1931

Services
Preceding station	Paris Metro	Following station
Bastille towards Balard	Line 8	Faidherbe–Chaligny towards Pointe du Lac
Location
- Location within Paris

Ledru-Rollin (French pronunciation: [lədʁy ʁɔlɛ̃]) is a station on Line 8 of the Paris Métro. It is located at the intersection of the Rue du Faubourg-Saint-Antoine and Avenue Ledru-Rollin (after which it is named), on the border between the 11th arrondissement and 12th arrondissement.

== History ==
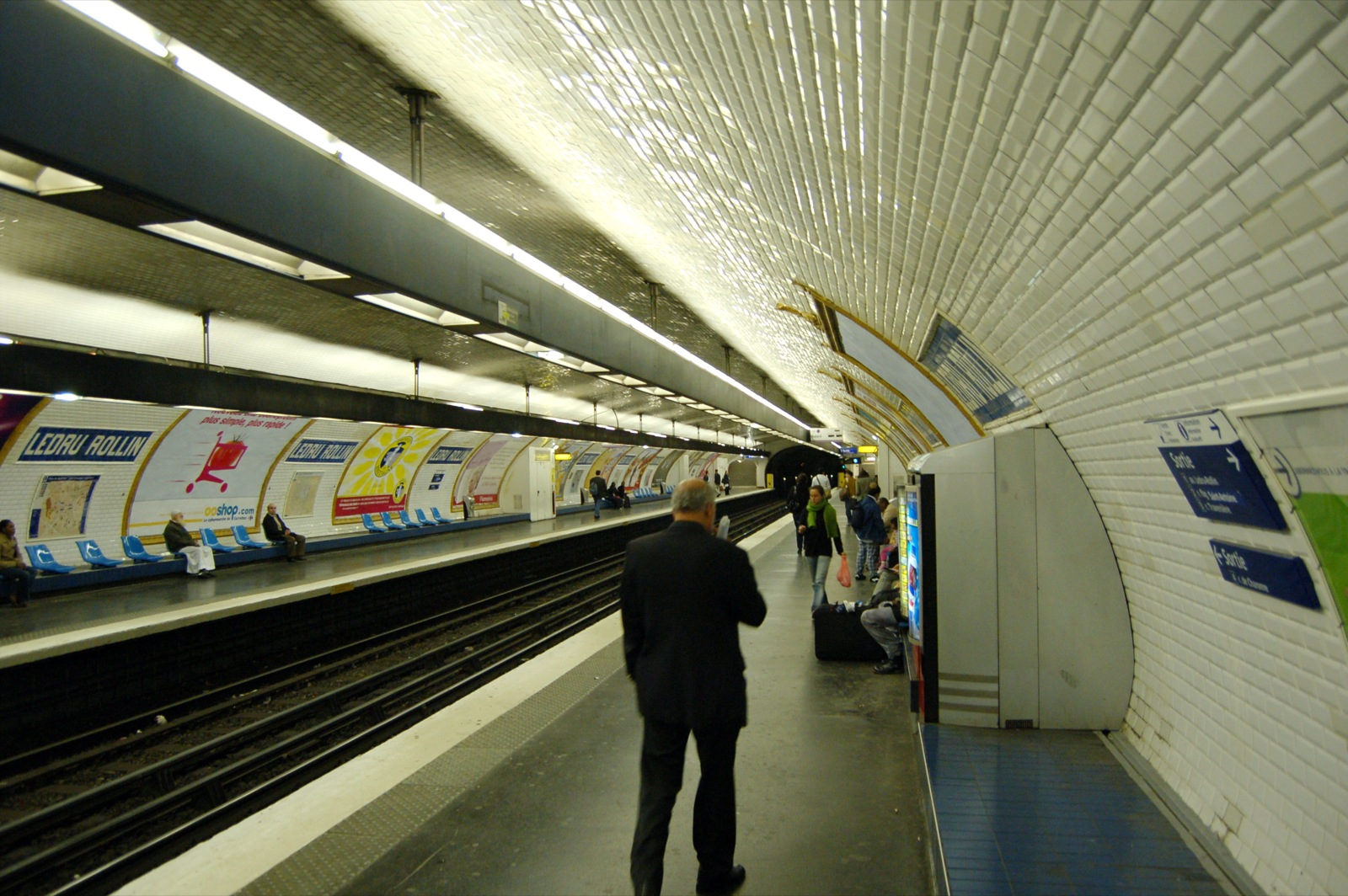
View of the station's platforms

The station opened on 5 May 1931 with the extension of the line from Richelieu – Drouot to Porte de Charenton. Avenue Ledru-Rollin is named after lawyer Alexandre Auguste Ledru-Rollin (1807–1874) who founded the newspaper La Réforme in 1843 and served as Minister of the Interior in 1848.

The station is one of three stops chosen as prototypes of the decorative Andreu-Motte style, with Pont-Neuf on line 7 and Voltaire on line 9, which was tested there in 1974. It is the model for those in dark blue.

As part of the RATP's Renouveau du metro revival programme, its corridors were renovated by 28 November 2002.

In 2013, 3,917,141 passengers used the station, making it the 128th busiest out of 302 on the Métro network.

== Passenger services ==
=== Access ===
The station has four accesses, each with two metro entrances (eight in total), all made up of fixed staircases with Dervaux-type balustrades:

- Access 1 Avenue Ledru-Rollin, embellished with a mast with a yellow M inscribed in a circle, leading to the right of no. 90 of the avenue;
- Access 2 Rue du Faubourg-Saint-Antoine, decorated with a Dervaux candelabra, facing no. 100 of this street;
- Access 3 Rue Traversière, with a yellow M mast, located to the right of no. 87 Avenue Ledru-Rollin;
- Access 4 Rue de Charonne, equipped with a Dervaux totem, opening opposite numbers 68 and 70 Rue du Faubourg-Saint-Antoine.

=== Station layout ===
Street Level

B1	Mezzanine for platform connection

Platform level	Side platform, doors will open on the right
Platform level	toward Balard	← toward Balard (Bastille)
Platform level	toward Pointe du Lac	toward Pointe du Lac (Faidherbe – Chaligny) →
Platform level	Side platform, doors will open on the right

=== Platforms ===
Ledru-Rollin is a standard configuration station. It has two platforms separated by the metro tracks and the vault is elliptical. The decoration is in the Andreu-Motte style with two blue light canopies, benches treated in flat blue tiles and blue Motte seats. These fittings are combined with the bevelled white ceramic tiles that cover the walls, the vault, the tunnel exits and the corridor outlets. The advertising frames are made of honey-coloured earthenware and the name of the station is also in earthenware in the style of the original CMP.

=== Bus connections ===
The station is served by lines 61, 76 and 86 of the RATP Bus Network and, at night, by lines N16 and N34 of the Noctilien network.

== Places of interest ==
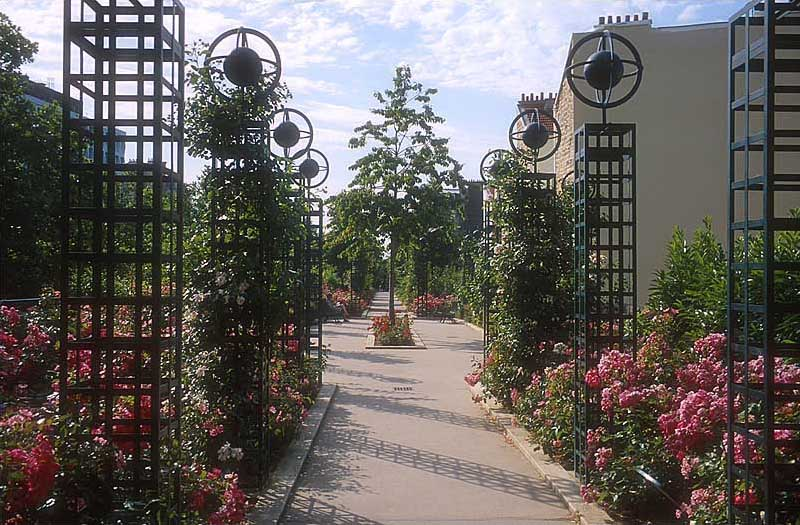
A view of the Promenade Plantée, looking west

The Promenade Plantée, a 4.5 km long elevated garden along the abandoned railway which led to the former Gare de La Bastille railway station, is located nearby. The Opéra Bastille, also served by Bastille station, is also close to Ledru-Rollin.
