= La Tour-Maubourg station =

Metro station in Paris, France

La Tour-Maubourg
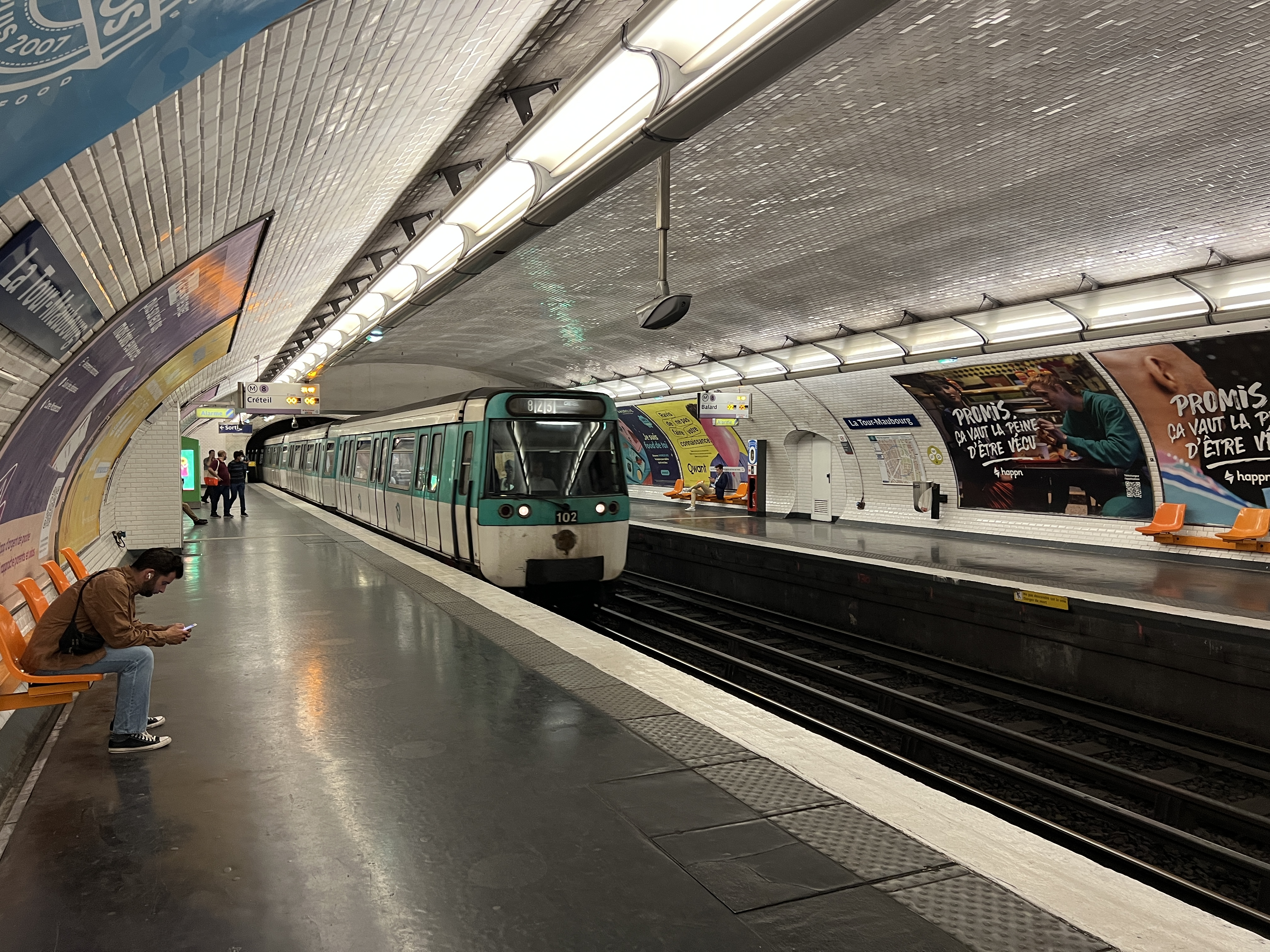
- MF 77 at La Tour-Maubourg

General information
- Location: 7th arrondissement of Paris; Île-de-France; France
- Coordinates: 48°51′28″N 2°18′37″E
- System: Paris Métro station
- Owner: RATP
- Operator: RATP
- Line: Paris Metro Paris Metro Line 8
- Platforms: 2 (side platforms)
- Tracks: 2

Construction
- Accessible: no

Other information
- Station code: 1008
- Fare zone: 1

History
- Opened: 13 July 1913

Passengers
- 1,361,723 (2021)

Services
Preceding station	Paris Metro	Following station
École Militaire towards Balard	Line 8	Invalides towards Pointe du Lac
Location
- Location within Paris

La Tour-Maubourg (French pronunciation: [la tuʁ mobuʁ]) is a station on Line 8 of the Paris Métro. It is located to the northwest of Hôtel des Invalides in the 7th arrondissement. It is named after the Boulevard de la Tour-Maubourg, which in turn is named after Victor de Fay de La Tour-Maubourg (1768–1850), a general in the First Empire and Minister of War after the Restoration. He also served as the governor of the nearby Hôtel des Invalides from 1821 to 1830.

== History ==
The station opened on 13 July 1913 as part of the initial section of the line from Beaugrenelle (now Charles Michels on Line 10) to Opéra.

As part of the "Un métro + beau" programme by the RATP, the station's corridors and platform lighting were renovated and modernised on 10 March 2006.

In 2019, the station was used by 2,139,593 passengers, making it the 236th busiest of the Métro network out of 302 stations. In 2020, the station was used by 965,136 passengers amidst the COVID-19 pandemic, making it the 245th busiest of the Métro network out of 304 stations.

In 2021, the station was used by 1,361,723 passengers, making it the 246th busiest of the Métro network out of 304 stations.

== Passenger services ==
=== Access ===
The station has 2 accesses:

- Access 1: Boulevard de la Tour-Maubourg
- Access 2: rue de Grenelle (an ascending escalator)

=== Station layout ===
Street Level
B1	Mezzanine
Platform level	Side platform, doors will open on the right
Platform level	Westbound	← toward Balard (École Militaire)
Platform level	Eastbound	toward Créteil–Pointe du Lac (Invalides) →
Platform level	Side platform, doors will open on the right

=== Platforms ===
The station has a standard configuration with 2 tracks surrounded by 2 side platforms. On the track leading towards Balard, just before entering the station, there is a track connection from the loop of the old Invalides workshops on line 13, formerly the terminal loop of the old line 14 that connected Invalides to Porte de Vanves.

=== Other connections ===
The station is also served by lines 28 and 69 of the RATP bus network.

== Nearby ==
- Église protestante Saint-Jean de Paris
- Église Saint-Pierre-du-Gros-Caillou
- Esplanade des Invalides
- Hôtel des Invalides
- Square Santiago-du-Chili

== Gallery ==
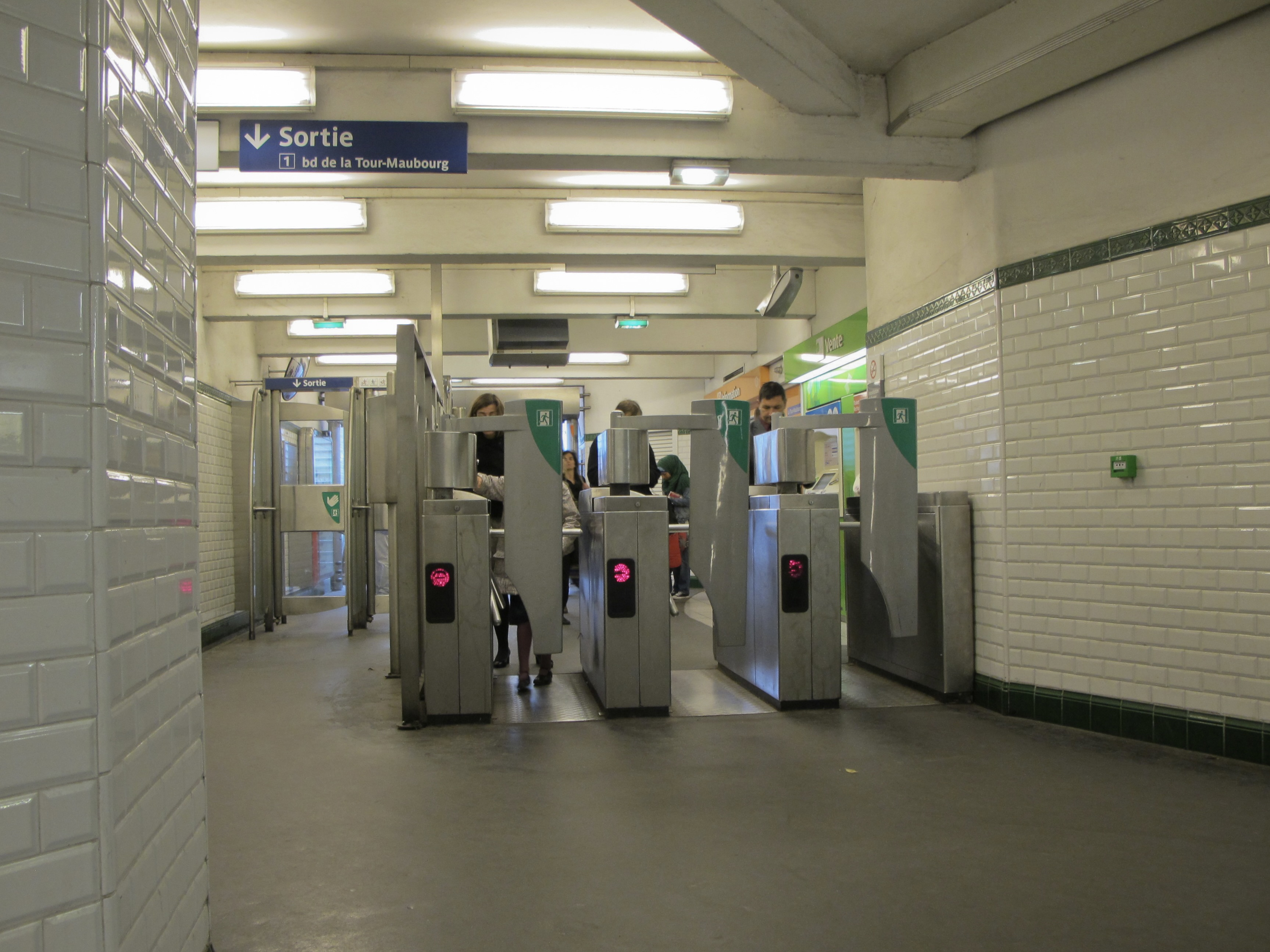
Ticket barriers at the mezzanine

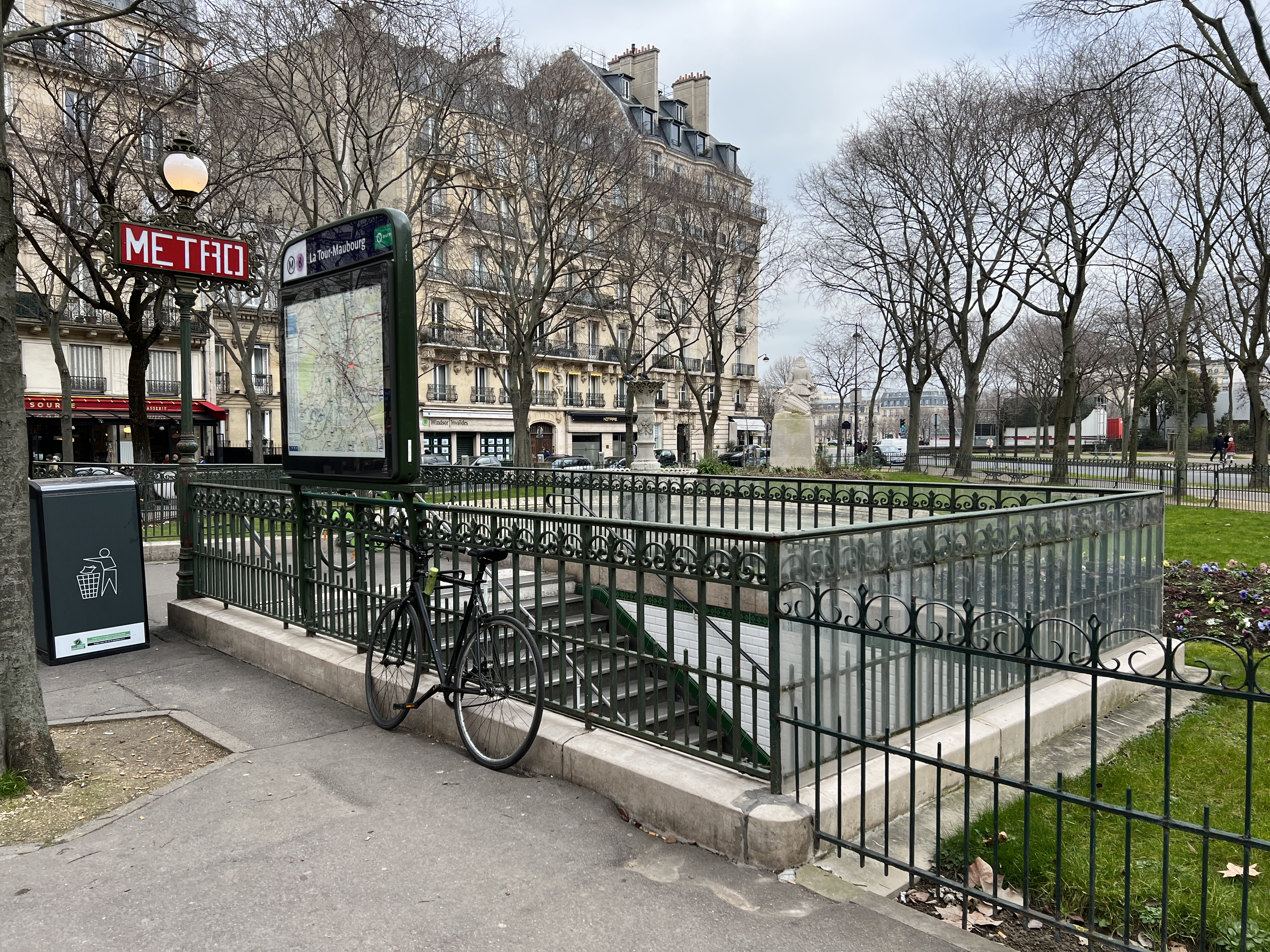
Access 1

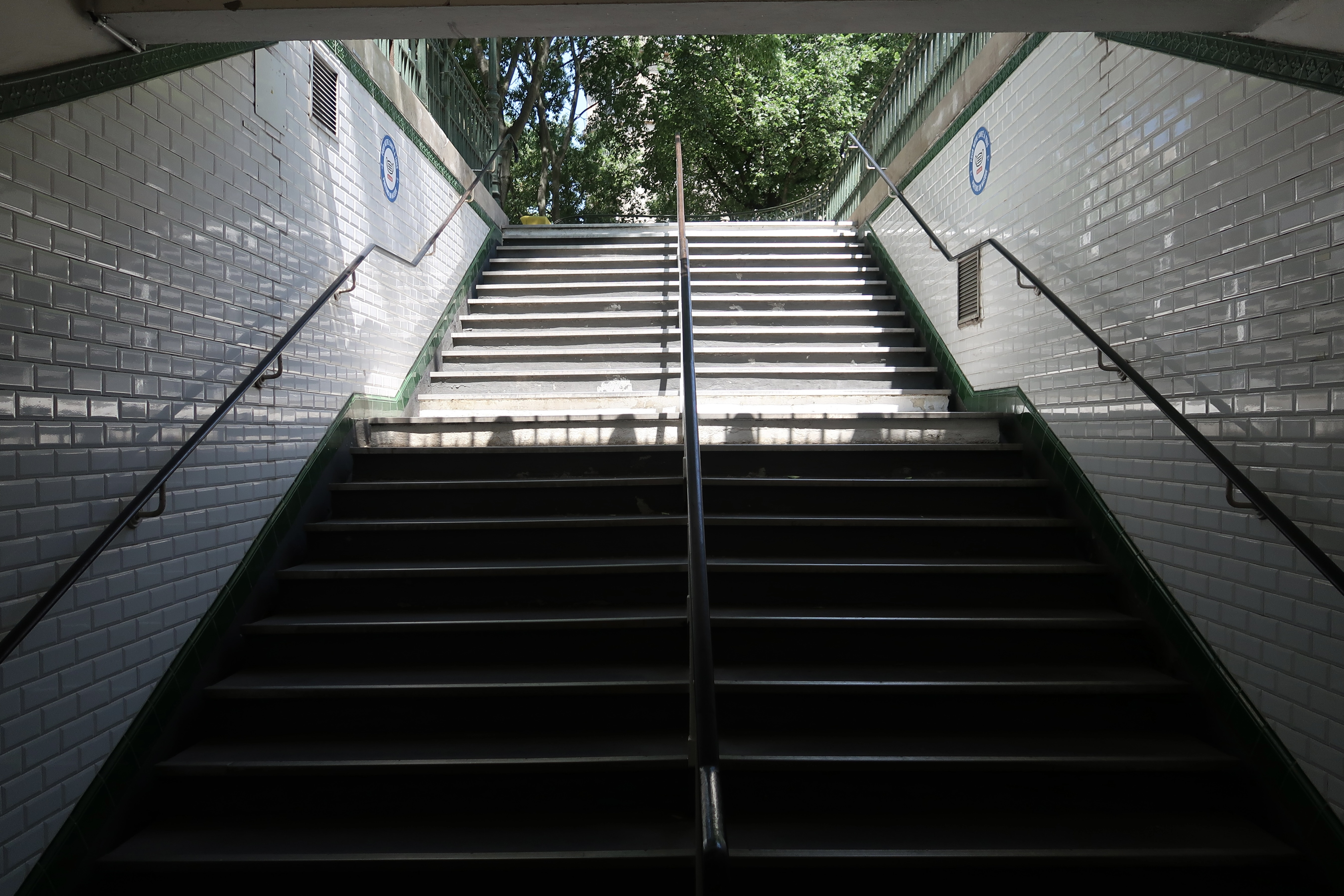
Another view of access 1

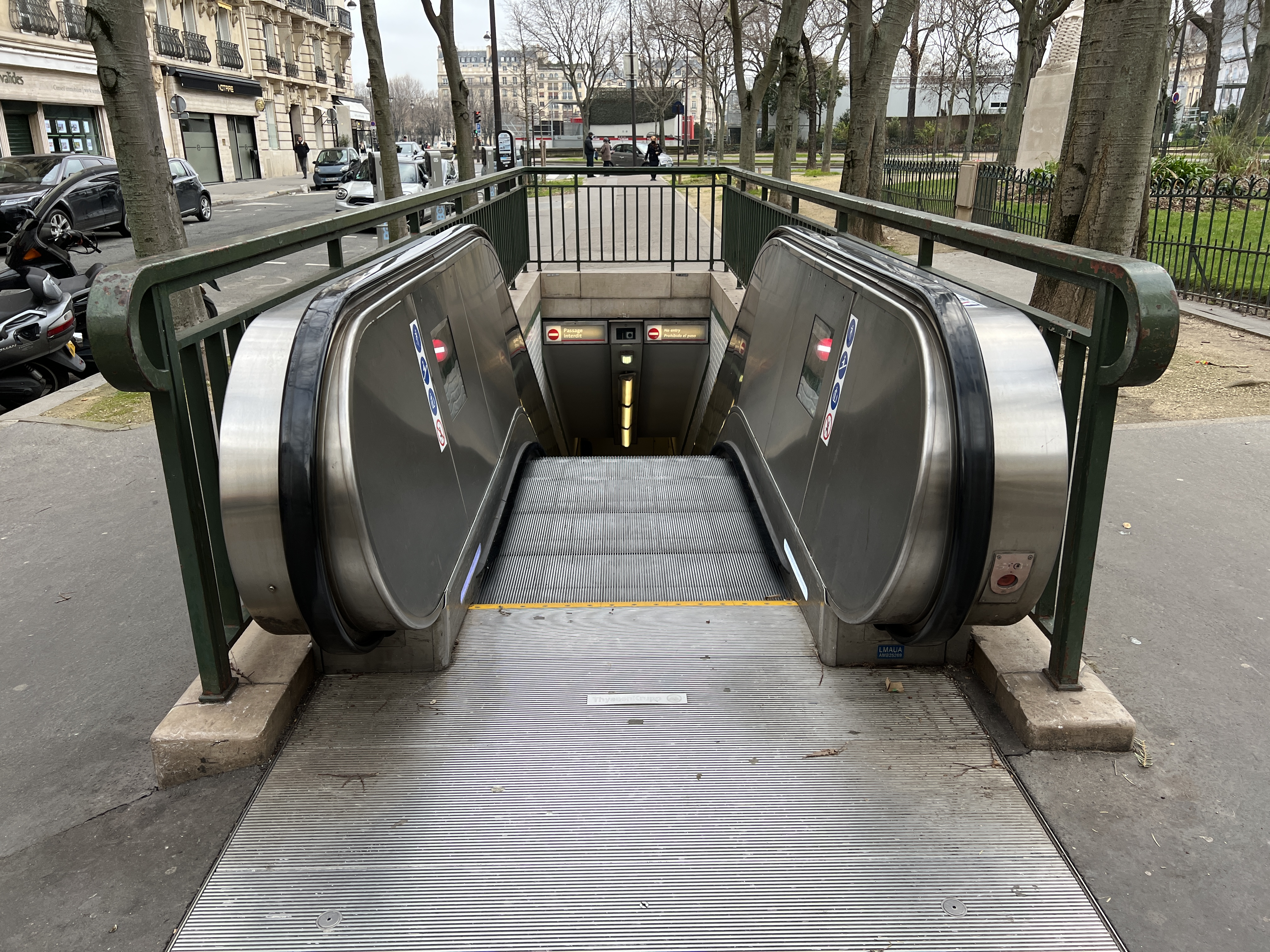
Access 2
