= École Militaire station =

Metro station in Paris, France

École Militaire
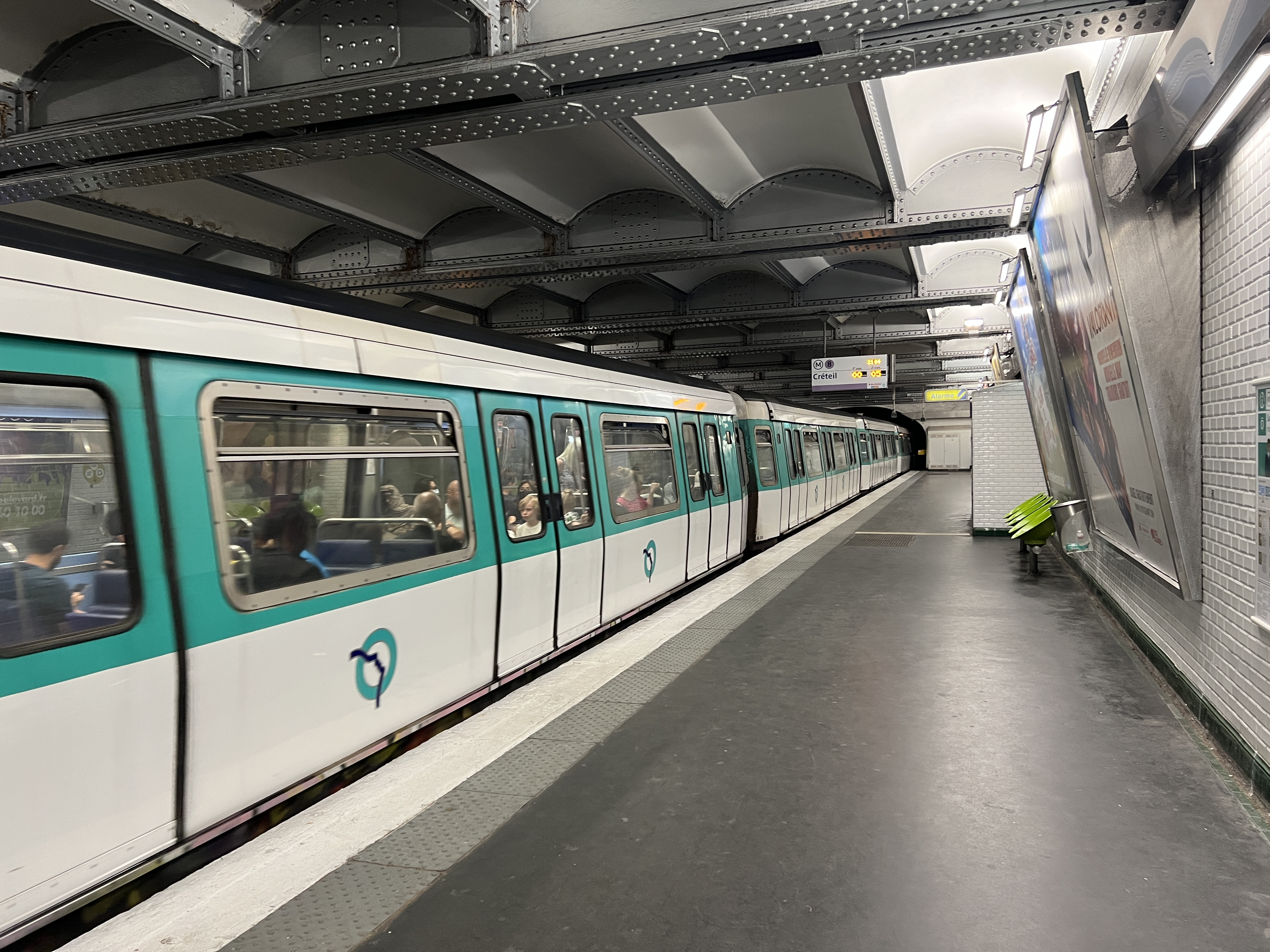
- Station view

General information
- Location: 7th arrondissement of Paris; Île-de-France; France
- Coordinates: 48°51′18″N 2°18′24″E
- System: Paris Métro station
- Owner: RATP
- Operator: RATP
- Line: Paris Metro Paris Metro Line 8
- Platforms: 2 (side platforms)
- Tracks: 2

Construction
- Accessible: no

Other information
- Fare zone: 1

History
- Opened: 13 July 1913

Services
Preceding station	Paris Metro	Following station
La Motte-Picquet–Grenelle towards Balard	Line 8	La Tour-Maubourg towards Pointe du Lac
Location
- Location within Paris

École Militaire (French pronunciation: [ekɔl militɛːʁ]; lit. 'Military School') is a station on Line 8 of the Paris Métro. It is located north of and named after the École militaire in the 7th arrondissement.

== Location ==
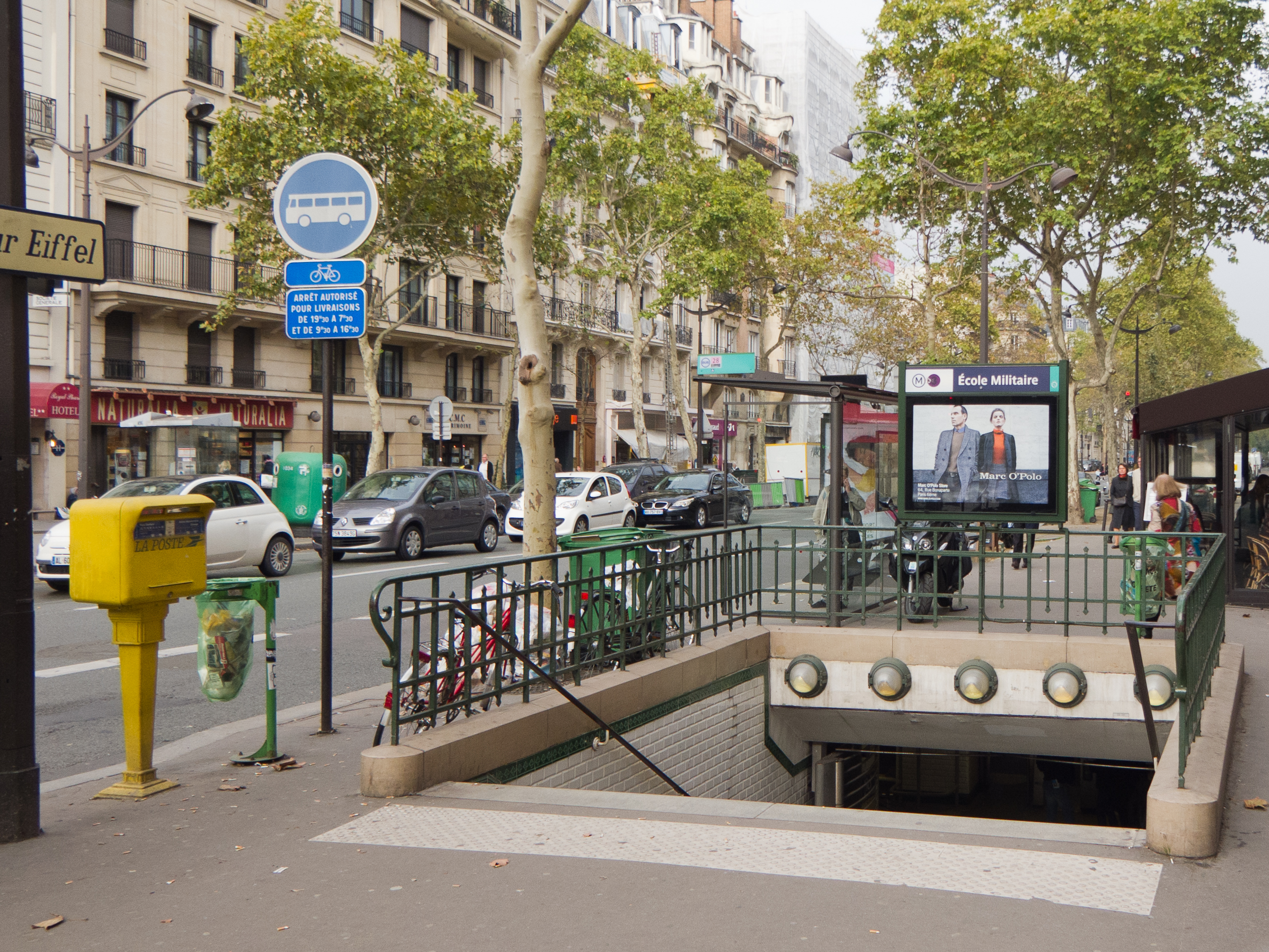
Station entrance

The station is located under Avenue de La Motte-Picquet, northeast of Place de l'École-Militaire. Oriented on a north-east/south-west axis, it is positioned between the La Motte-Picquet–Grenelle and La Tour-Maubourg Métro stations, but is separated from the latter by the current Champ de Mars ghost station.

== History ==
The station was opened on 13 July 1913 as part of the original section of Line 8 between Beaugrenelle (now Charles Michels, which is on Line 10) and Opéra.

It owes its name to its location north of the École militaire, at the end of the south-eastern perspective of the Champ de Mars. It was founded in 1750 on the proposal of the financier Joseph Paris Duverney, with the support of Madame de Pompadour, with the aim of creating an academic college for cadets of humble origins. On the grounds of the Grenelle farm, developed by Ange-Jacques Gabriel, construction began in 1752, but the school did not open until 1760. It received young Bonaparte as a pupil in 1784. Nowadays, the École militaire brings together all higher military education organisations.

From the 1950s until the 2000s, the station's walls were covered with a metallic panels with green horizontal uprights and golden and illuminated advertising frames. Subsequently, this arrangement was supplemented by Motte style seats, first in yellow, then green for colorimetric uniformity. As part of the RATP Renouveau du métro programme, the station corridors were renovated on 25 June 2004, then the platforms in 2007, resulting in the removal of their metal bodywork. This latest modernisation was completed in 2008.

On 9 October 2019, half of the nameplates on the station platforms were temporarily replaced by the RATP in order to celebrate the 60th anniversary of Asterix and Obelix, as in eleven other stations. Taking up in particular the characteristic typography of the comic strip by René Goscinny and Albert Uderzo, École Militaire was humorously renamed École Légionnaire in reference to the tenth book in the series, Astérix Légionnaire.

In 2019, 4,468,169 riders entered the station, which placed it at the 99th position out of 302 Métro stations for its use.

== Passenger services ==
=== Access ===
The station has three entrances:

- Entrance 1: Avenue Bosquet–Tour Eiffel, consisting of a fixed staircase adorned with a Dervaux candelabra, leading to 42 Avenue de La Motte-Picquet;
- Entrance 2: Avenue Duquesne–Hôtel des Invalides, consisting of a fixed staircase, located to the right of 41 Avenue de La Motte-Picquet;
- Entrance 3: Avenue de la Motte-Picquet, made up of an escalating escalator allowing only an exit from the platform in the direction of Balard, located opposite no. 36 of this avenue.

=== Station layout ===
Street Level

B1	Mezzanine for platform connection

Line 8 platform level	Side platform, doors will open on the right
Line 8 platform level	Westbound	← toward Balard (La Motte-Picquet–Grenelle)
Line 8 platform level	Eastbound	toward Créteil–Pointe du Lac (La Tour-Maubourg) →
Line 8 platform level	Side platform, doors will open on the right

=== Platforms ===
École Militaire is a standard configuration station. It has two platforms separated by the metro tracks. Established flush with the ground, the ceiling is made up of a metal deck, the silver-coloured beams of which are supported by vertical walls. The bevelled white ceramic tiles cover the walls, the tunnel exits and the outlets of the corridors. The metal advertising frames are tilted and the name of the station is inscribed in Parisine font on enamelled plates. The seats, in Akiko style, are green. The lighting is semi-direct, projected onto the walls, the advertising frames and the first row of ceiling vaults.

=== Bus connections ===
The station is served by lines 28, 80, 82, 86 and 92 of the RATP bus network.
