= Paris Metro Line 8 =

Subway route in the French capital

Line 8
- Paris Metro Line 8
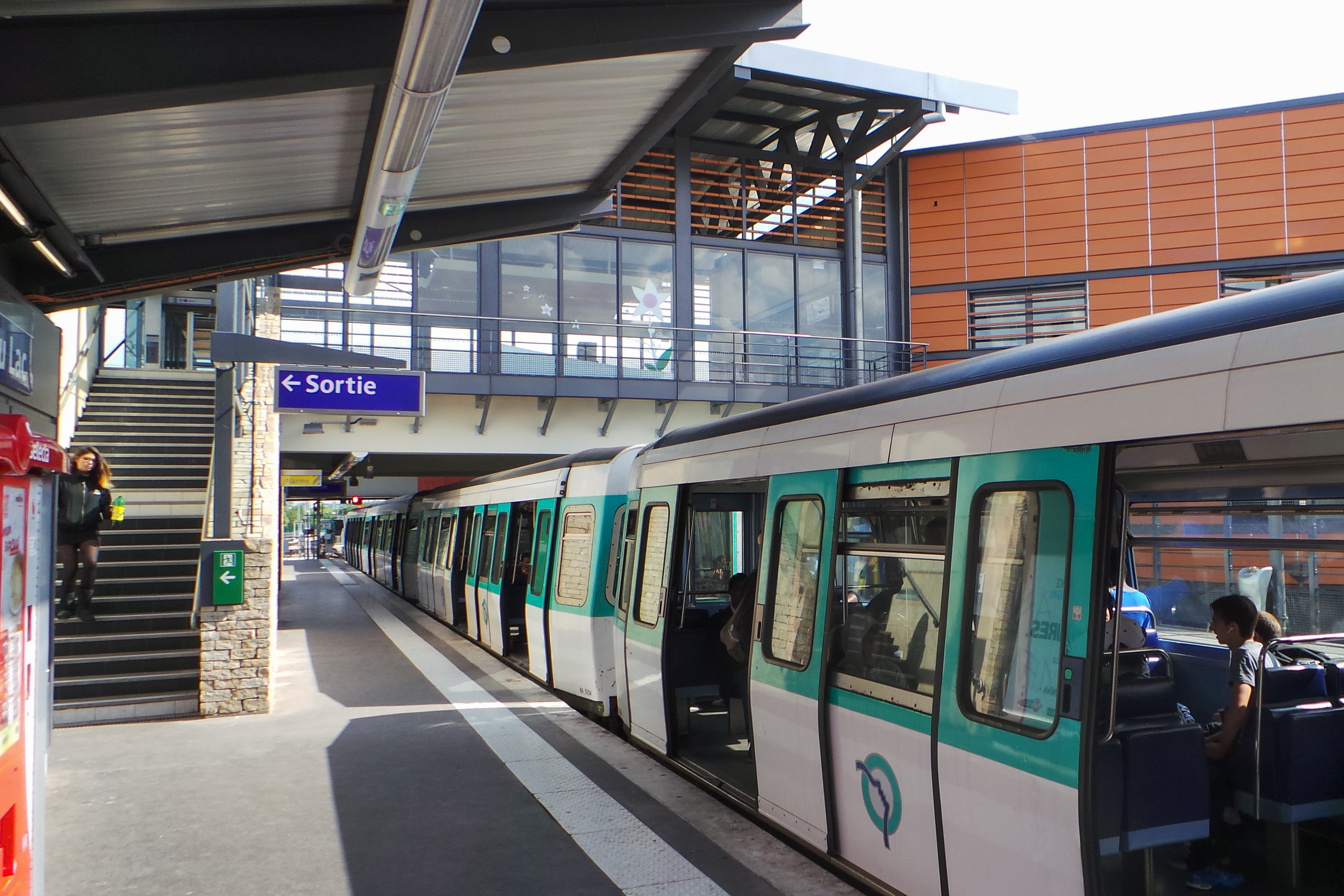
- MF 77 train waiting at Pointe du Lac, the line's southeastern terminus in Créteil

Overview
- Locale: Paris, Charenton-le-Pont, Maisons-Alfort, Créteil
- Termini: Balard; Pointe du Lac
- Connecting lines: Paris Metro Paris Metro Line 1 Paris Metro Line 3 Paris Metro Line 4 Paris Metro Line 5 Paris Metro Line 6 Paris Metro Line 7 Paris Metro Line 9 Paris Metro Line 10 Paris Metro Line 11 Paris Metro Line 12 Paris Metro Line 13 Paris Metro Line 14 RER RER A RER C RER E Tramways in Île-de-France Île-de-France tramway Line 2 Île-de-France tramway Line 3a Île-de-France cable car Câble 1
- Stations: 38

Service
- System: Paris Métro
- Operator: RATP
- Rolling stock: MF 77 (62 trains as of 14 November 2026)
- Ridership: 106 million (avg. per year); 7th/16 (2025)

History
- Opened: 13 July 1913; 113 years ago

Technical
- Line length: 23.4 km (14.5 mi)
- Track gauge: 1,435 mm (4 ft 8 1/2 in) standard gauge
- Electrification: 750 V DC third rail
- Conduction system: Conductor
- Average inter-station distance: 614 m (2,014 ft)

Paris Metro Line 8 (French: Ligne 8 du métro de Paris) is one of the sixteen lines of the Paris Métro currently opened. It connects Balard (Porte de Sèvres) in the southwestern part of Paris to Pointe du Lac station in the southeastern suburban city of Créteil, prefecture of the Val-de-Marne department, following a parabolic route across Paris. Last line proposed by Fulgence Bienvenüe's original 1898 Paris Métro project, line 8 opened in July 1913 and was initially intended to link Porte d'Auteuil and Opéra. With 105.5 million passengers in 2017, it is the network's eighth busiest line, as well as the current third longest (after Lines 13 and 14, even though Line 13 has a fork, and Line 15 is set to become the longest once fully opened), at 23.4 km (14.5 mi) in length. Alongside Line 7, it serves 38 distinct stations, the most of any line on the network, Grand Paris Express (lines 15 to 18) included. Line 8 interchanges with all other Métro lines but three : Lines 2, 3bis and 7bis.

The line was substantially modified during the 1930s as Line 10 took over the western section from La Motte - Picquet to Porte d'Auteuil. The current route serves the southwestern part of the French Capital, including the Champ de Mars, the Invalides, the Concorde Place, the Opéra Garnier, the Grands Boulevards, The places of République and Bastille as well as the Bois de Vincennes, before ending in the southeastern inner suburbs through the communes of Charenton-le-Pont, Maisons-Alfort and Créteil, which the line reached in 1974 at Créteil–Préfecture station, after several extensions. Line 8 was the first to connect the prefecture of one of the new departments of Île-de-France, more than a decade before Line 5 to Bobigny, and Line 15 to Nanterre in the near-future. Line 8 is also the only Paris underground line to cross the Seine and its principal tributary, the Marne river, above ground via a bridge between Charenton – Écoles and École Vétérinaire de Maisons-Alfort, it also crosses the Seine underground between Concorde and Invalides.

== History ==
=== Timeline ===
- 13 July 1913: Line 8 opened between Beaugrenelle (now Charles Michels) and Opéra.
- 30 September 1913: Line extended from Beaugrenelle to Porte d'Auteuil.
- 30 June 1928: Northern extension from Opéra to Richelieu-Drouot
- 5 May 1931: Line extended from Richelieu-Drouot to Porte de Charenton in one move.
- 27 July 1937: Section between La Motte-Picquet and Porte d'Auteuil transferred to Line 10 ; Line 8 extended from La Motte-Picquet to Balard.
- 2 September 1939: Like many other stations, service to Saint-Martin and Champ de Mars was halted because of World War II; both stations never reopened.
- 5 October 1942: Line extended eastbound from Porte de Charenton to Charenton – Écoles.
- 19 September 1970: Line extended from Charenton – Écoles to Maisons-Alfort – Stade.
- 27 April 1972: Line extended from Maisons-Alfort – Stade to Maisons-Alfort – Les Juillottes.
- 24 September 1973: Line extended from Maisons-Alfort – Les Julliottes to Créteil–L'Echat.
- 9 September 1974: Line extended from Créteil–L'Echat to Créteil–Préfecture.
- June 1980: Rolling stock cascades to the MF 77 train, last Sprague-Thomson train is removed.
- 8 October 2011: Line extended from Créteil–Préfecture to Pointe du Lac.
- 2023: Refurbishment begins on the line's MF 77 trains, after lines 13 and 7.
- 2029: Arrival of the MF 19 rolling stock on line 8, after lines 10, 7bis, 3bis, 13 and 12, but before lines 3 and 7.

=== Birth of the line ===
Line 8 was the last line created by the concession of 30 March 1898, and the déclaration d'utilité publique was approved on 6 April 1903. The project would connect Opéra with Porte d'Auteuil via Grenelle with a shuttle, similar to the network's other lines. In accordance with the plan to operate Line 7 with a junction on the outskirts of Paris, a branch towards the Porte de Sèvres (today Balard) starting from the Grenelle station was planned to be built subsequently. The trains would alternately run on the two branches, like for lines 3, 7 and now 13.

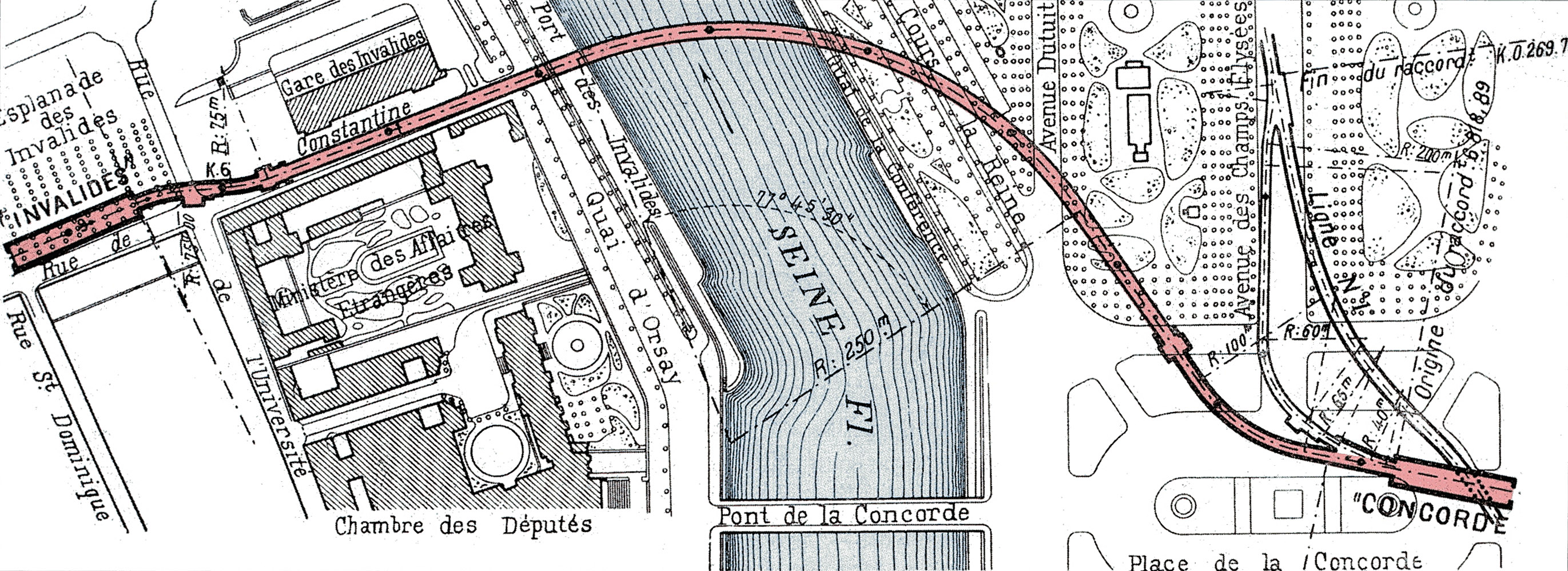
Plan of the underwater crossing, downstream from Pont de la Concorde

Construction of the underwater crossing of the Seine began in April 1908 between the Concorde and Invalides stations, at the level of Pont Mirabeau. It was finished in January 1911, after a lengthy delay caused by the 1910 flood. The crossing was routed with a curve 250 metres away.

Although metal caissons were originally planned to be sunk vertically (as had been done on Line 4), a tunnel was drilled following a single circular tube with the aid of a shield; authorities opposed the first method because of the risks to boating. However, the crossing near Pont Mirabeau was made with vertical caissons. The Invalides-Javel section was completed in 1910. The Grenelle station was planned as a double station with platforms on two levels, with the aim to later send trains on the two branches. However, only one station with a central platform was built, as the Balard branch was delayed.

Before the completion of work near Pont Mirabeau, the line opened to the public on 13 July 1913 between Beaugrenelle and Opéra; the extension to Porte d'Auteuil followed on 30 September. The Invalides and Concorde stations were still unfinished and opened on 24 December 1913 and 12 March 1914, respectively. In 1914, the line had fifteen stations between Porte d'Auteuil and Opéra.

=== First extensions ===
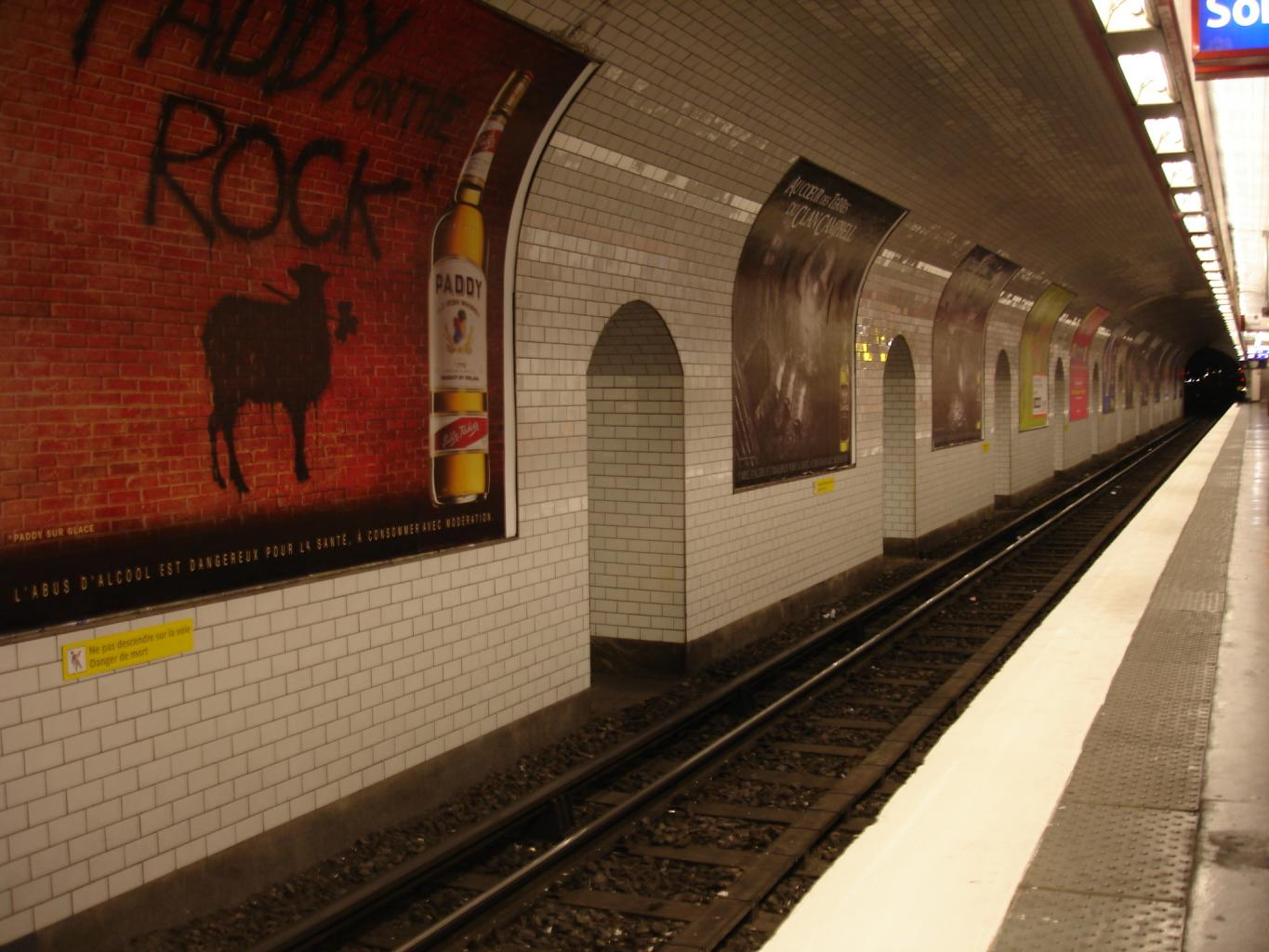
Central abutment of the Grands Boulevards station

Extension of the line began on 29 December 1922, intending to transform Line 8 into a parabolic axis connecting Auteuil to Porte de Charenton via Opéra, Place de la République, Place de la Bastille, Avenue Daumesnil in the 12th arrondissement and Porte de Picpus. As part of the extension, a common route with Line 9 between the Richelieu – Drouot and République stations was planned in order to limit the impact of this problematic section on street traffic. Located on the former course of the Seine, the ground is soft and the initial plan to build two parallel tunnels generated lengthy controversy.

The first new section opened on 30 June 1928, extending the line by 643 metres (2,110 ft) to Richelieu – Drouot from Opéra. With an increase in traffic forecast, at its 21 March 1926 meeting the Municipal Council of Paris decided to increase the new Line 7, 8 and 9 station length from 75 metres (246 ft) to 105 metres (344 ft) to use stock seven-car trains. Although lengthening the old stations was planned later, the work was never completed. The new Richelieu – Drouot station was the system's first 105-metre (344 ft) station, but train length was limited by the shorter stations.

The 1931 Paris Colonial Exposition in Bois de Vincennes necessitated the extension of Line 8 to Porte Dorée for its opening. The extension of the line to Porte de Charenton, including the construction of seventeen 105-metre stations, was agreed on 25 March 1924 and work began in 1928. The configuration of Lines 8 and 9, under the Grands Boulevards' wet and unstable ground, drove the decision to extend the line on two levels. The Line 8 stations are on the upper level: two half-stations, separated by a central supporting wall to ensure stability. The 7.8 km (4.8 mi) extension was completed in March 1931 and opened to the public on 5 May, ending at Porte de Charenton. The line now included thirty-three stations between Porte d'Auteuil and Porte de Charenton.

=== Major restructuring ===
1937 restructuring of Line 8, Line 10 and Line 14

The line's southwestern portion was modified in 1937, with the system's circular lines replaced by axes crossing the city. Instead of connecting the Bois de Boulogne and the Bois de Vincennes as previously expected, Line 8 was now meant to connect Balard and Porte de Charenton, using the delayed portion of the line initially expected as a branch. The changes affected several lines; Line 8 had a new terminus at Balard, and the old section the line between La Motte-Picquet and Porte d'Auteuil was reassigned to Line 10 initially ending at Invalides as part of the subway rocade project now cancelled.

The La Motte-Picquet - Grenelle station was modified so that Line 8 trains departed only for Balard, instead of alternating between Auteuil and Balard as originally expected:

- The original underground station, connected to Champ de Mars on both tracks, was modified so its western platform (initially welcoming Line 8 trains heading south to Auteuil) would instead welcome Line 10's trains headed south to Auteuil.
- Its central platform, initially welcoming Line 8's trains coming back from Auteuil, now welcomes line 10's trains headed back from Auteuil.
- The eastern platform would receive Line 8 trains heading North as usual, except that these now come from Balard instead of Auteuil.
- A new station was built right below the western platform, in order to accommodate the Line 8 trains now headed south to Balard.

The section between Duroc and Invalides was transferred to the old Line 14, which eventually merged with Line 13 in 1976 to become the actual Line 13.

The section between La Motte-Picquet and Balard opened on 27 July 1937, at the same time as the Javel maintenance workshop. At that time, the line included thirty-one stations between Balard and Porte de Charenton.

=== Second wave of extensions toward Créteil ===
The extension to Charenton-le-Pont was approved on 24 December 1929. Work began in 1936, and a 1,410-metre (4,630 ft) opened on 5 October 1942. Two new stations were created: Liberté and Charenton – Écoles in Charenton-le-Pont. Although in 1942 the line had thirty-three stations, Champ de Mars and Saint-Martin were closed on 2 September 1939.

After the war, the only metro extension was Line 13 (to Carrefour Pleyel) in 1952. Investment programmes in 1965 and 1967 envisaged three extensions. One was Line 8 to Maisons-Alfort, due to overcrowding at Charenton-le-Pont which disrupted bus service to Charenton. The extension required crossing the Marne on a viaduct, since the Charenton – Écoles station was at the edge of a cliff north of the river.

A concrete, 199-metre (653 ft) viaduct was built in spring 1968. Aesthetically designed to integrate with the landscape, it has six supports (including one of its three piers in the river. The two central spans are 55.5 metres (182 ft) long, and the two side spans 30 metres (98 ft) long. The structural steel is a continuous metal beam, supported by two vertical beams. These beams frame the bottom of the trains, and the rails are laid on track ballast, for noise reduction. On the north, the viaduct overhangs the A4 autoroute before going underground on a 100-metre (330 ft) access ramp. On the south, the line immediately goes underground on a 70-metre (230 ft) ramp. The viaduct has a continuous slope of 40 mm/m, enabling it to go underground when it crosses the left bank of the Marne. In June 1969 the metal beams were put in place, and the structure was completed in November.

This viaduct, the first built since the Line 6 viaduct in 1909, leads to a three-track tunnel to the terminus. The section from Charenton – Écoles to Maisons-Alfort – Stade opened on 19 September 1970.

=== Extension to Créteil ===
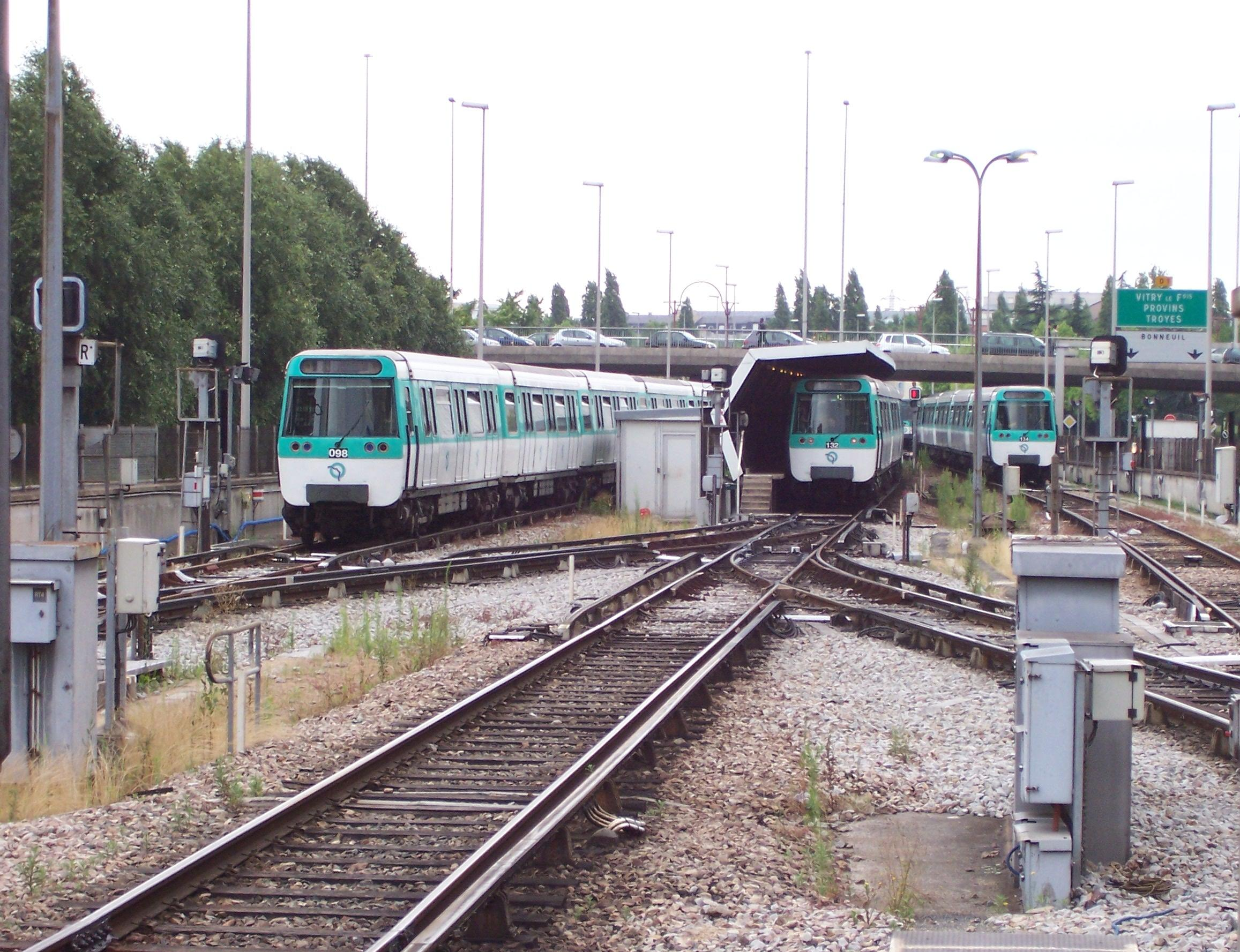
Open-air tracks at the Créteil–Préfecture depot

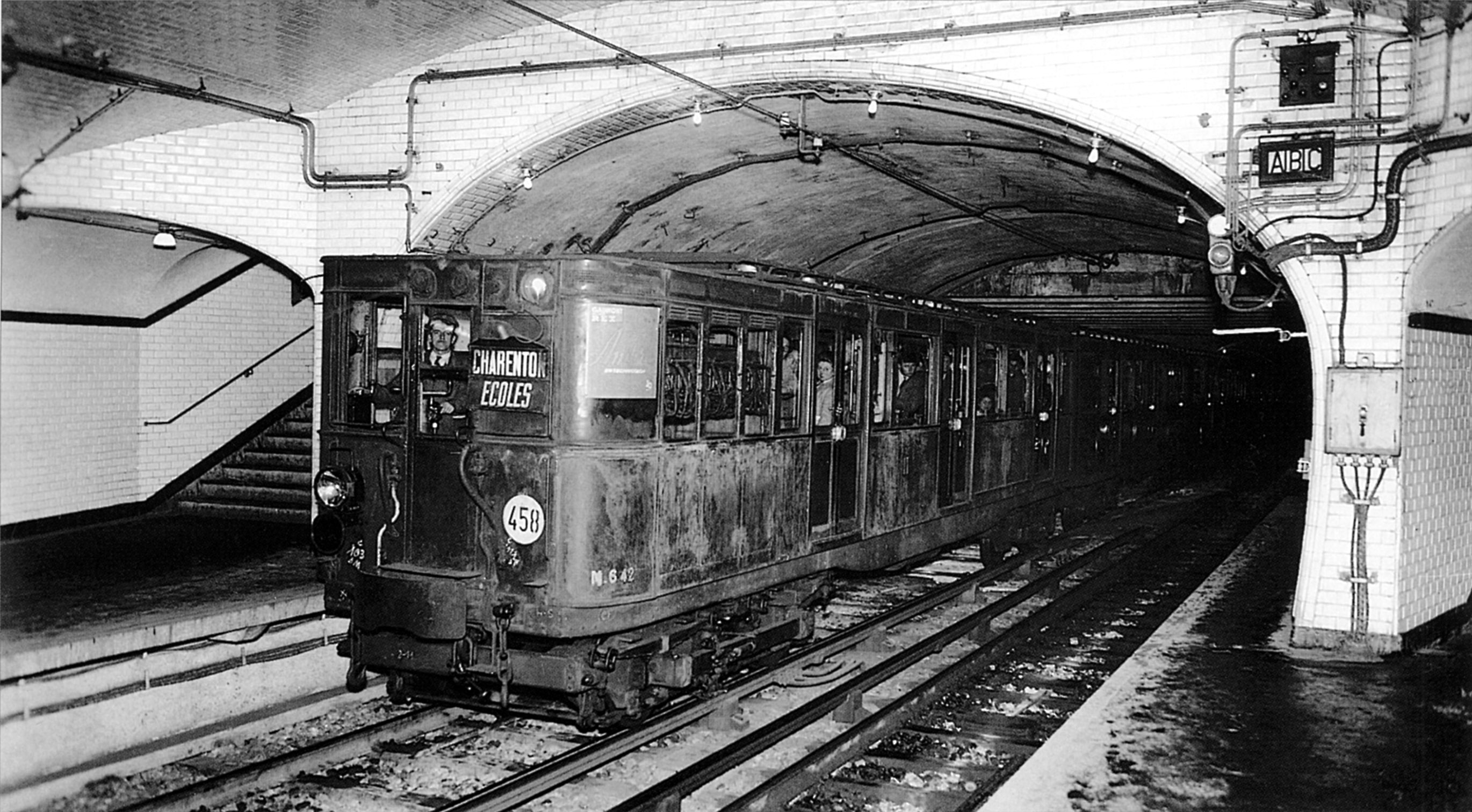
Train entering the new Charenton – Écoles station around 1943

Créteil became a prefecture after the creation of the department of Val-de-Marne, resulting in an increase in population, and a new extension was quickly begun in several stages. The line reached Maisons-Alfort – Les Juilliottes on 27 April 1972 in a tunnel. It enters Créteil on 2 km (1.2 mi), open-air tracks in the median of a highway. The Créteil–L'Échat station, with a central platform, opened on 24 September 1973; Créteil–Préfecture station, with three tracks and two platforms, opened on 10 September 1974. This was the first Paris Métro connection between the Capital and the prefecture of a bordering department, extending the line to over 22 km (14 mi) and 37 stations.

The extensions triggered a change from a single fare to fares by section on 19 September 1970, when the extension to Maisons-Alfort–Stade opened. Stations are equipped with an automatic check at the exit with a turnstile, and travellers paid a supplementary fare to exit. The system returned to a single fare on 1 November 1982.

The extension of line 8 south of Créteil-Préfecture, over 1.3 km (0.81 mi) to Pointe du Lac station was opened on 8 October 2011. It was approved by the launch of the preliminary project and the financing agreement by the STIF council, the transport organising authority in Île-de-France, during its meeting of 20 September 2006. Preparatory work began on 5 March 2007. This extension requires a crossing of the RD1 expressway, by means of a flyover. This structure, 80 m long and 8.20 m wide overhangs the line by 4.10 m and rests on 80 mm diameter piles anchored at a depth of 18 m. The total expected cost of the structure was €83 million.

This extension was aiming to connect the Pointe du Lac district, the US Créteil-Lusitanos football stadium and the Europarc business district, to the already near metro network. This project was accompanied by the deviation of an already existing bus line, RATP bus line 393, connecting the new Créteil-Pompadour station on RER line D (opened on 15 December 2013) and Sucy–Bonneuil station on RER line A. A new additional maintenance workshop is also being put into service with this new extension.

== Route and stations ==
Geographically accurate map of Line 8

=== Route ===
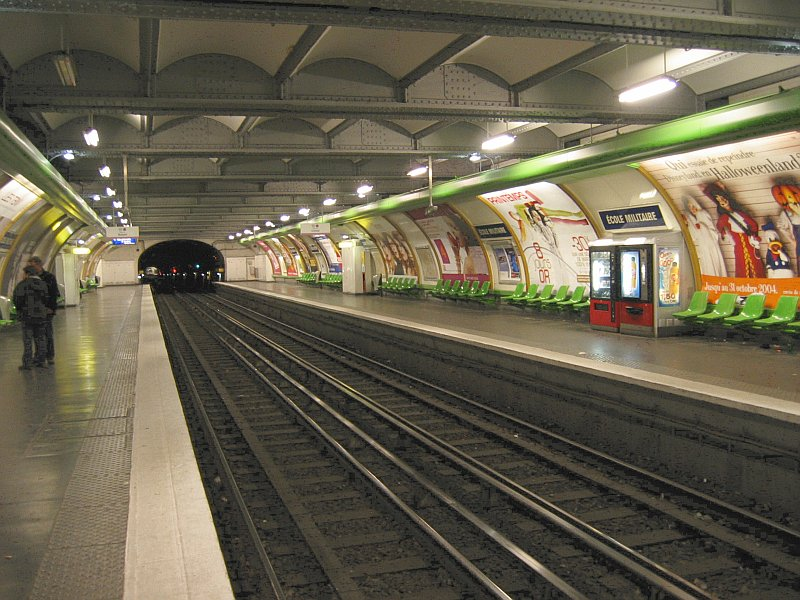
The École Militaire station before its renovation, which began in 2008

Line 8 is 22.057 km (13.706 mi) long, including 2.8 km (1.7 mi) of open-air tracks in the southeastern suburbs. It is the second-longest line (after Line 13), with the greatest distance between its terminals.

The line begins in 15th arrondissement of Paris at the level of the Porte de Sèvres. The rear station at Balard is under the Paris heliport, beyond the Boulevard Périphérique viaduct. The station has three tracks and a central platform, with the end of the line supplemented by four parking tracks.

It then runs toward Hôtel des Invalides along Avenue Félix-Faure, passing under the Chemin de fer de Petite Ceintureviaduct and arriving at the Lourmel station (three tracks with platforms, one of which runs to the Javel maintenance workshop. It then serves the Boucicaut and Félix Faure stations.

After these stations, Line 8 follows the Rue du Commerce. Because of the narrowness of the street, the Commerce station has staggered platforms. At the intersection of Rue du Commerce and Avenue Emile-Zola, the Line 8 tunnel is under Line 10 in a common structure. As the line reaches the La Motte-Picquet–Grenelle station, the eastbound Lines 8 (toward Créteil–Préfecture) and 10 (toward Gare d'Austerlitz) use the same central platform; the westbound Line 8 (toward Balard) is under the westbound Line 10 for historical reasons.

The line then follows Avenue de la Motte-Picquet at a .04-percent grade, bringing it near the surface. The Champ de Mars station, between La Motte-Picquet – Grenelle and École Militaire, was closed on 2 September 1939. A rush-hour track, unusual in the system, and a connection are between the La Motte-Picquet–Grenelle and Champ de Mars stations.

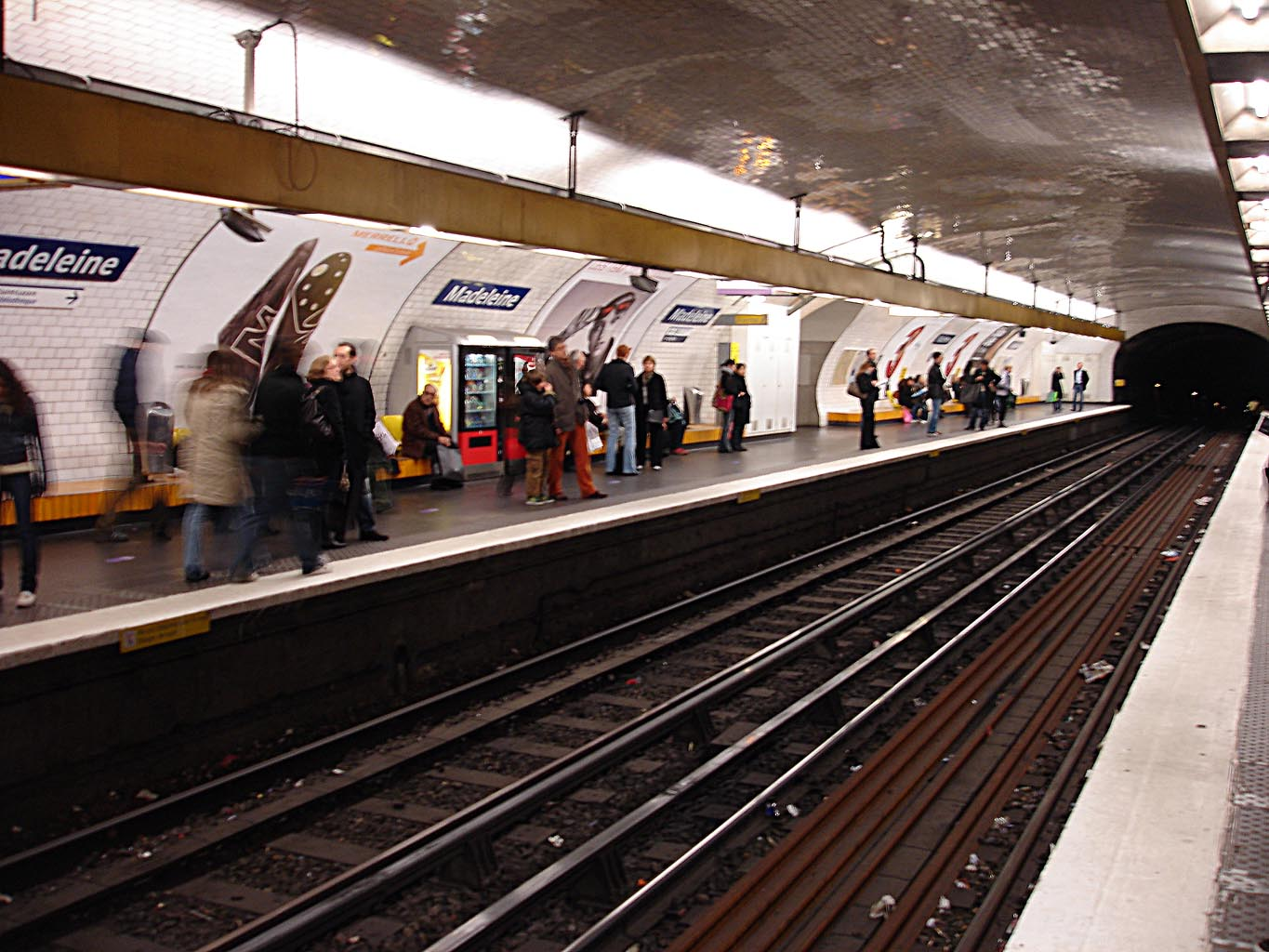
The Madeleine station

After the Champ de Mars ghost station the line serves École Militaire and La Tour-Maubourg, curving right and left under the Invalides esplanade and beginning a .04-percent descent under the park tracks and the main tracks of Line 13 to the Invalides station under the Rue de Constantine. At Rue Robert-Esnault-Pelterie, it begins a second .04-percent descent under RER Line C to cross the Seine through a metal tunnel. The line then goes up the Right Bank on a curved, .035-percent grade to the Concorde station.

Line 8 then runs under Rue Royale, under the Asnières sewage-treatment plant and then above Line 12, to reach Madeleine. It crosses Line 14, passing the Clichy sewage-treatment plant to Opera before skirting the Grands Boulevards to Richelieu – Drouot. At this station Lines 8 and 9 begin a common infrastructure, with Line 8 above Line 9.

Both lines reach the same level at République, via Grands Boulevards, Bonne Nouvelle, Strasbourg – Saint-Denis and the closed Saint Martin station. On the east side of République the tunnel widens to three and then four tracks, used by both lines for connections on the west side of the station.

The line continues under the Grands Boulevards to Bastille, via Filles du Calvaire, Saint-Sébastien – Froissart and Chemin Vert. Before arriving at Bastille, it descends under Line 5 and Canal Saint-Martin at a .40-percent grade. The line then follows the Rue du Fauborg-Saint-Antoine to the Ledru-Rollin and Faidherbe – Chaligny stations, curving to follow the Rue de Reuilly to the Reuilly – Diderot station.

Line 8 reaches Montgallet on a .04-percent grade before the Bois de Vincennes, via the Daumesnil, Michel Bizot and Porte Dorée stations. It then turns southwest to the Porte of Charenton station. The line then turns southeast, leaving Paris to cross the commune of Charenton-le-Pont via the Liberté and Charenton – Écoles stations. This station has two tracks with platforms and two sidings, since it was a longtime terminus.

The line continues in open air for 353 metres (1,158 ft) before crossing the A4 autoroute and the Marne. The viaduct is two metal, 199-metre (653 ft) structures, with a slope of .04014 percent. Line 8 goes underground again through Maisons-Alfort along Avenue Général-Leclerc, via the École Vétérinaire de Maisons-Alfort, Maisons-Alfort – Stade and Maisons-Alfort – Les Juilliottes stations. The latter, a former terminus, has three tracks with a platform and a depot.

Line 8 then has three tracks to its terminus. Before arriving at Créteil–L'Échat, it crosses the Route nationale 19-A86 autoroute interchange and continues in open air. The tracks, along CD 1, serve the Créteil–Université and Créteil–Préfecture stations.

Line 8 continues south past the intersection of CD 1 and CD 60 to Pointe du Lacand behind the Stade Dominique Duvauchelle at Créteil, where a new maintenance shop has been built.

=== List of stations ===
Line 8 has 38 opened stations, including 13 which connect to 12 other Métro and two RER lines.

List of stations

Station	Arrondissement or commune	Connections	Notes
Balard	15th	Tramways in Île-de-France Île-de-France tramway Line 2 Île-de-France tramway Line 3a	Named after French chemist Antoine Jérôme Balard
Lourmel	15th		
Boucicaut	15th		
Félix Faure	15th		Named after Félix Faure, seventh President of the French Republic
Commerce	15th		
La Motte-Picquet–Grenelle	15th	Paris Metro Paris Metro Line 6 Paris Metro Line 10	Named after French admiral Toussaint-Guillaume Picquet de la Motte and the neighbourhood of Grenelle
École Militaire	7th		Near École Militaire
La Tour-Maubourg	7th		
Invalides	7th	Paris Metro Paris Metro Line 13 RER RER C	Near Les Invalides
Concorde	1st, 8th	Paris Metro Paris Metro Line 1 Paris Metro Line 12	Near the Place de la Concorde
Madeleine	8th	Paris Metro Paris Metro Line 12 Paris Metro Line 14	Near the Église de la Madeleine
Opéra	2nd, 9th	Paris Metro Paris Metro Line 3 Paris Metro Line 7 RER RER A RER E	Located near the Opéra Garnier
Richelieu–Drouot	2nd, 9th	Paris Metro Paris Metro Line 9	Named after Louis XIII's first minister Cardinal Richelieu and Napoleon's general, Antoine Drouot
Grands Boulevards	2nd, 9th	Paris Metro Paris Metro Line 9	Originally named Rue Montmartre, it was renamed to avoid existing confusion with the Montmartre district.
Bonne Nouvelle	2nd, 9th, 10th	Paris Metro Paris Metro Line 9	Named after nearby church Notre-Dame de Bonne-Nouvelle (Our Lady of the Good News)
Strasbourg–Saint-Denis	2nd, 3rd, 10th	Paris Metro Paris Metro Line 4 Paris Metro Line 9	Named after the capital city of Alsace and the first bishop of Paris, Saint Denis, who gave its name to the eponymous city.
République	3rd, 10th, 11th	Paris Metro Paris Metro Line 3 Paris Metro Line 5 Paris Metro Line 9 Paris Metro Line 11	Located under Place de la République
Filles du Calvaire	3rd, 11th		"Daughters of Calvary", named after the old convent of this order
Saint-Sébastien–Froissart	3rd, 11th		Named after the streets referring to Saint Sebastian and 14th-century poet and writer Jean Froissart
Chemin Vert	3rd, 11th		
Bastille	4th, 11th, 12th	Paris Metro Paris Metro Line 1 Paris Metro Line 5	Under the Place de la Bastille, on which the former Bastille fortress was erected.
Ledru-Rollin	4th, 11th, 12th		Named after the avenue of 19th century lawyer Alexandre Auguste Ledru-Rollin
Faidherbe–Chaligny	11th, 12th		Streets named after 19th-century General Louis Faidherbe and the Chaligny family of metalworkers
Reuilly–Diderot	12th	Paris Metro Paris Metro Line 1	Named after 18th-century philosopher Denis Diderot
Montgallet	12th		
Daumesnil	12th	Paris Metro Paris Metro Line 6	Named after general Pierre Yrieix Daumesnil
Michel Bizot	12th		
Porte Dorée	12th	Tramways in Île-de-France Île-de-France tramway Line 3a	
Porte de Charenton	12th	Tramways in Île-de-France Île-de-France tramway Line 3a	
Liberté	Charenton-le-Pont		
Charenton–Écoles	Charenton-le-Pont		
École Vétérinaire de Maisons-Alfort	Maisons-Alfort		Named after the Veterinary School located above
Maisons-Alfort–Stade	Maisons-Alfort		
Maisons-Alfort–Les Juilliottes	Maisons-Alfort		
Créteil–L'Échat	Créteil		
Créteil–Université	Créteil		
Créteil–Préfecture	Créteil		
Pointe du Lac	Créteil	Île-de-France cable car Câble 1	

=== Renamed stations ===
Five stations on the line have been renamed:

Date	Old name	New name	Notes
15 May 1921	Wilhelm	Eglise d'Auteuil	now on line 10
12 January 1932	Saint-Sébastien	Saint-Sébastien – Froissart	
1996	Maisons-Alfort – Ecole Vétérinaire	Ecole Vétérinaire de Maisons-Alfort	
September 1998	Rue Montmartre	Grands Boulevards	Renamed to prevent confusion with the Montmartre district

=== Themed and unique stations ===
La Motte-Picquet – Grenelle's connecting passageways are decorated with coats of arms of the Toussaint-Guillaume Picquet de la Motte family. A fresco depicting the toll barrier of the Cunette, one of the entrances of the Wall of the Farmers, was previously located here.

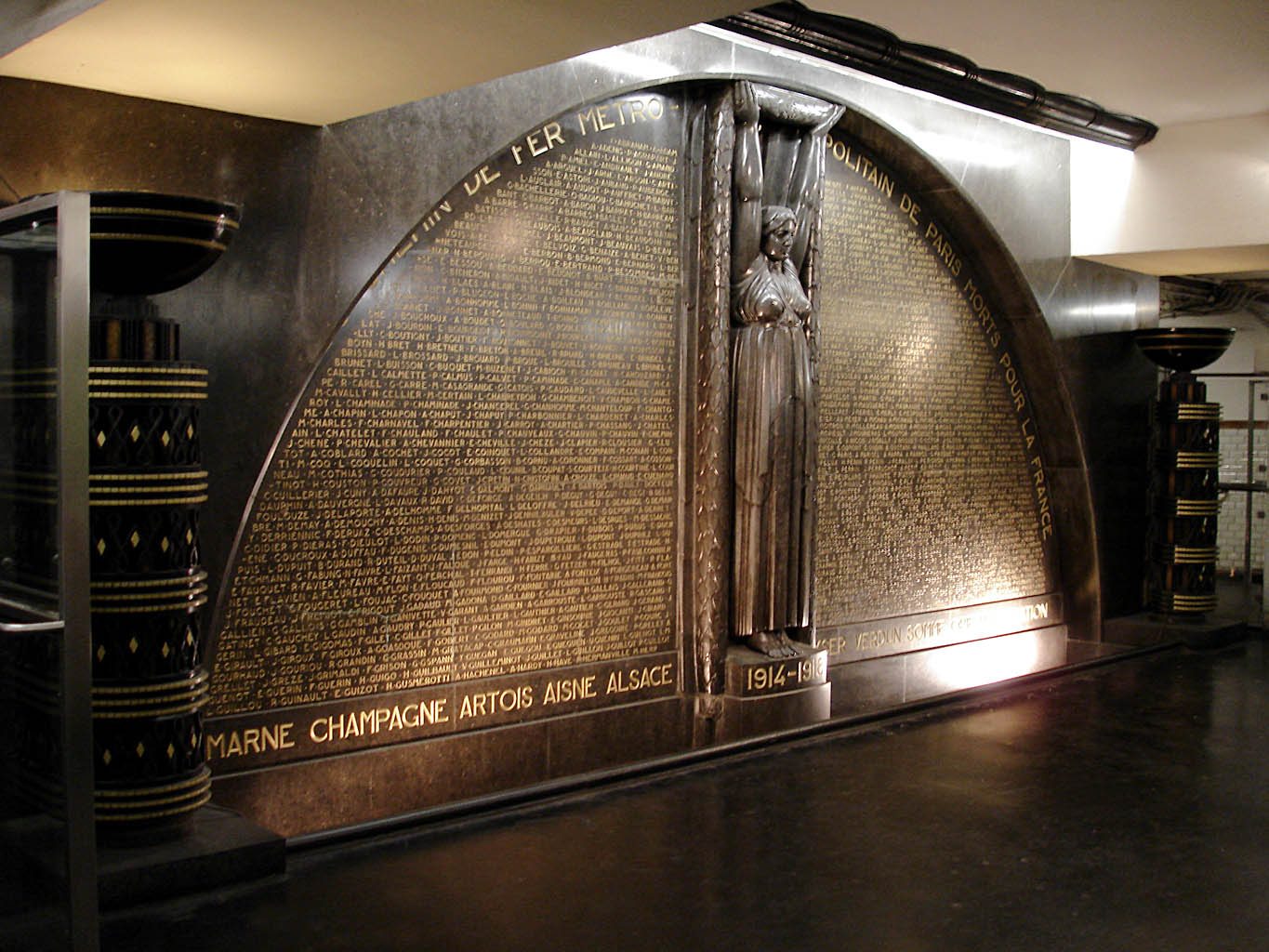
War memorial at Richelieu – Drouot

Richelieu–Drouot has a black marble war memorial dedicated to metropolitan railway employees "morts pour la France" (Dead for France), sculpted by Carlo Sarrabezolles in 1931. The central pillar is a caryatid, who supports the surrounding stone with her raised arms. The caryatid divides the names of subway employees killed during World War I into two half-circles. The monument's base contains the names of the Great War battlefields, and the word "Release" was added to the bottom right after World War II to commemorate employee participation in the French Resistance.

Bonne Nouvelle was redecorated in a cinematic theme for the Métro's centennial. The station's name is written in the style of the Hollywood Sign in Los Angeles.

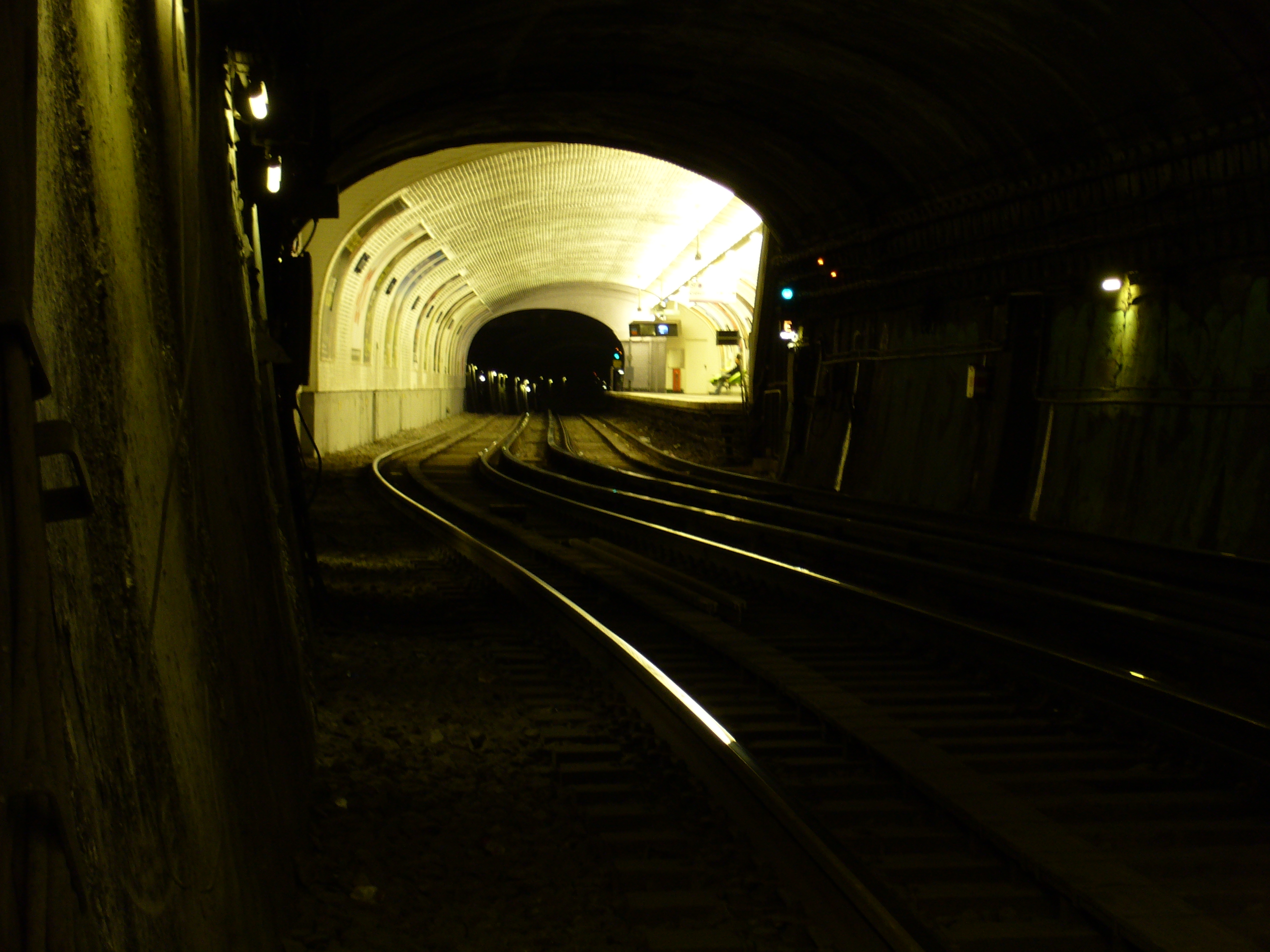
Repositioned platforms at the Commerce station

Some stations still show signs of difficulty in construction or integration into urban space:

- Commerce has offset platforms because of the narrowness of the above Rue du Commerce.
- The platforms at La Motte-Picquet–Grenelle do not face each other because of the original role of the station, serving the d'Auteuil and Balard branches. The platform to Balard is below and shifted slightly with respect to the Créteil platform.
- Champ de Mars and Saint-Martin were closed on 2 September 1939 and not reopened since.
- République is a part-time terminus.
- Porte de Charenton, an old terminus, has four tracks with platforms: two sidings framed by the two main tracks.
- Charenton–Écoles, another old terminus, includes two tracks with a platform and two sidings.
- Maisons-Alfort–Les Juilliottes, like the two preceding stations, has three tracks with a platform; the middle one is a part-time terminus.
- Créteil–L'Échat and Créteil–Université are two-track stations framing a central platform.

=== Rail transfers ===
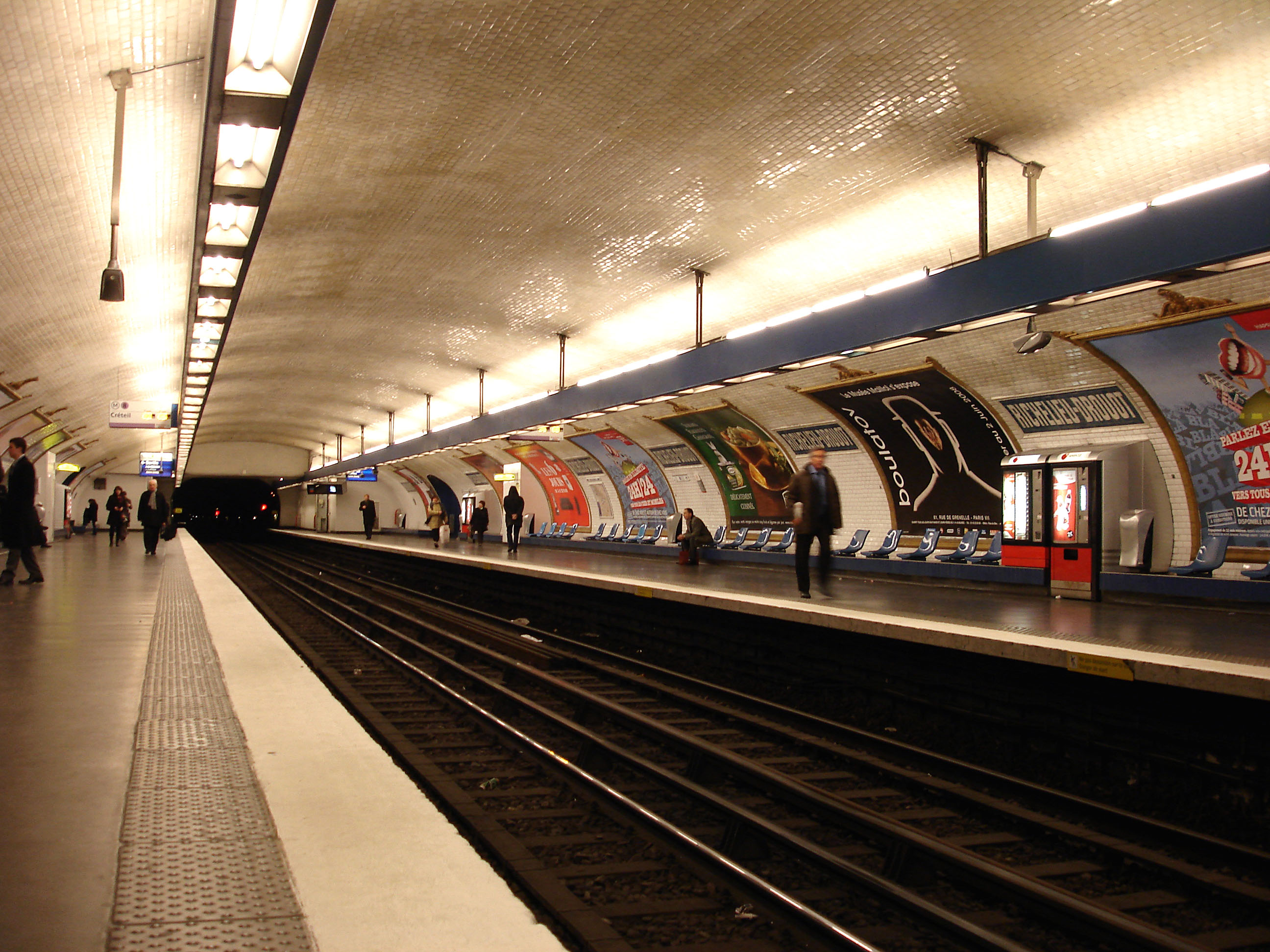
Richelieu – Drouot, eastbound terminus from 1928 to 1931

The lines has eight rail connections with other lines of the network system:

- Line 10 between École Militaire and La Motte-Picquet – Grenelle toward Balard, facing the exit of the closed Champ de Mars station, using the original Line 8 rails allowing trains to head for Auteuil
- Line 13 – Two connections in the Invalides complex: one (made into a reception area for new RATP recruits) between Invalides and Concorde toward Créteil – Préfecture, and the other facing the La Tour-Maubourg entrance toward Balard
- Line 1, a sharp right turn after exiting Concorde toward Balard, connecting to the opposing direction track from Champs-Élysées to Concorde towards Vincennes
- Line 5 between République and Strasbourg – Saint-Denis, at the exit of Saint-Martin station towards Créteil, connecting right before République towards Place d'Italie
- Line 9 – Two connections between Strasbourg – Saint-Denis and République (both tracks)
- Line 6 between Daumesnil and Montgallet toward Balard, trailing. Connects to Line 6 between Bel-Air and Daumesnil.

== Tourism ==
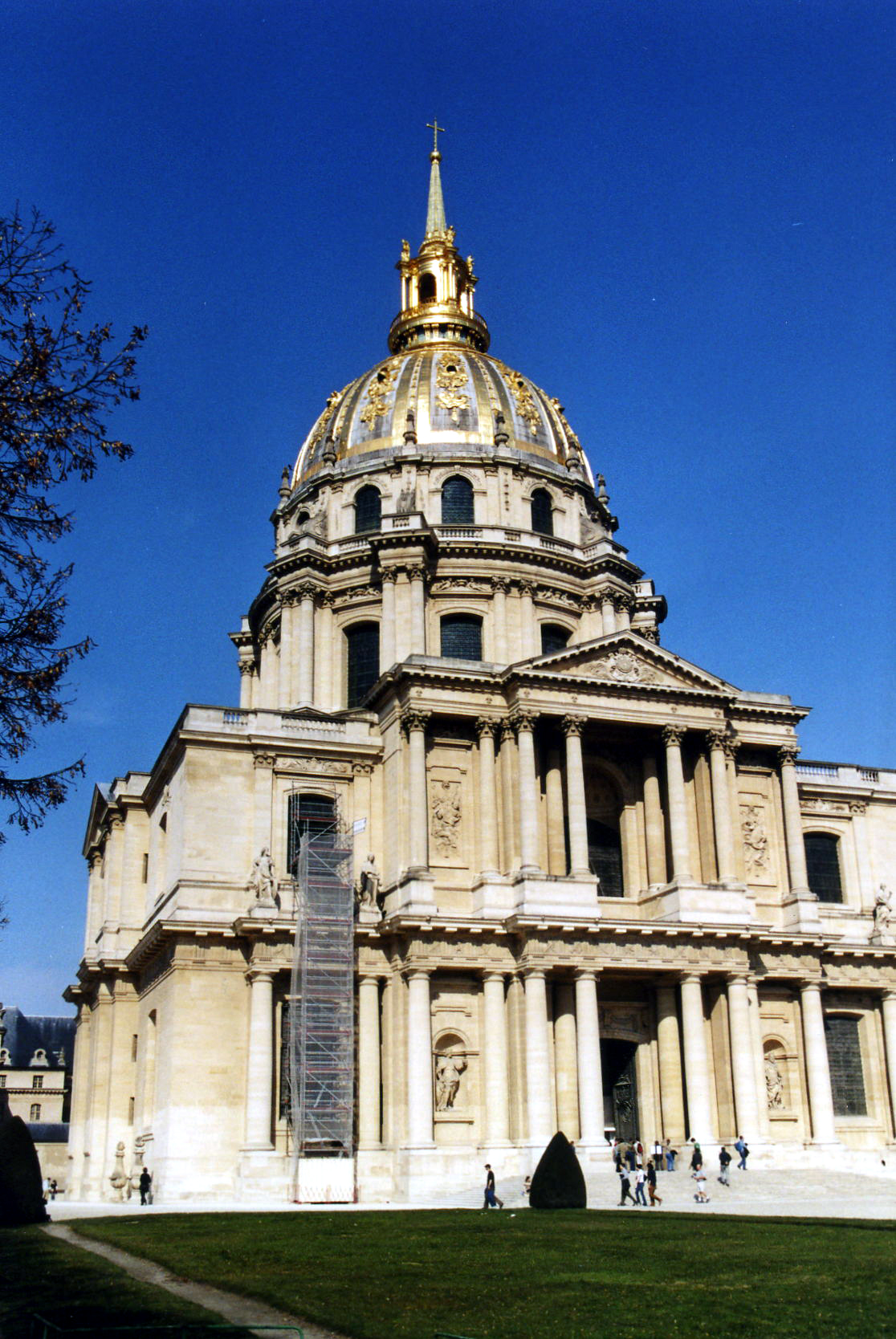
Les Invalides

Line 8 runs near several points of interest in Paris:

- The Aquaboulevard water park and Porte de Sèvres heliport (Balard)
- École militaire, the Champ de Mars and the Eiffel Tower (École Militaire)
- Invalides, including the tomb of Napoléon Bonaparte (Invalides)
- Place de la Concorde, including the Obelisk and the Tuileries gardens (Concorde)
- Church of the Madeleine (Madeleine)
- The Opera Garnier (Opéra)
- The Grands Boulevards (between Madeleine and République)
- Place de la République (République)
- The Cirque d'Hiver (Filles du Calvaire)
- The Bastille and its adjacent modern opera house, the Opéra Bastille (Bastille)
- Cité nationale de l'histoire de l'immigration and the Aquarium of the Palais de la Porte Dorée (Porte Dorée)
- The Bois de Vincennes, Foire du Trône and Paris Zoological Park (four stations between Porte Dorée and Charenton–Écoles)

Further east, the line passes points of interest in Val-de-Marne:

- The museum of the École nationale vétérinaire d'Alfort (École Vétérinaire de Maisons-Alfort)
- The museum of Maisons-Alfort (Maisons-Alfort–Les Juilliottes)
- Créteil Soleil Mall (Créteil–Préfecture)

== See also ==
- Paris
- Place de la Concorde
- Transport in Paris
- List of stations of the Paris Métro
- List of stations of the Paris RER
- List of metro systems
- Rail transport in France
