= Saint-Martin station (Paris Metro) =

Closed metro station in Paris, France

Coordinates: 48.8684°N 2.35866°E

Saint-Martin (French pronunciation: [sɛ̃ maʁtɛ̃]) is a ghost station of the Paris Métro, located on lines 8 and 9 between the stations of Strasbourg - Saint-Denis and République, on the border of the 3rd and 10th arrondissements of Paris.

== History ==
The station was closed on 2 September 1939 at the start of World War II. It reopened after the French Liberation with a lot of traffic passing through, but was eventually closed again as a result of its proximity to the neighboring station of Strasbourg - Saint-Denis, which lies only 100 metres away.

In the past, the station served to shelter homeless persons, and the eastern section of the location is currently used as a day shelter for the homeless (managed by the Salvation Army).

In 2008, the line 8 tracks were walled off from the platform.

In March 2010, the tracks of the station along line 9 hosted a publicity event for the Nissan Qashqai, with many vehicles being transported on the platforms of this ghost station, which was also redecorated for the occasion with a number of lighting effects.

== Current ==
The physical entrance to the Saint-Martin station is still available from the street. To view it, take the Metro to the Strasbourg-Saint-Denis station, exit the station, and head east on Boulevard Saint-Martin about three minutes, walking towards République. The entrance will be on the right-hand side of the street, in a sunken part of the sidewalk. The entrance is covered in graffiti.

== Gallery ==
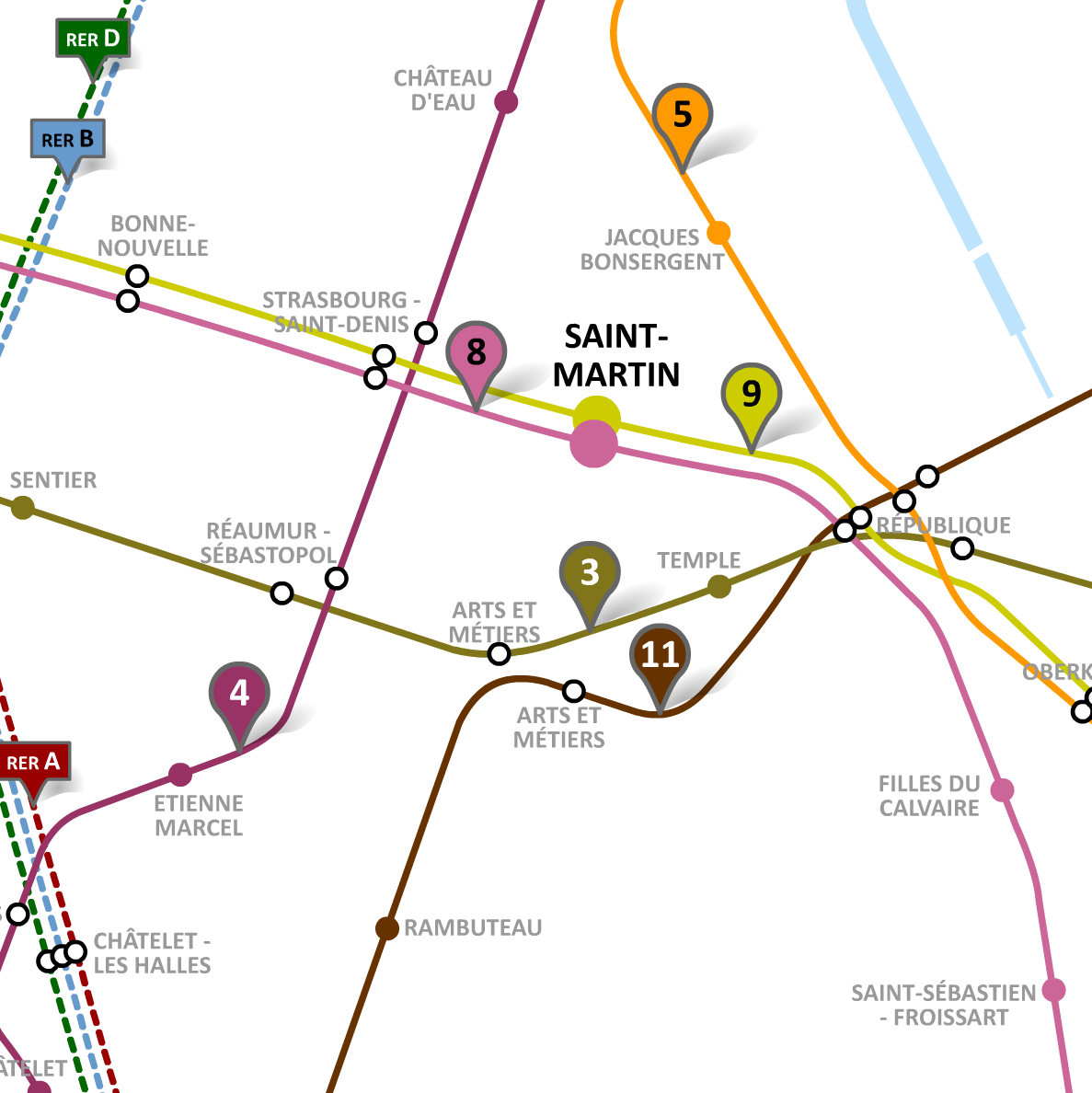
Location of the station.

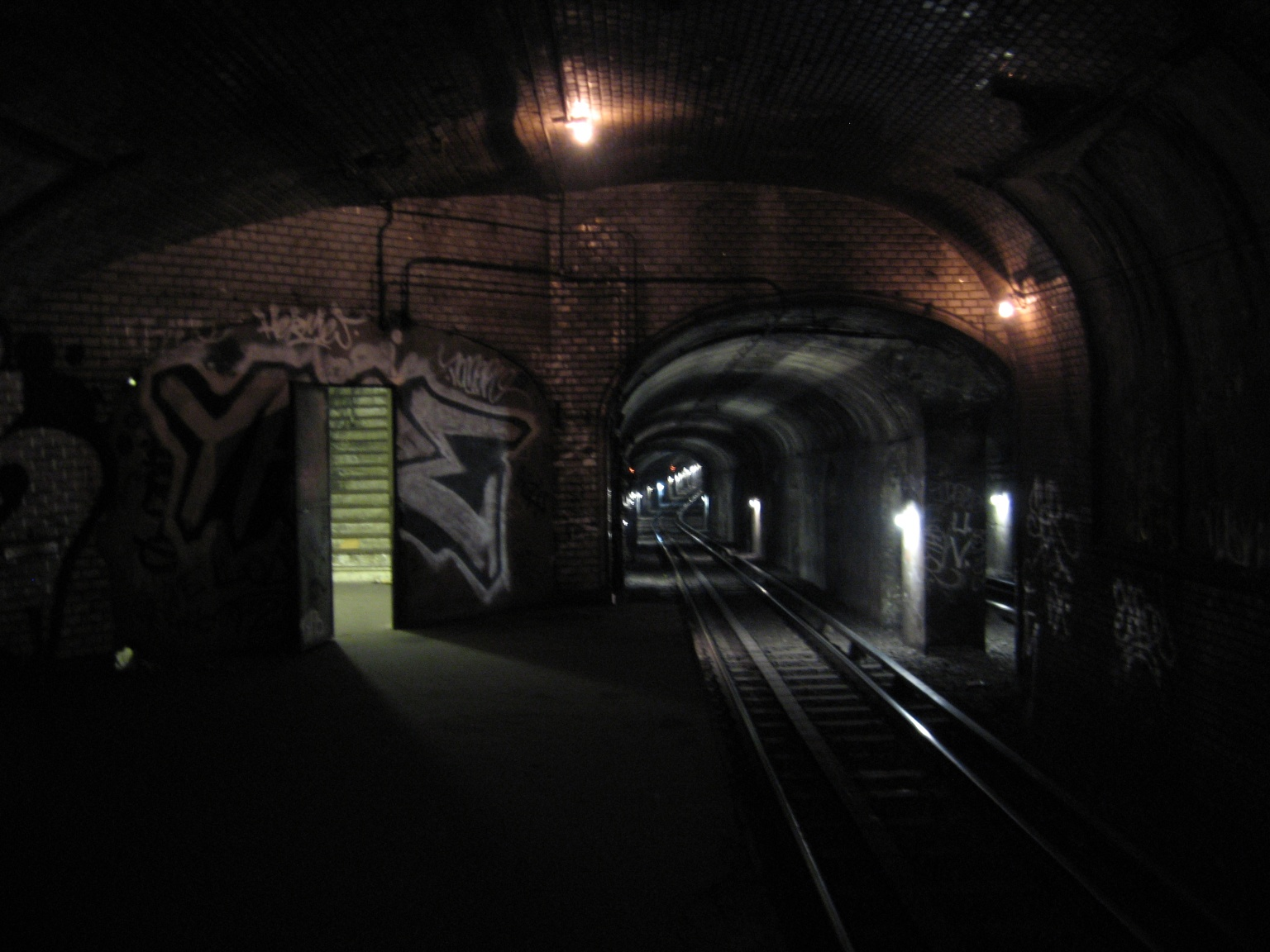
One of the tracks.

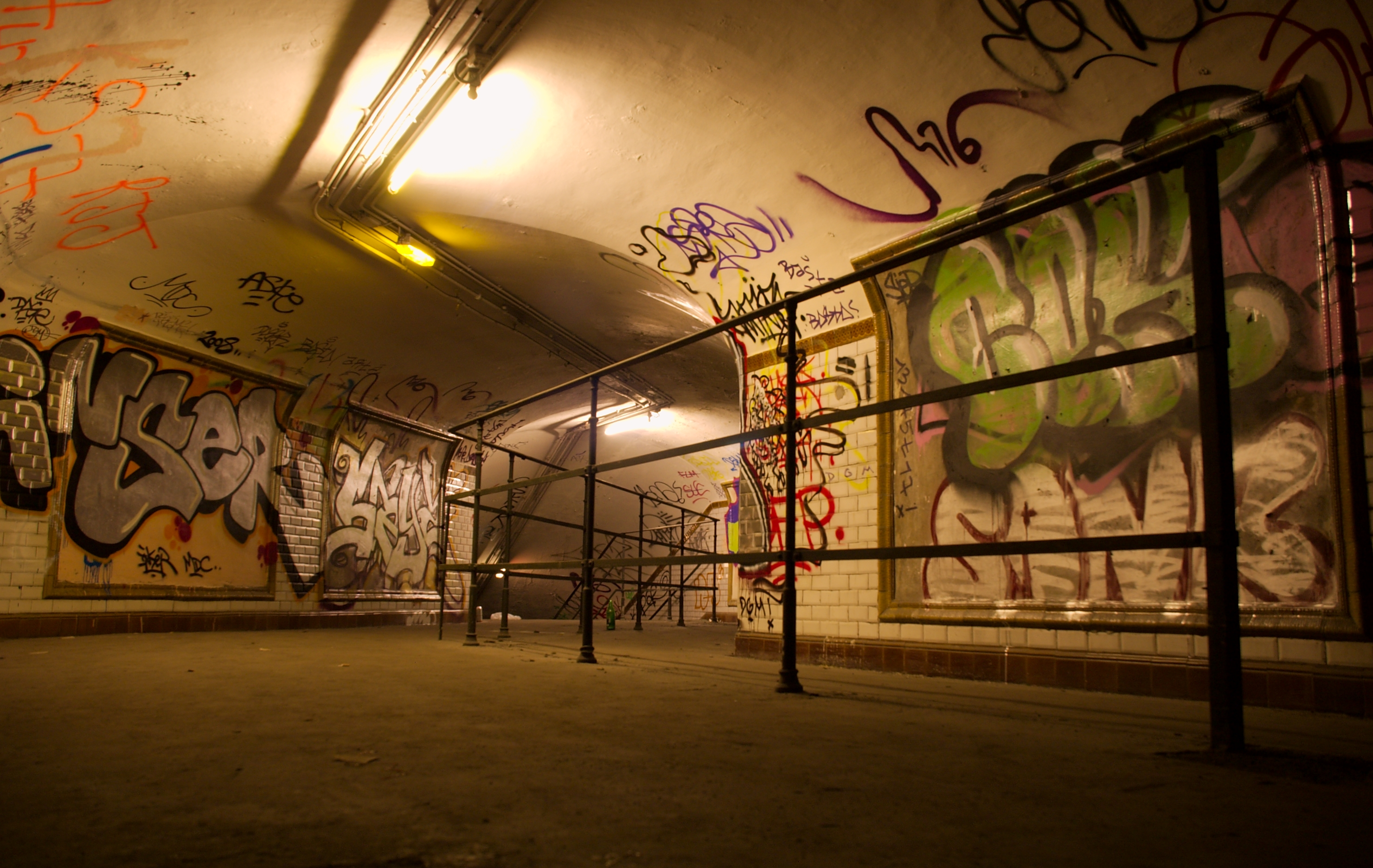
The station is heavily graffitied.

One of Saint-Martin platforms between République and Strasbourg–Saint-Denis
