= Square Saint-Gilles Grand Veneur - Pauline-Roland =

Urban park in Paris, France

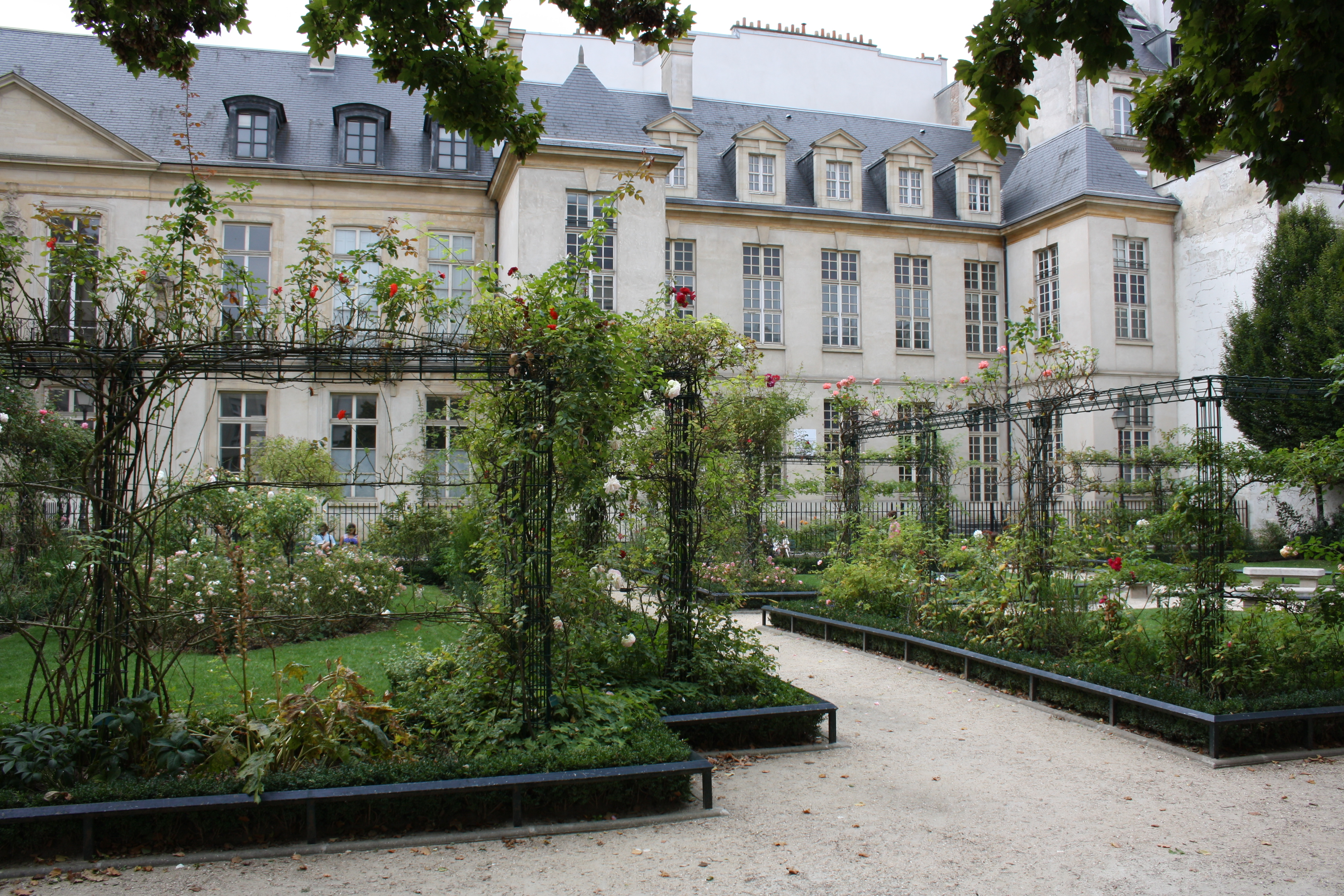
- Interactive map of Square Saint-Gilles Grand Veneur - Pauline-Roland
- Type: Urban garden
- Location: 3rd arrondissement, Paris
- Coordinates: 48°51′33″N 2°21′55″E
- Area: 0.244 acres (0.099 ha)
- Created: 1988
- Status: Open all year
- Public transit: Located near the Métro stations Chemin Vert and Saint-Sébastien–Froissart

The Square Saint-Gilles Grand-Veneur - Pauline-Roland is a small public garden situated in a square in the 3rd arrondissement of Paris, France. The park covers an area of 0.244 acres. The square is hidden by the buildings surrounding it and is accessed by pedestrian streets.

== History ==
The square, which was laid out in 1988, was once a garden belonging to the Hôtel du Grand-Veneur. This building was built during the 17th century and belonged to Hennequin d'Ecquevilly, organiser of the Kings hunt. The square had the name Pauline Roland added in 2010, a French feminist and socialist.

== Features ==
Designed in the style of a French formal garden. Consists of five central lawn beds which are surrounded by flowerbeds. The flowerbeds edges are surrounded by metal arbours covered with climbing roses. Stone benches sit in the gardens centre. Field maples, line the square.

== Access ==
There are two entrances. One via 9 Rue du Grand-Veneur, the latter accessed from the Rue des Arquebusiers. The other by passing through a passage at 12 Rue Villehardouin and then by the small street called the Rue Hesse.

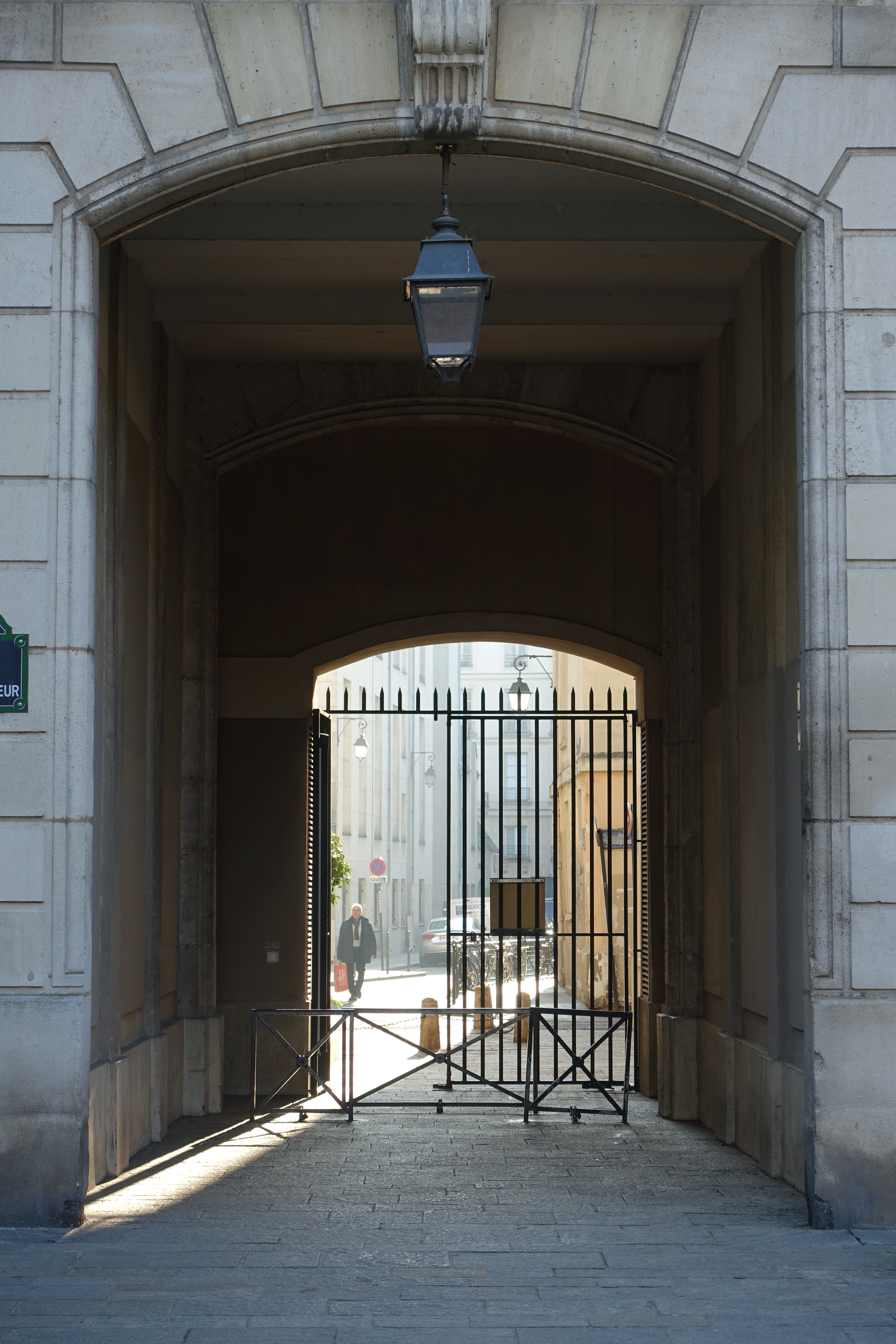

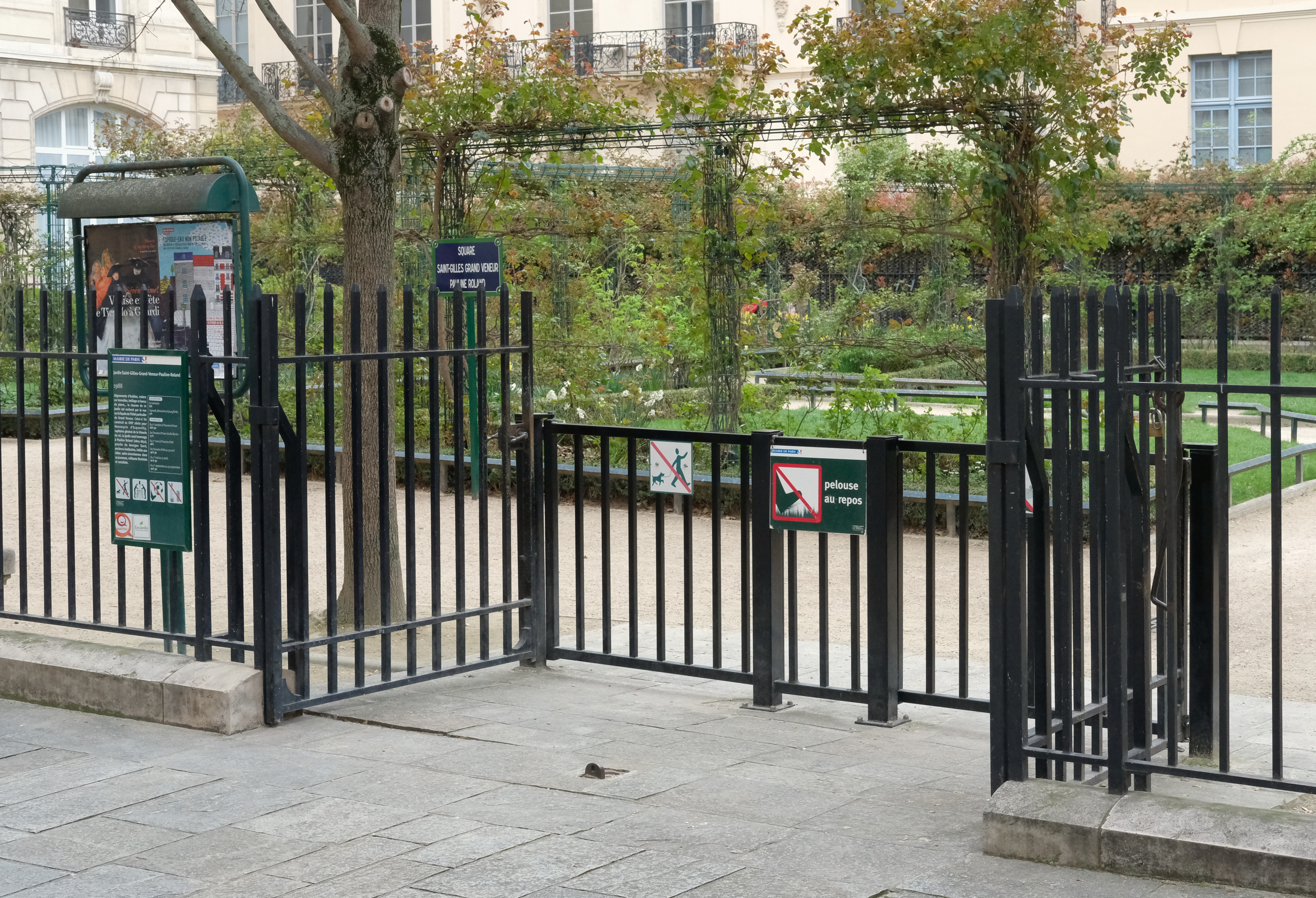

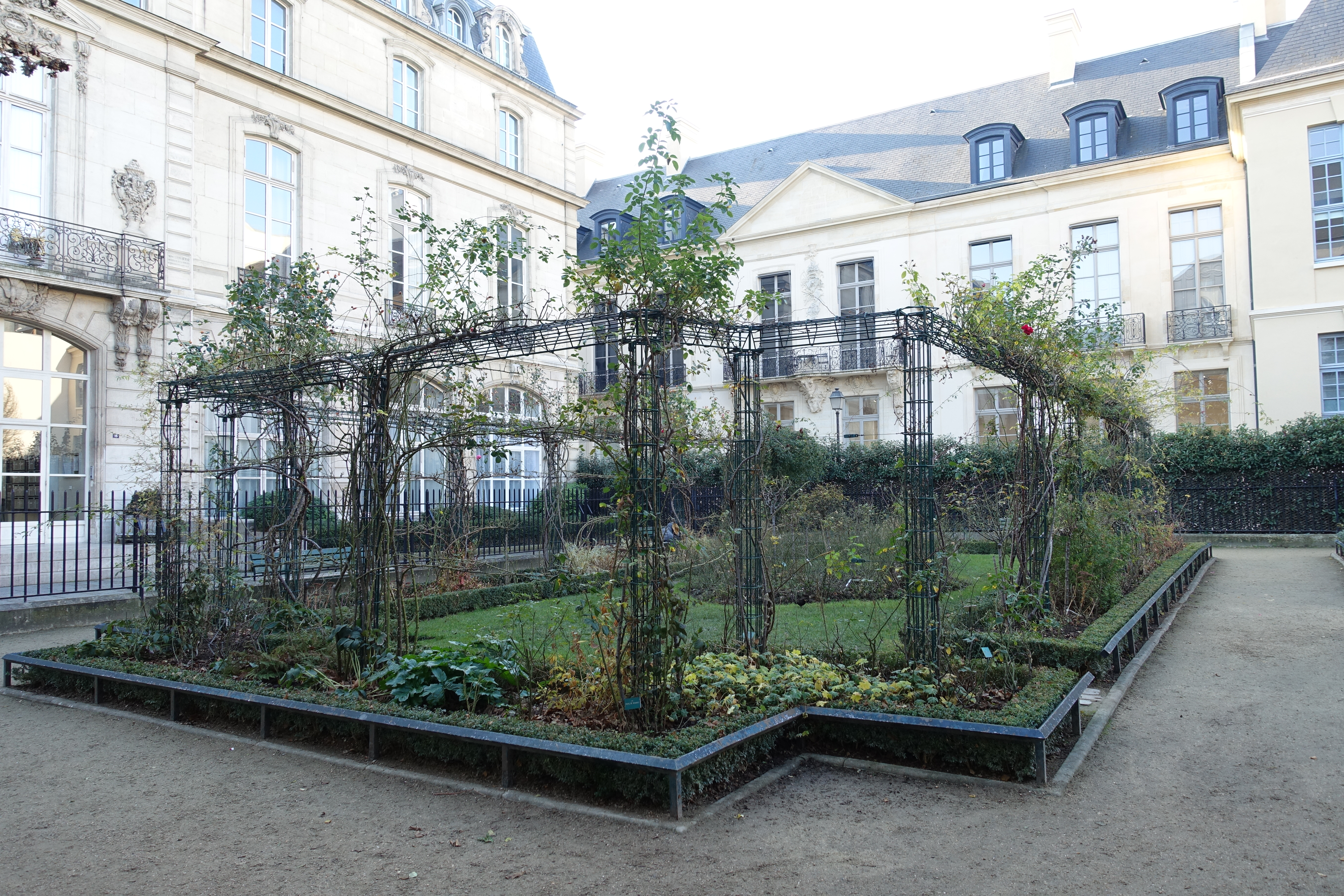
