= Saint-Sébastien–Froissart station =

Metro station in Paris, France

Saint-Sébastien–Froissart
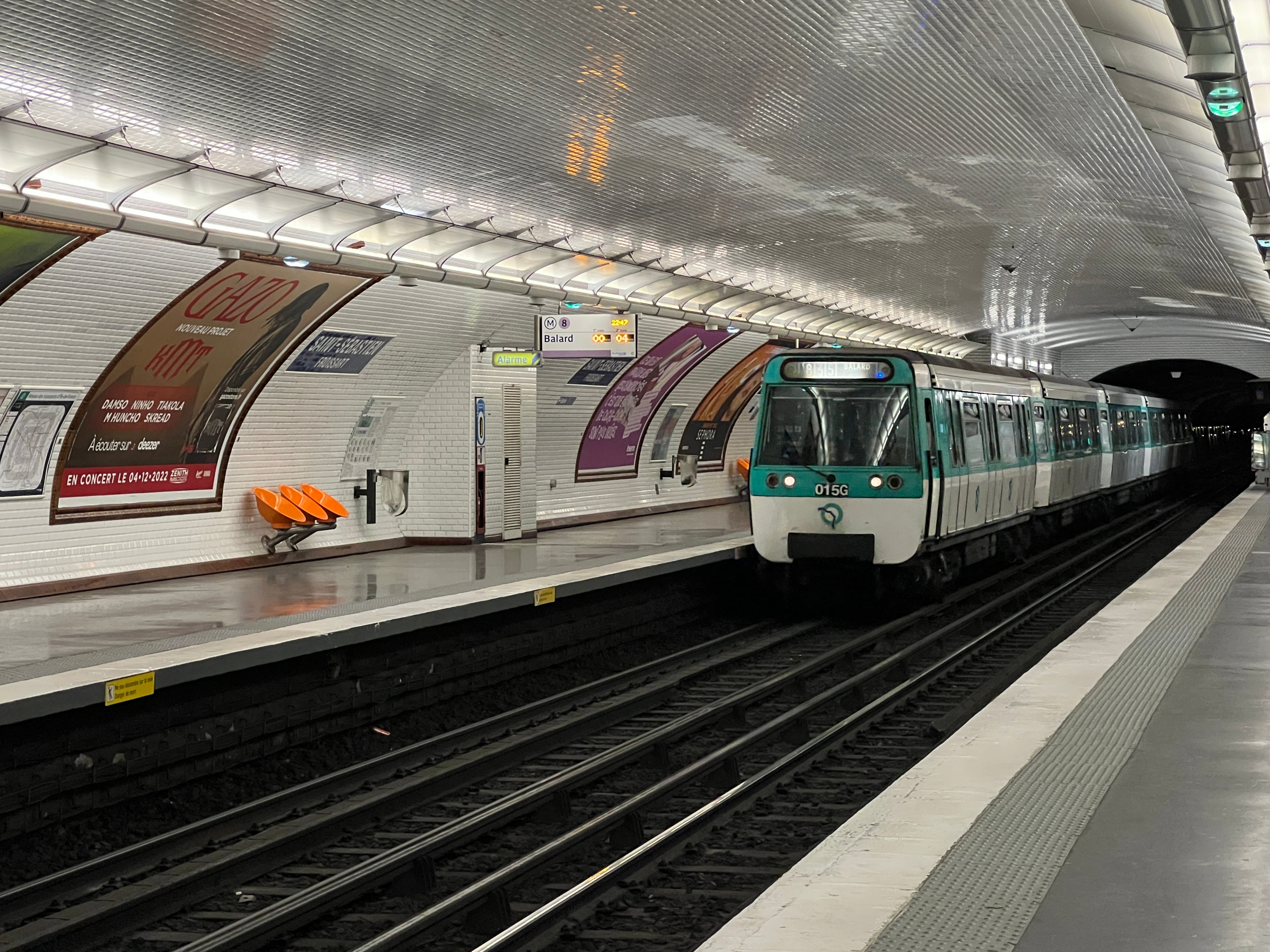

General information
- Location: 3rd and 11th arrondissement of Paris; Île-de-France; France
- Coordinates: 48°51′38″N 2°22′02″E
- System: Paris Métro station
- Owner: RATP
- Operator: RATP
- Line: Paris Metro Paris Metro Line 8
- Platforms: 2 (side platforms)
- Tracks: 2

Construction
- Accessible: No

Other information
- Fare zone: 1

History
- Opened: 5 May 1931
- Former names: Saint-Sébastien (1931–1932)

Services
Preceding station	Paris Metro	Following station
Filles du Calvaire towards Balard	Line 8	Chemin Vert towards Pointe du Lac
Location
- Location within Paris

Saint-Sébastien–Froissart (French pronunciation: [sɛ̃ sebastjɛ̃ fʁwasaʁ]) is a station on Line 8 of the Paris Métro, at the limit between the 3rd and 11th arrondissements. It is named after two streets leading to the Boulevard des Filles du Calvaire, under which it is situated: Rue Saint-Sébastien and Rue Froissart.

== History ==
The station opened on 5 May 1931 as "Saint-Sébastien" with the extension of the line from Richelieu–Drouot to Porte de Charenton. It adopted its current name on 12 January 1932.

Rue Saint-Sébastien (17th century) was named after Saint Sebastian, whereas Rue Froissart (1804) was named after the poet and writer Jean Froissart (c. 1337–1400).

As part of the RATP's Renouveau du métro programme, the station was completely renovated by 2 October 2006. The decoration of the platforms in the interwar style of the former Compagnie du chemin de fer métropolitain de Paris (CMP) was thus renewed and completed with new lighting. The advertising frames with plant motifs were recreated in brown earthenware, no longer in the original honey colour.

In 2021 with 1,151,192 passengers were recorded at Saint-Sébastien–Froissart station, relegating it to the 266th position of the network's stations in terms of attendance that year.

== Passenger services ==
=== Access ===
The station has two entrances, each consisting of a fixed staircase adorned with a balustrade and a Dervaux-type candelabra:

- Access 1 Rue Froissart - Pablo Picasso Museum, leading to no. 3 Boulevard Beaumarchais;
- Access 2 Rue Saint-Sébastien, located to the right of no. 8 of the same boulevard.

=== Station layout ===
Street Level

B1	Mezzanine for platform connection

Platform level	Side platform, doors will open on the right
Platform level	toward Balard	← toward Balard (Filles du Calvaire)
Platform level	toward Pointe du Lac	toward Pointe du Lac (Chemin Vert) →
Platform level	Side platform, doors will open on the right

=== Platforms ===
Saint-Sébastien–Froissart is a station with a standard configuration. It has two platforms separated by the metro tracks located in the centre; the vault is elliptical. The decoration is in the style used for most of Métro stations. The lighting strips are white and rounded in the Gaudin style of the Métro revival of the 2000s, while the bevelled white ceramic tiles cover the walls, the vault and the tunnel exits. The advertising frames are made of earthenware with brown plant motifs (a shade that did not originally exist); the name of the station is also made of earthenware in the interwar style of the original CMP. The seats are in an orange Akiko style (replacing wooden slatted benches).

It is one of the few stations in the network whose ceramic decoration in the CMP style is no longer original, having been completely reconstructed during the 2006 renovation.

=== Bus connections ===
The station is served by line 91 of the RATP Bus Network and, at night, by lines N01 and N02 of the Noctilien network.

== Nearby ==
- Musée Picasso
- Saint-Denys-du-Saint-Sacrement
- Square Saint-Gilles Grand Veneur - Pauline-Roland
- Jardin de l'Hôtel-Salé - Léonor-Fini
