= Filles du Calvaire station =

Metro station in Paris, France

Filles du Calvaire
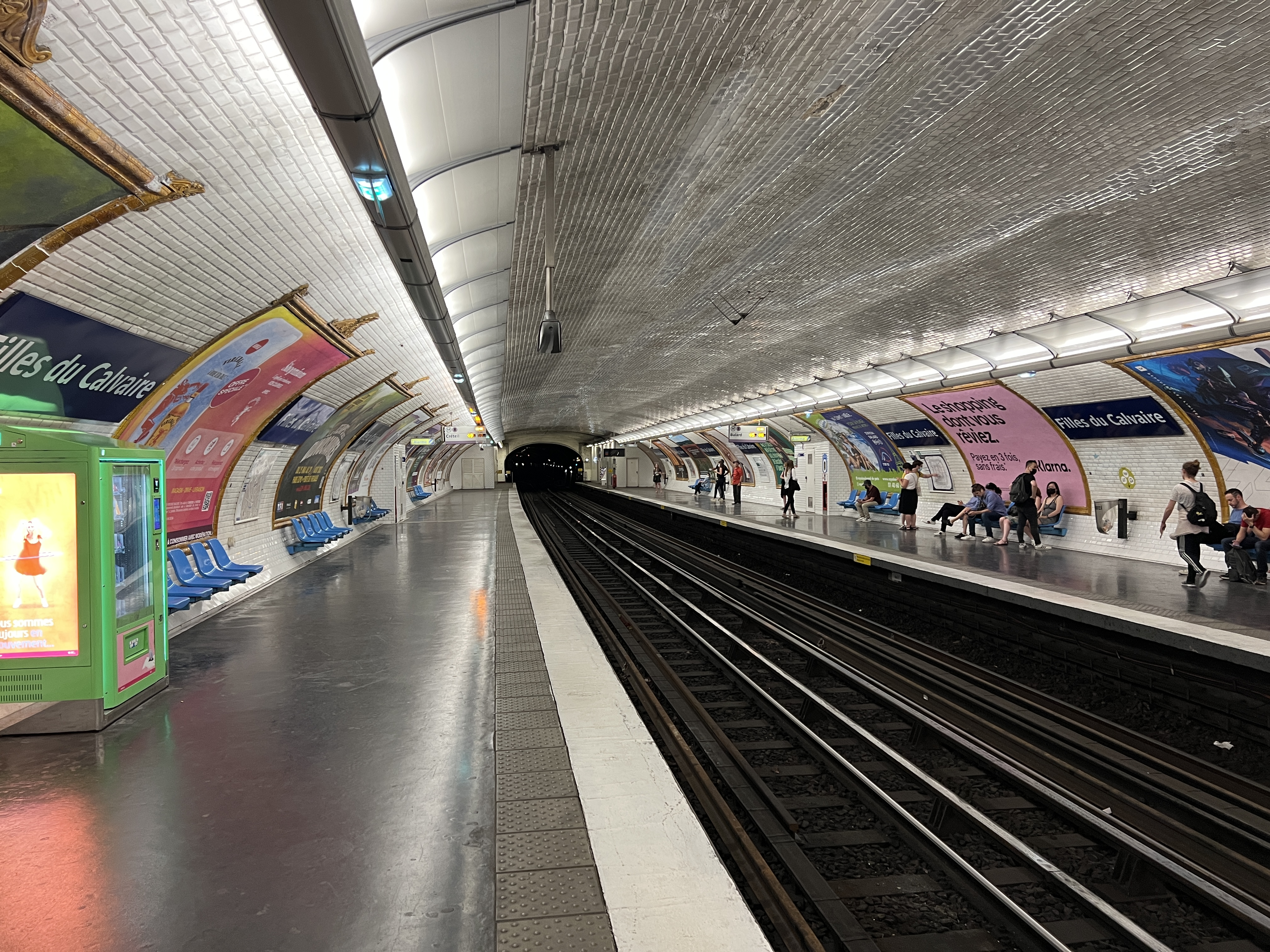

General information
- Location: 3rd and 11th arrondissement of Paris; Île-de-France; France
- Coordinates: 48°51′51″N 2°21′58″E
- System: Paris Métro station
- Owner: RATP
- Operator: RATP
- Line: Paris Metro Paris Metro Line 8
- Platforms: 2 (side platforms)
- Tracks: 2

Construction
- Accessible: No

Other information
- Fare zone: 1

History
- Opened: 5 May 1931

Services
Preceding station	Paris Metro	Following station
Strasbourg–Saint-Denis towards Balard	Line 8	Saint-Sébastien–Froissart towards Pointe du Lac
Location
- Location within Paris

Filles du Calvaire (French pronunciation: [fij dy kalvɛːʁ]) is a station on Line 8 of the Paris Métro, at the limit between the 3rd and 11th arrondissements.

== History ==
The station opened on 5 May 1931 with the extension of the line from Richelieu–Drouot to Porte de Charenton.

It is named after the Boulevard des Filles du Calvaire, which is named after the Calvairiennes or Filles du Calvaire (Daughters of Calvary), who were an order of reformed Benedictine sisters. Antoinette d'Orléans and Père Joseph founded the order in Poitiers, in 1617. The convent was later moved to Paris before it was closed in the French Revolution.

Although named after the boulevard, it is located just north of it, under the Boulevard du Temple.

As of July 2026, Line 8 services to République are suspended due to renovations at République station. Line 8 trains will skip said station and continue to the following station. This suspension is expected to last until April 2027.

== Station layout ==
Street Level

B1	Mezzanine for platform connection

Platform level	Side platform, doors will open on the right
Platform level	toward Balard	← toward Balard (Strasbourg–Saint-Denis)
Platform level	toward Pointe du Lac	toward Pointe du Lac (Saint-Sébastien–Froissart) →
Platform level	Side platform, doors will open on the right

== See also ==
- Cirque d'hiver, located just southeast of the station
