= Saint-Denys-du-Saint-Sacrement =

Church in Paris, France

- Saint-Denys-du-Saint-Sacrament

Religion
- Affiliation: Catholic Church
- Province: Archdiocese of Paris
- Rite: Roman Rite
- Status: Active

Location
- Location: 68 Rue de Turenne, 3rd arrondissement (Le Marais)
- Interactive map of Saint-Denys-du-Saint-Sacrement
- Coordinates: 48.8600°N 2.3652°E

Architecture
- Style: Neoclassical
- Groundbreaking: 1826
- Completed: 1845

Website
- Website of the church

The Church of Saint-Denys-de-Saint-Sacrament is a Roman Catholic church located in the Marais quarter, at 68 Rue de Turenne in the 3rd arrondissement of Paris, France. It was constructed between 1826 and 1835, It took its name from Saint Denys, the first bishop of Paris, and from the church of the Benedictines of the Perpetual Order of the Saint Sacrament, which had previously occupied the site. The early church was too small for the growing congregation and was replaced by the larger present church. It is an example of Neoclassical architecture, a style very popular in Paris the first half of the 19th century.

The artworks in the church include a notable painting by Eugène Delacroix, The Pieta or The Deposition from the Cross (1826–1835). The church was classified as a Monument historique in 1914.

== History ==
The first church on the site was founded in 1684 in the former residence of the Vicomte de Turenne, Henri de la Tour d'Auvergne, which had been built in 1620. It was established by monks of the Benedictine order of the Perpetual Adoration of the Saint Sacrifice. In 1792, during the French Revolution, the building was closed and the monks expelled. It was reopened in 1801 by Napoleon under his Concordat with the Pope.

The neighborhood was growing quickly and the church was soon too small for the congregation. A new church was built between 1826 and 1835 by the architect Étienne-Hippolyte Godde, whose other major works of the period included Notre-Dame-de-Bonne-Nouvelle (1823–1829), the restoration of the badly damaged church of the Abbey of Saint-Germain-des-Prés (1819–1827) and the chapel and gate of Père Lachaise Cemetery in Paris.

== Exterior ==
The exterior of the church is Neoclassical, a style very popular during the French Restoration and the July Monarchy in the mid-19th century. Its design is based upon the plans of early Roman Paleo-Christian basilicas from the first and second centuries. Its plan is very similar to that of another church by Godde, Saint-Pierre-du-Gros-Caillou, which he had completed not long before.

The facade has six columns with Ionic order capitals. The first four columns form a peristyle, or porch. It is a very sober style, with a minimum of decoration. It is topped by a triangular fronton, with figures by Jean-Jacques Feuchère (1807–1852) completed in 1845. The figures represent the three theological virtues; Faith in the center, with a chalice and the host; Hope on the left, seated at a table, writing in Hebrew; and Charity is on the right, protecting an infant and gesturing toward a book which displays an extract of the Hymn to Charity by Saint Paul.

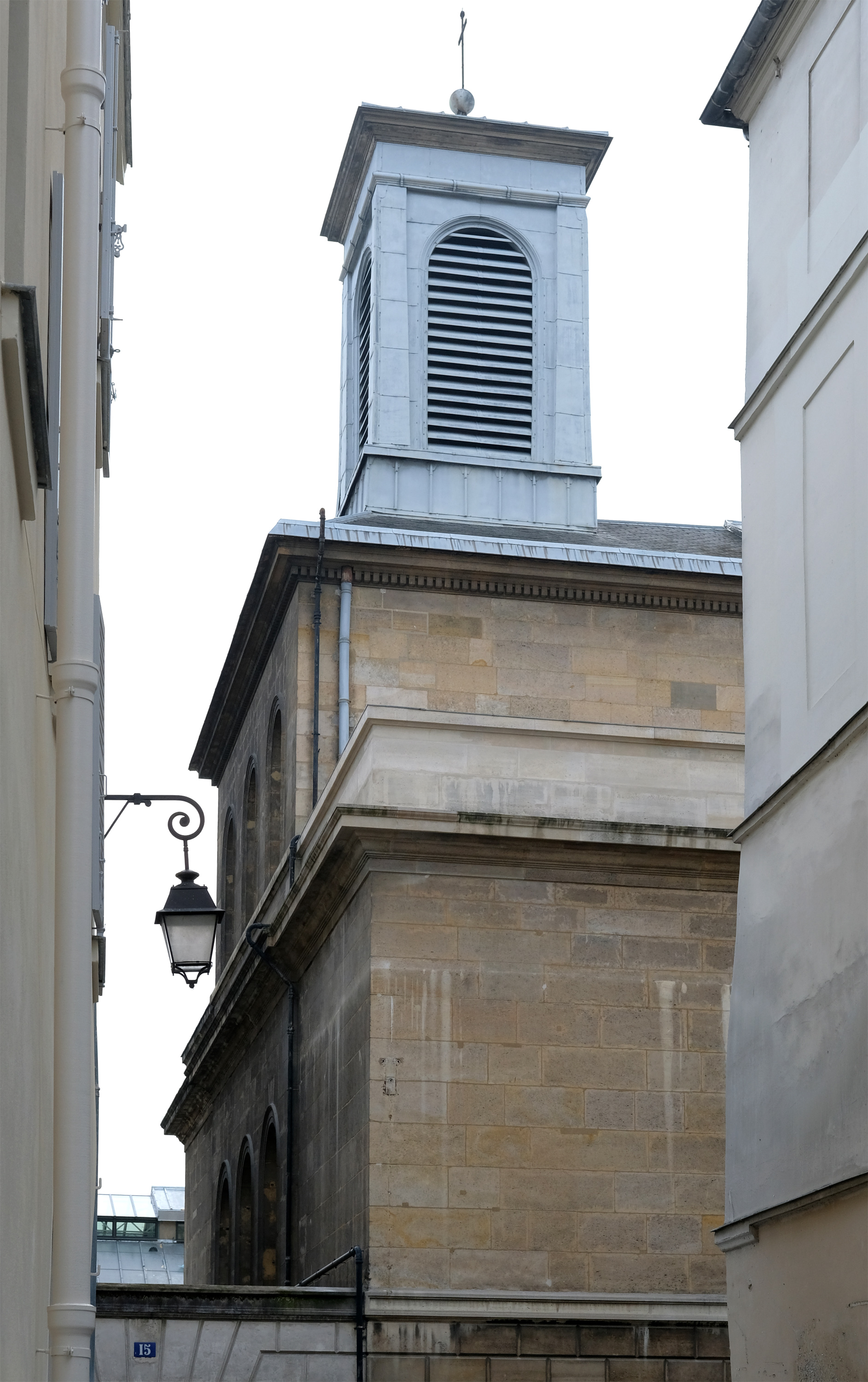
The bell tower

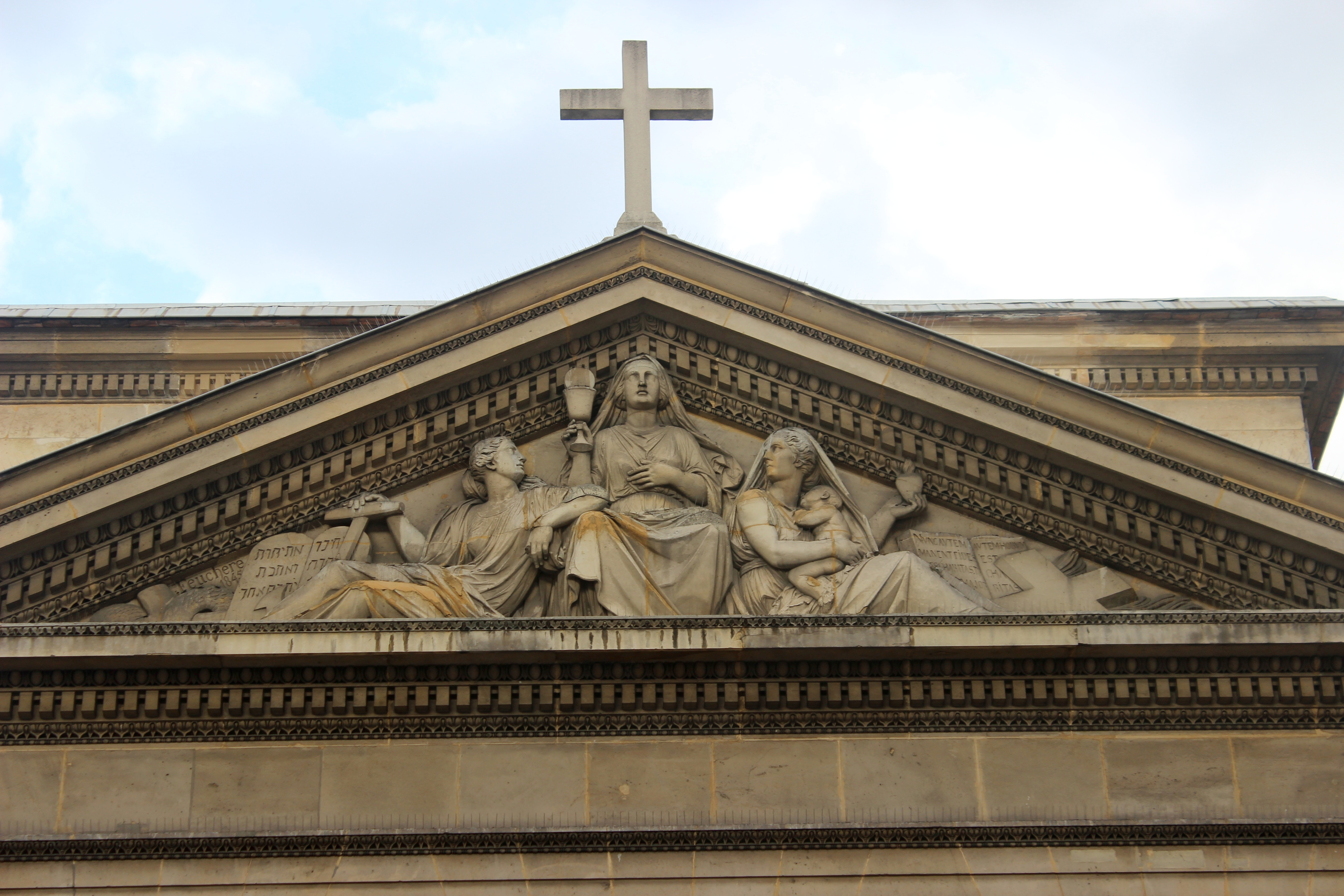
Sculpture in the Fronton, or pediment

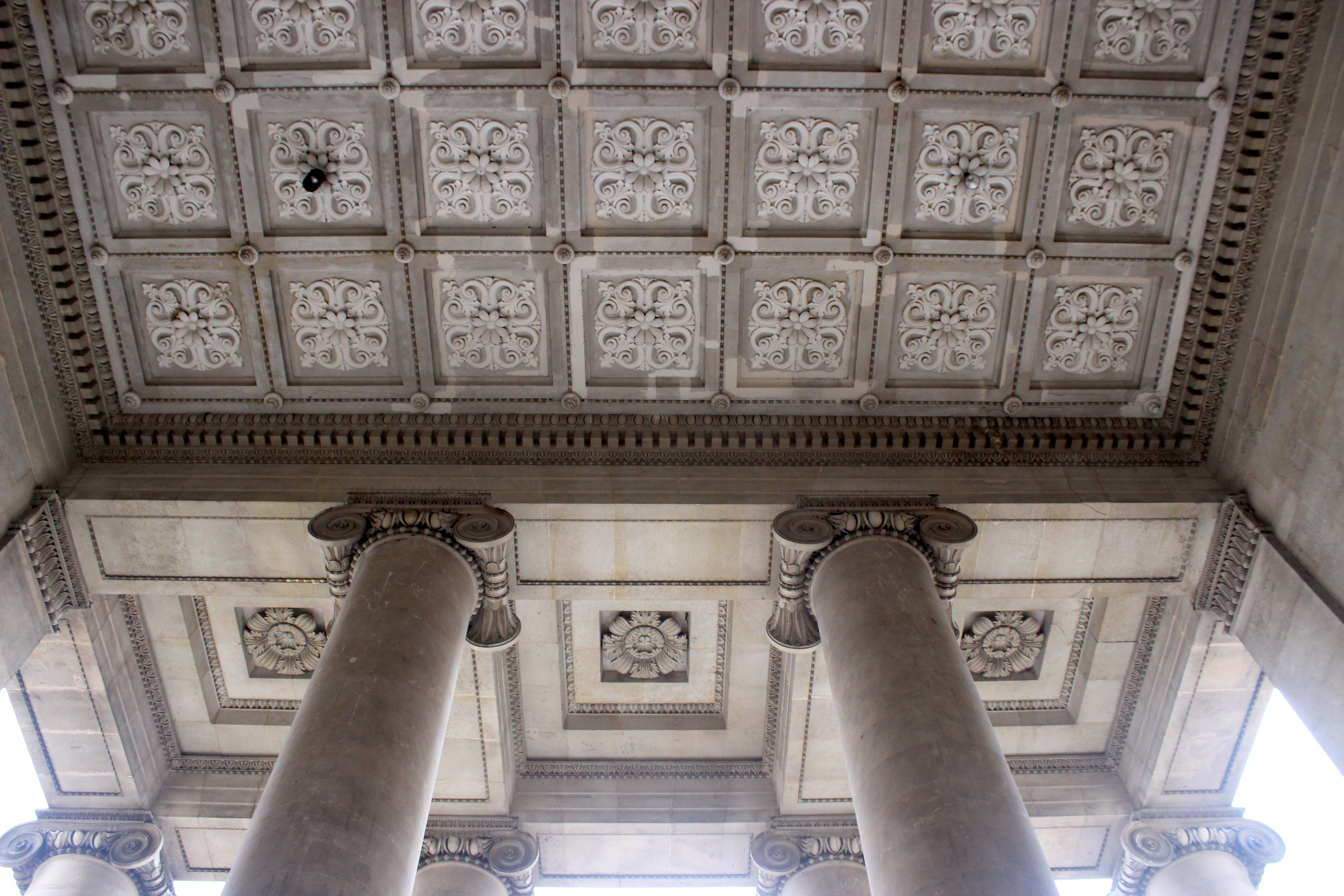
Ceiling of the porch

== Interior ==
The interior architecture of the church is sober and formal in its classical structure, in keeping with the French church architecture of the early 19th century, but greatly enlivened by numerous paintings. The nave is separated from the outer aisles by rows of columns with classical columns of the Ionic order. The barrel-vaulted ceiling is composed of square panels decorated with floral designs in gold and ivory colors.

The choir is covered with a half-dome, which is decorated with a painting depicting "The Eternal Father, Christ and the Virgin", painted by Abel de Pujol (1787–1861), whose major works include the ceiling of the grand staircase of the Louvre and the ceiling of the Paris Bourse. The worship of the Virgin Mary had become very popular in France in the mid-19th century, with the proclamation of the dogma of the Immaculate Conception by Pope Pius IX in 1854 and reports of visions of the Virgin by Bernadette Soubirous in Lourdes in 1858, and by others in Paris and other sites during the century.

Interior of the church, facing the choir

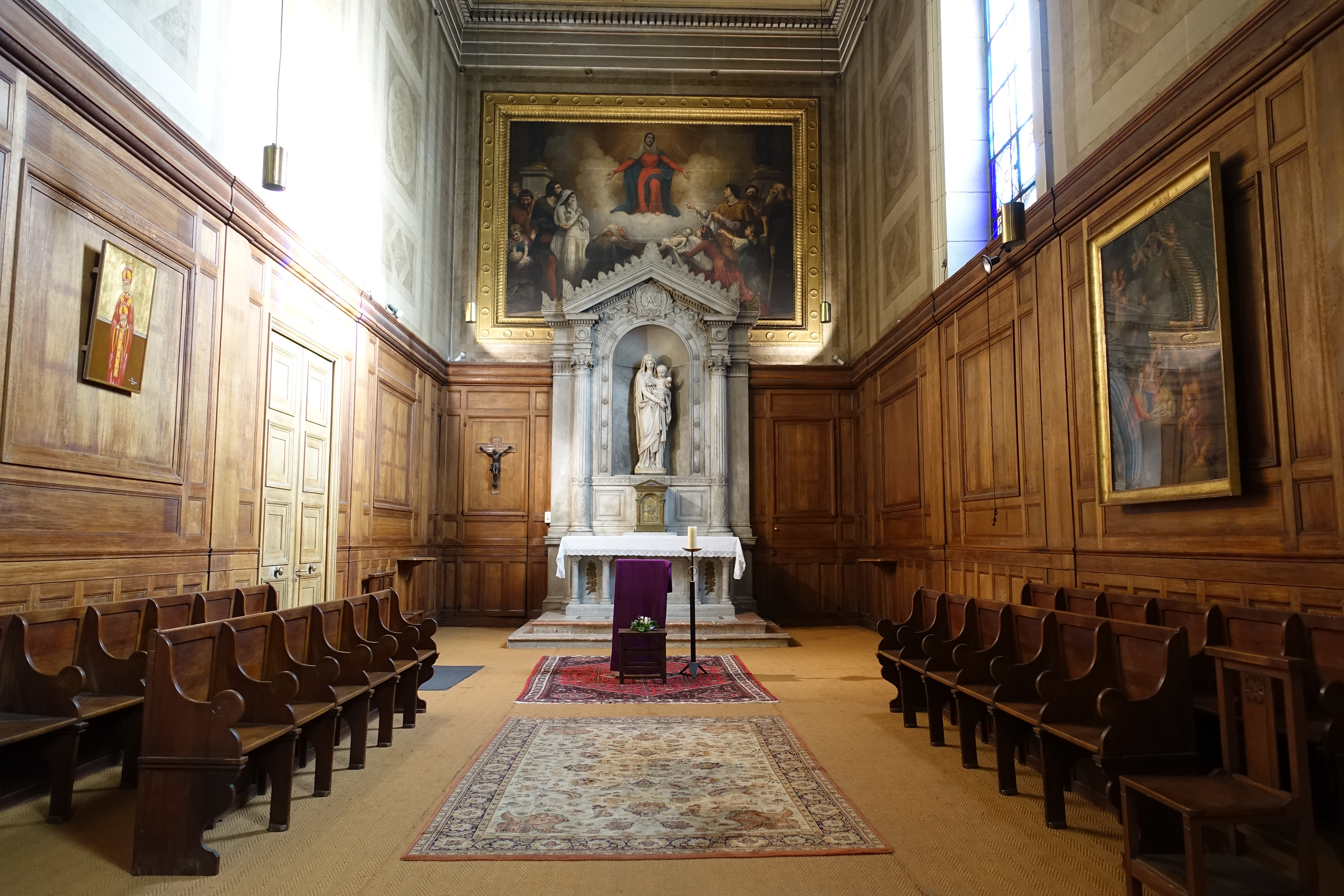
Detail of the South Chapel, with statue of the Virgin Mary

== Art and decoration ==
The dome of the choir displays the painting The Eternal Father, Christ and the Virgin, by Abel de Pujol (1787–1861). Pujol was a student Jacques-Louis David and received the Prize of Rome in 1811. He participated in the decoration of the Louvre, the Palais Brongniart and the Château de Fontainebleau.

The decoration of the choir includes a trompe-l'oeil painting imitating a sculptured frieze depicting Saint Denys preaching to the Gauls, also by Pujol. Pujol expressed his admiration for Michelangelo and the Italian Renaissance in the large, expressive figures and their costumes. The altar of the church is a modern work (1995) by sculptor Marc Couturier.

The Chapel of Sainte-Genevieve, to the left of the entrance, displays the most famous work in the church, The Pieta or Deposition from the Cross by Eugène Delacroix, showing the suffering of the Virgin Mary as she holds the body of Christ on her knees. Delacroix wrote later that he preferred to paint the work in the church on Sundays: "The music of the mass greatly exalted me." Delacroix also avoided idealizing the subjects, showing their humanity. The poet and essayist Charles Baudelaire wrote about the painting, "This masterpiece left in my spirit a profound trench of melancholy".

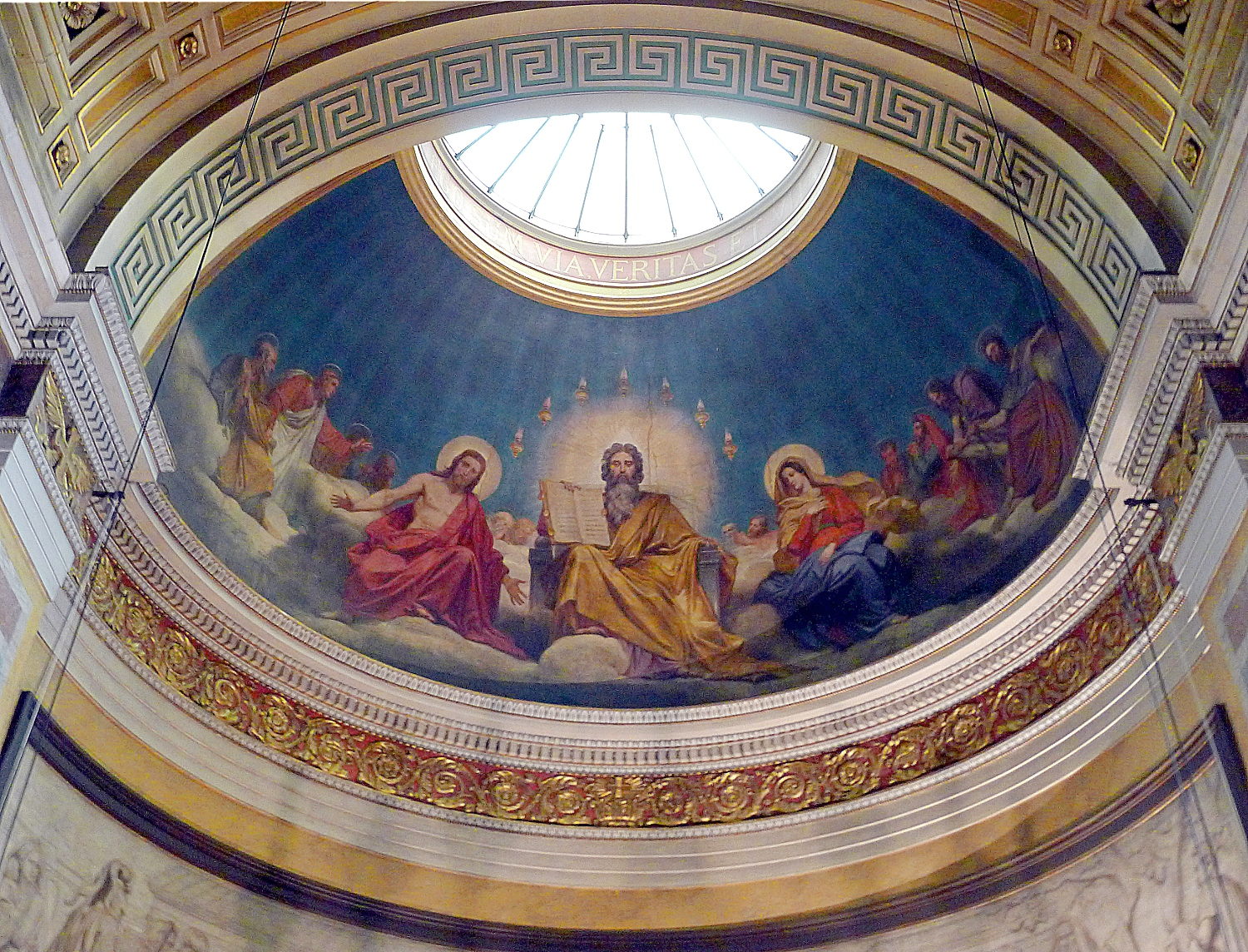
"The Eternal Father, Christ and the Virgin", by Alexandre-Denis Abel de Pujol, in cupola

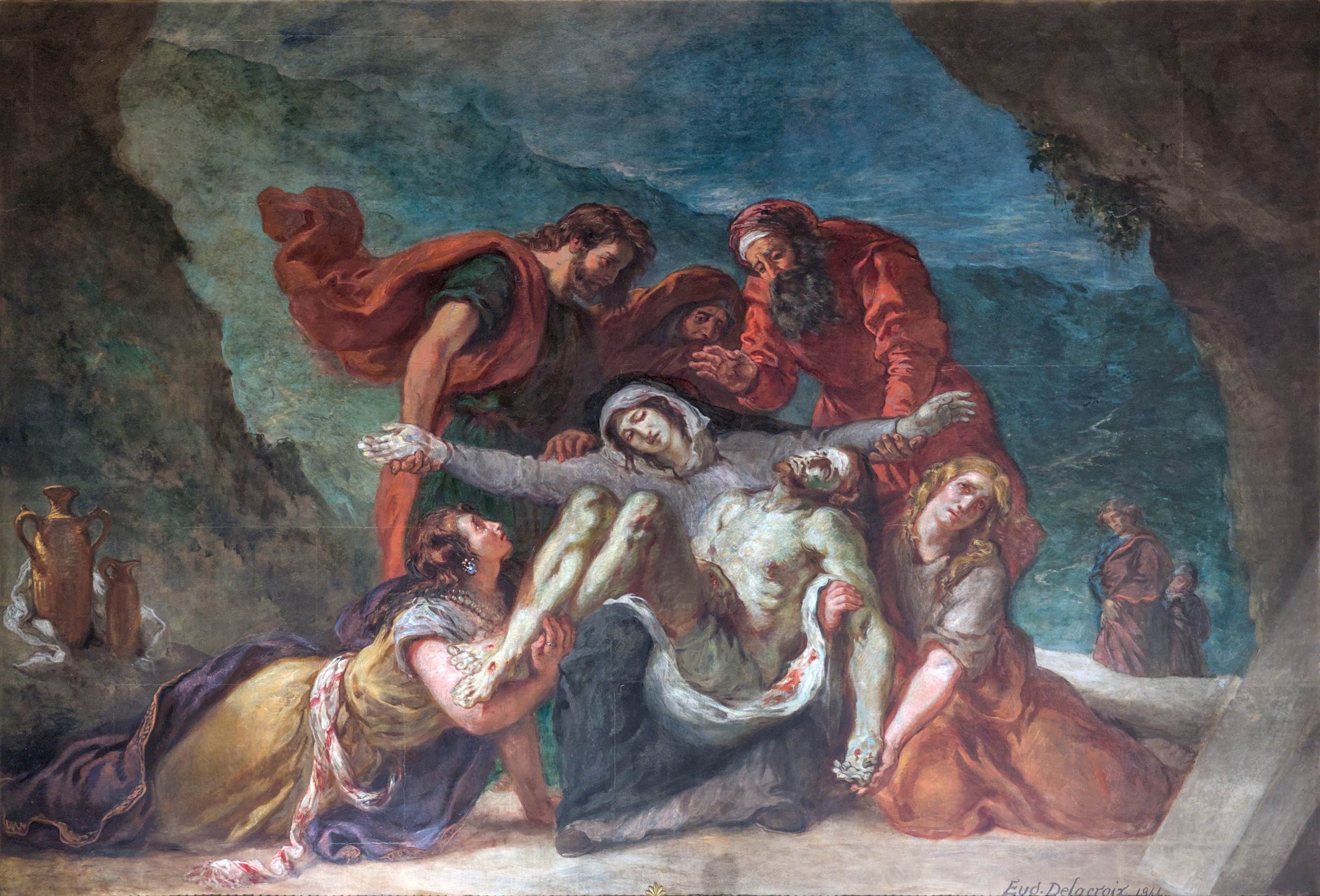
"Pieta" by Eugène Delacroix (1842–1844) Chapel of Saint Genevieve

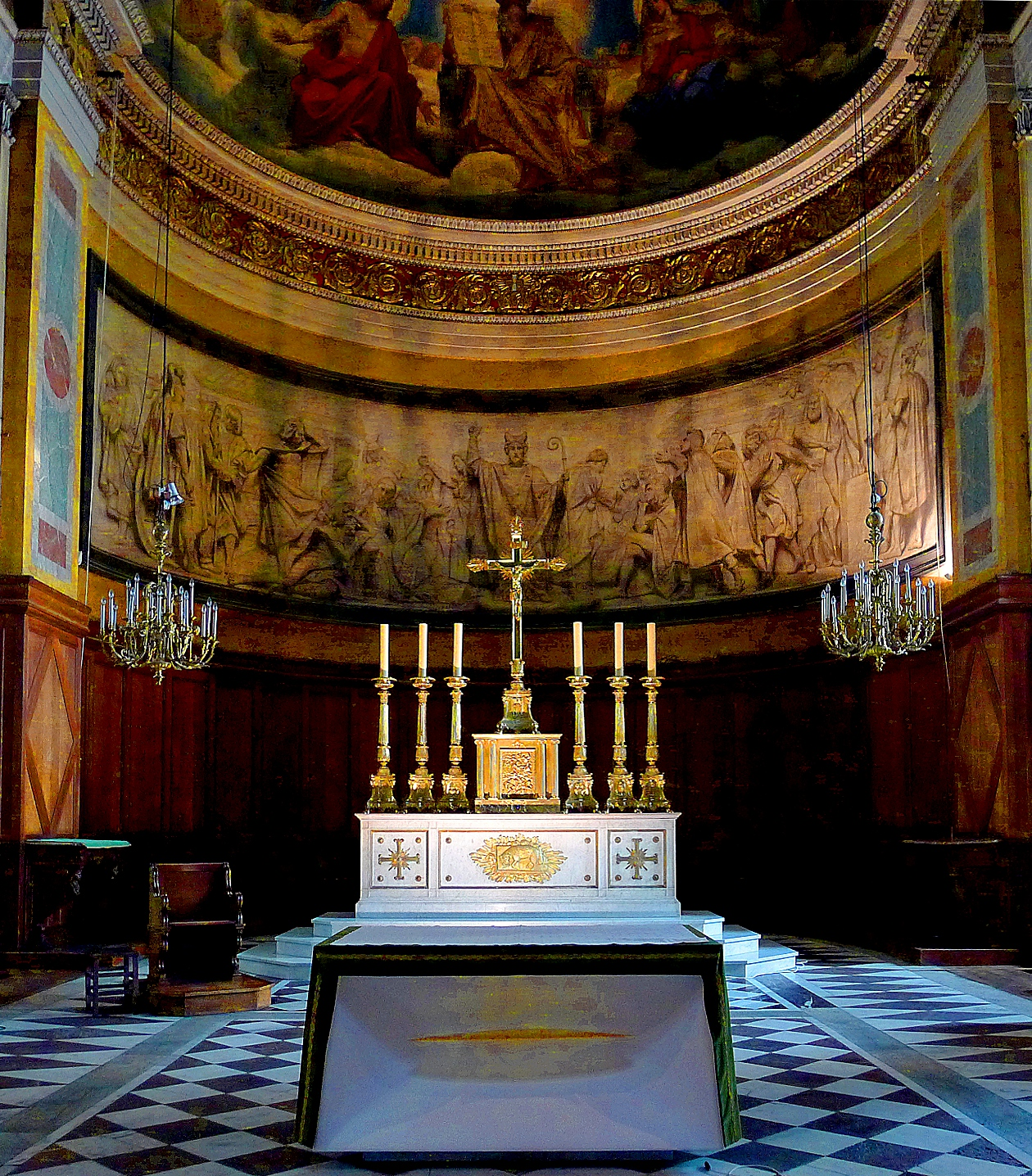
trompe-l'oeil frieze depicting "Saint Denys preaching to the Gauls", by Abel de Pujol

=== Stained-glass windows ===
The 19th-century stained-glass windows have a large amount of white glass, to increase the amount of light in the church. The colors change with the light throughout the day.

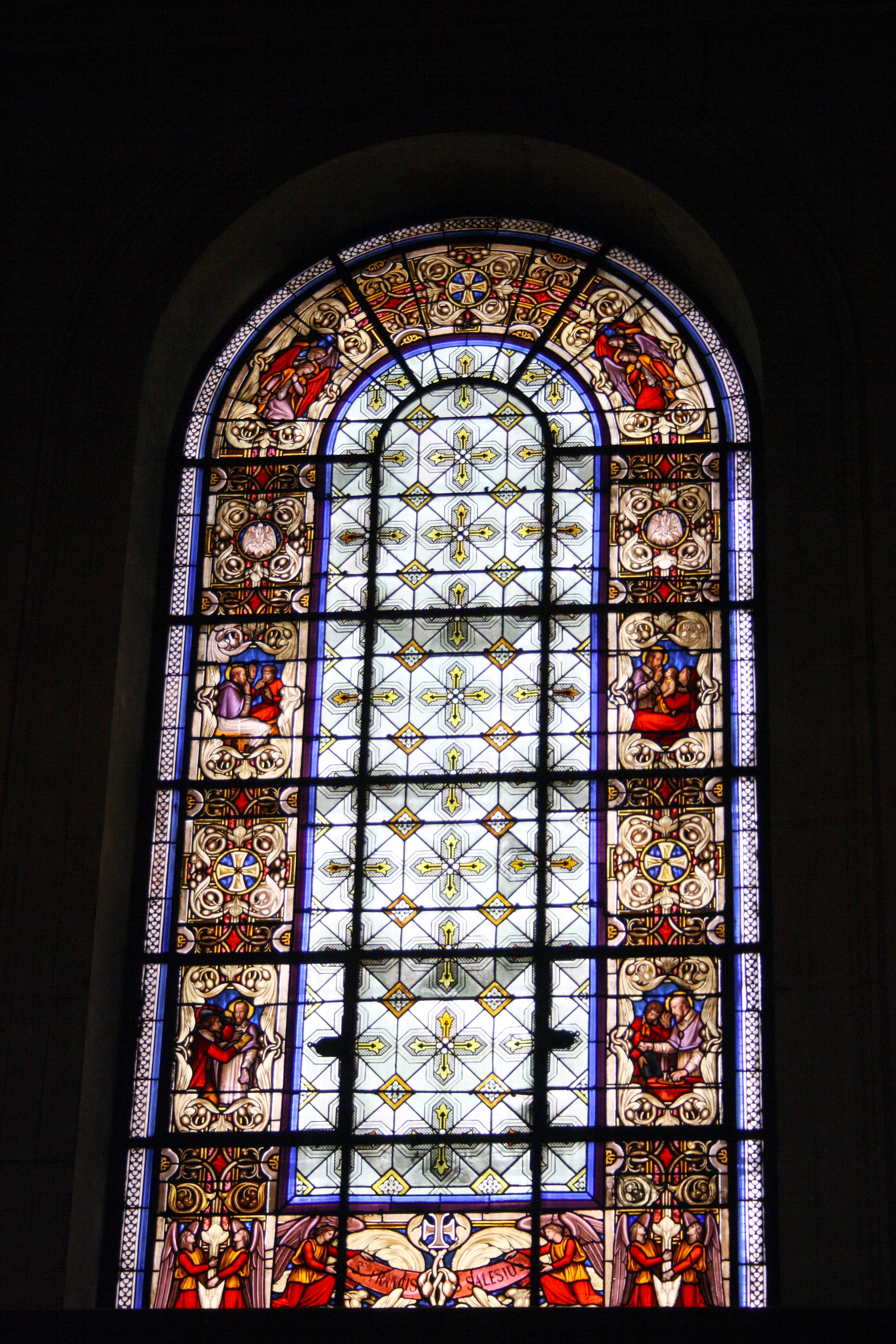

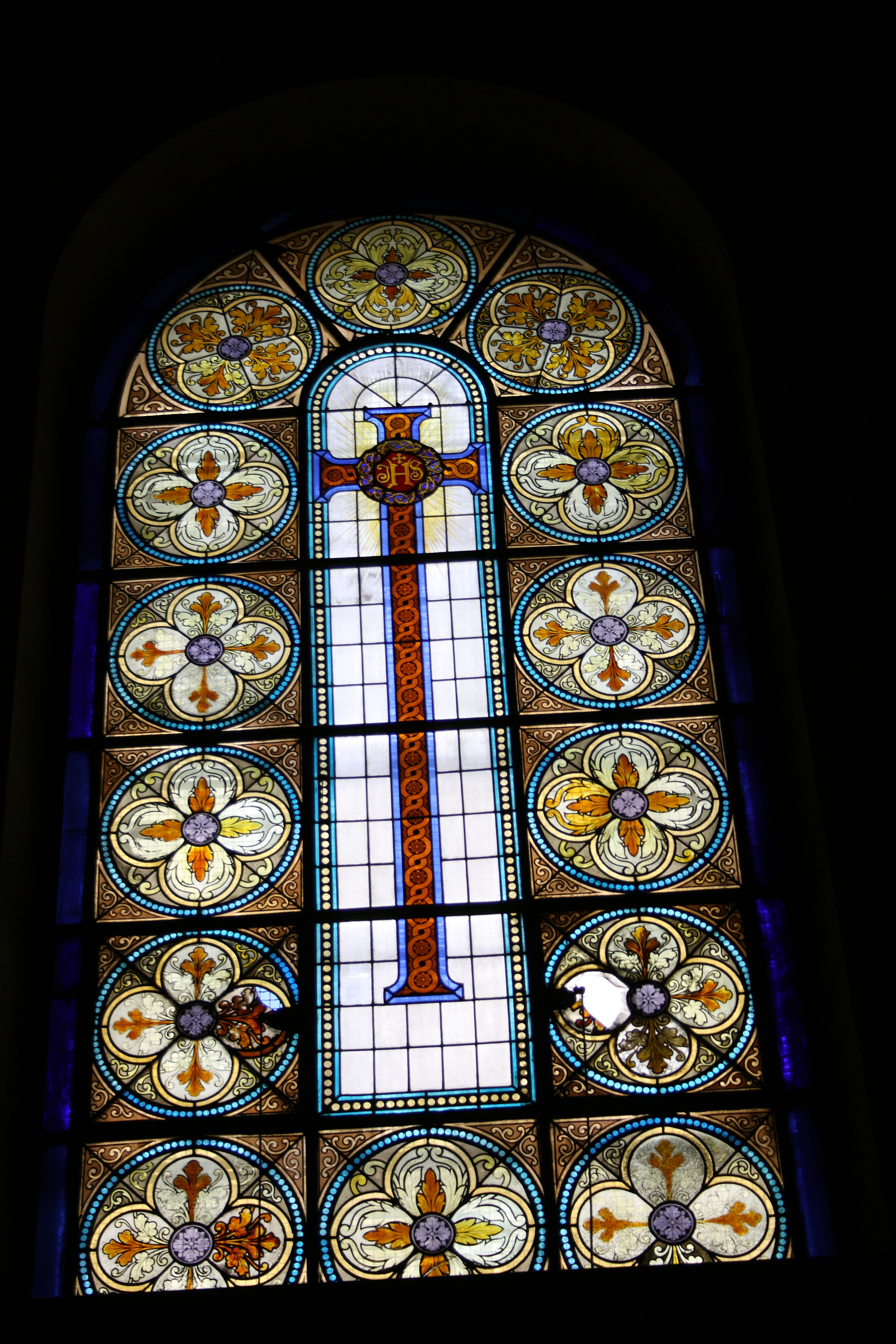

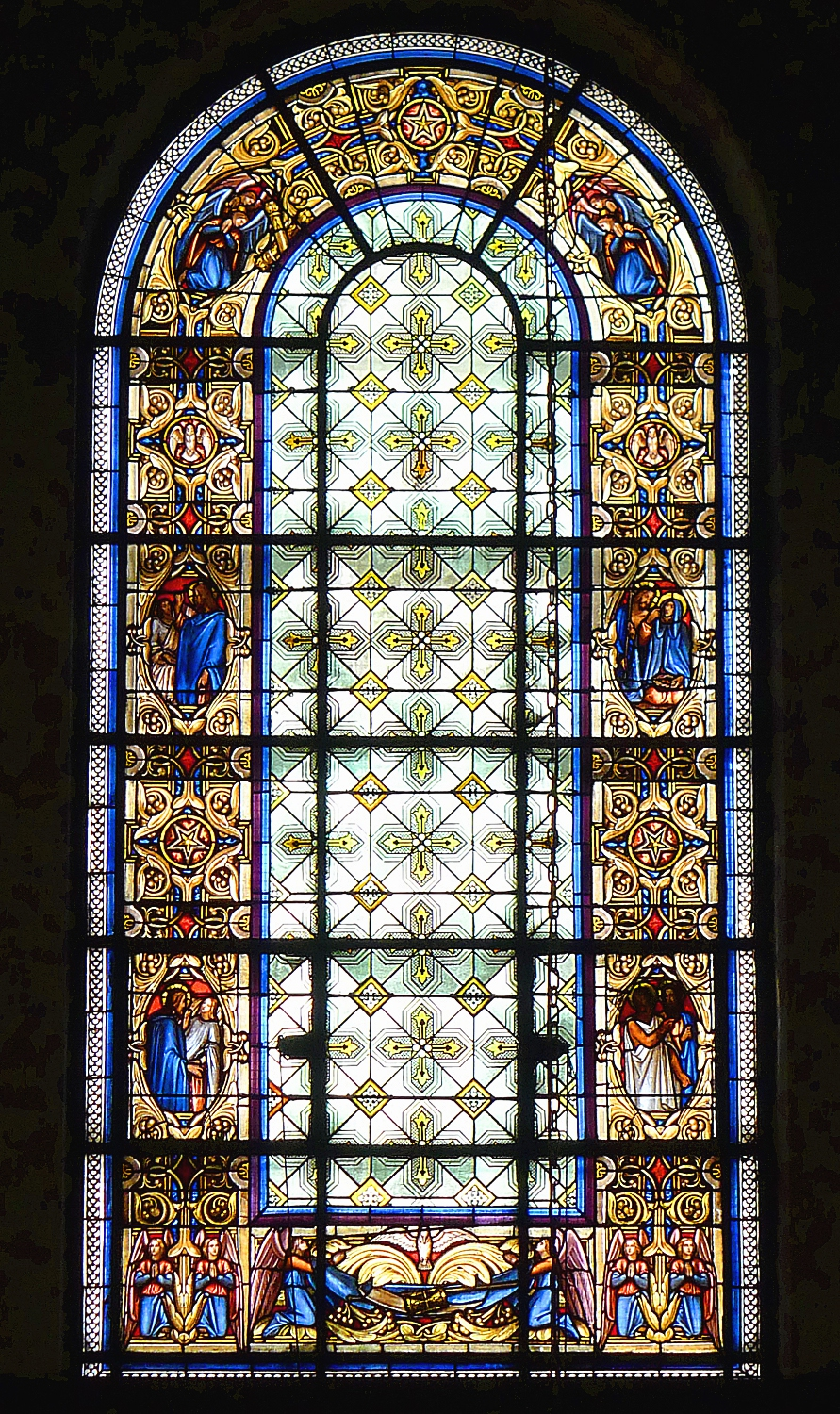

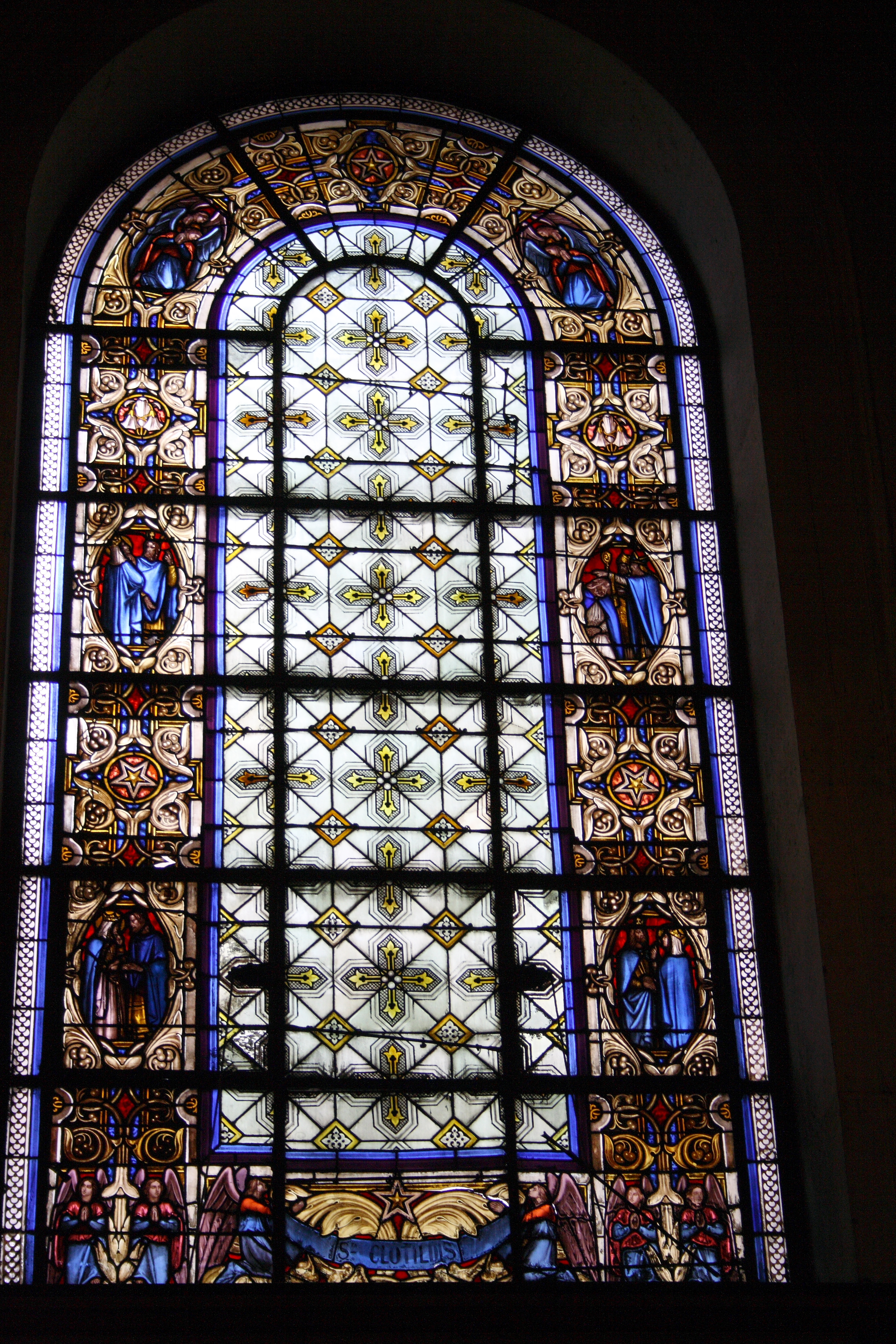

== Organs ==
The grand organ of the church, on the tribune over the portal to the nave, was built by Daublaine-Callinet in 1839. It was restored by Aristide Cavaillé-Coll in 1886, and by Gutschenritter in 1970. The smaller organ in the choir was built by Cavaillé-Coll in 1867.

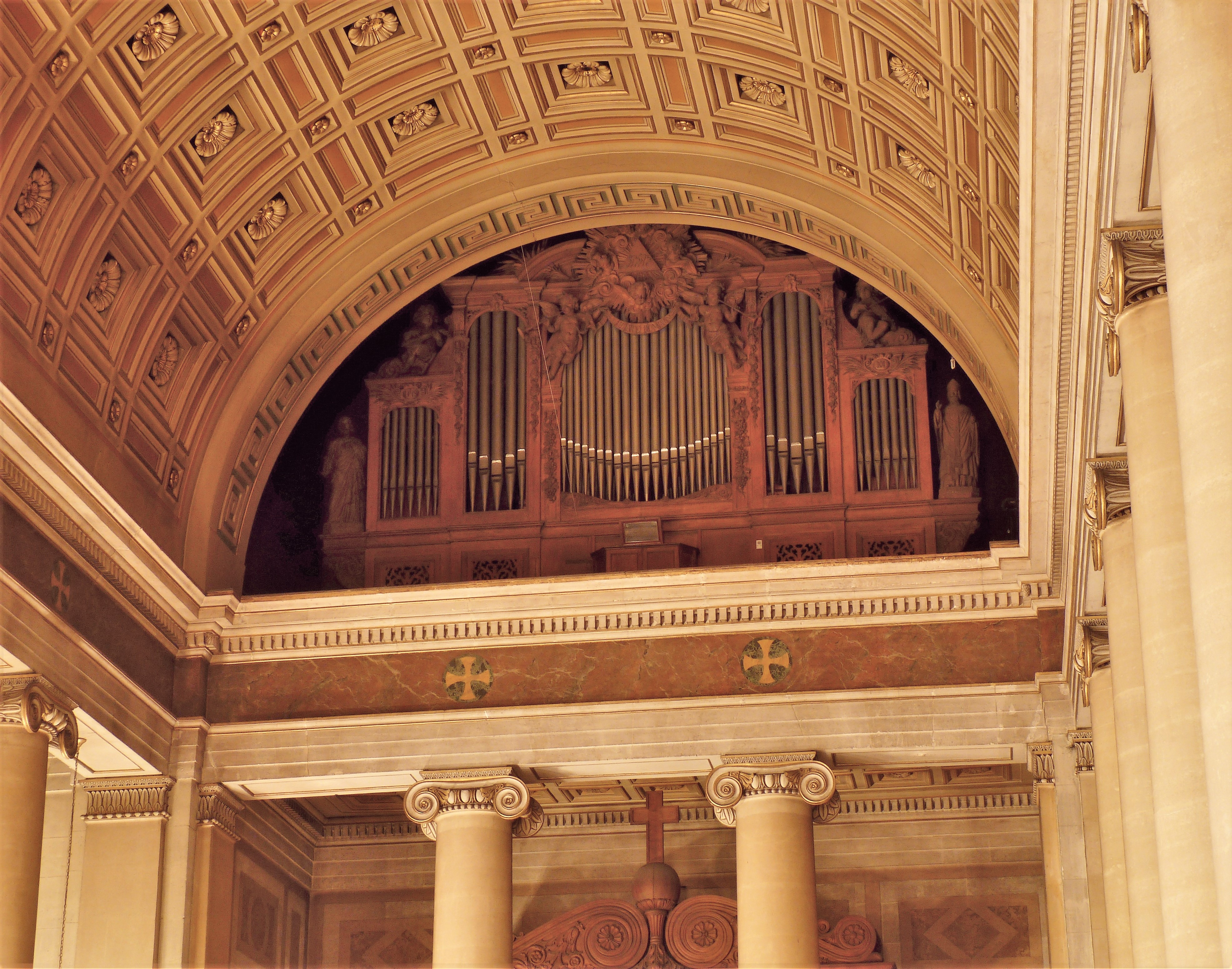
The grand organ (1839).

Location of the grand organ.

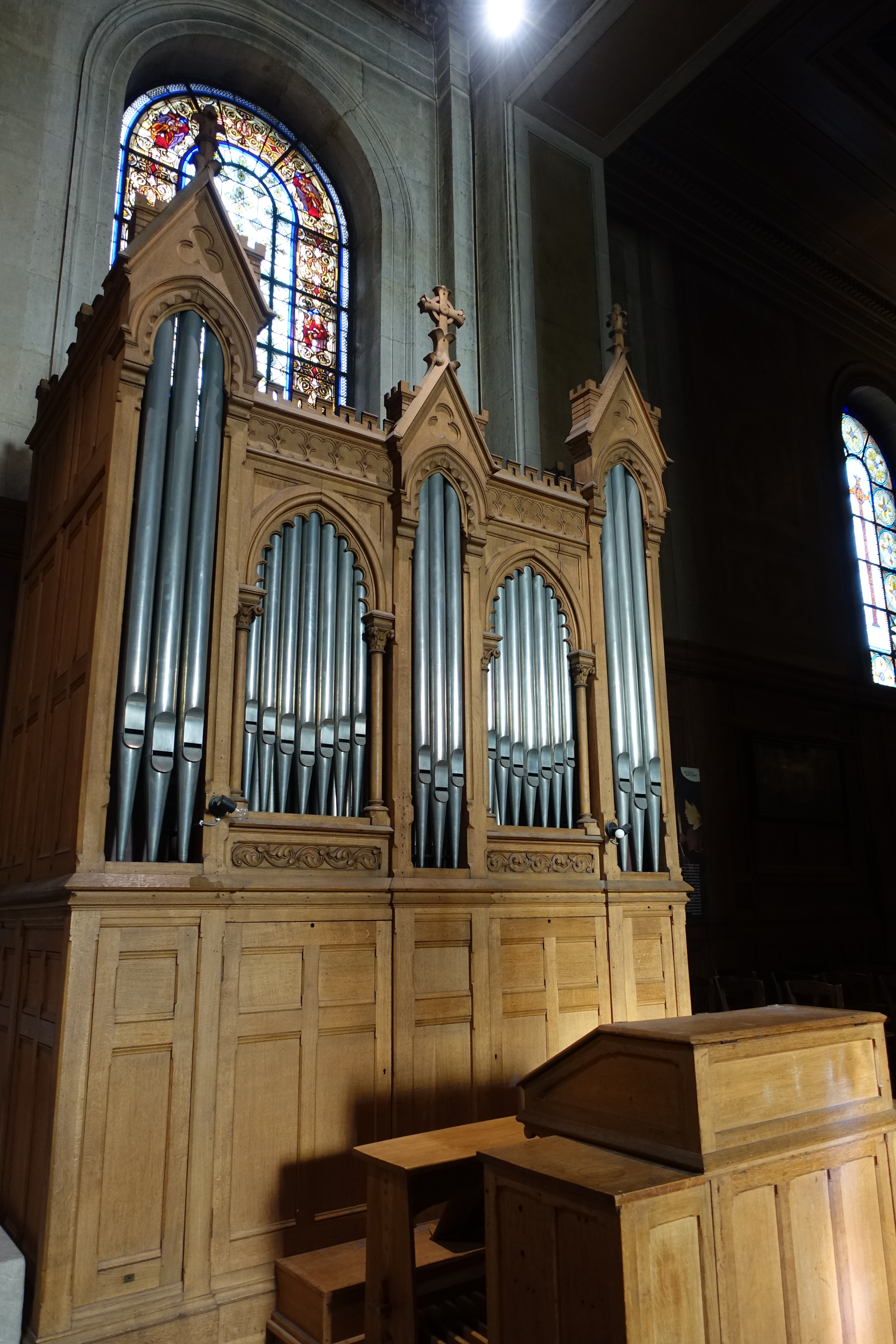
The choir organ (1867).

== Bibliography (in French) ==
- Dumoulin, Aline; Ardisson, Alexandra; Maingard, Jérôme; Antonello, Murielle; Églises de Paris (2010), Éditions Massin, Issy-Les-Moulineaux, ISBN 978-2-7072-0683-1 (in French)

== External links (in French) ==
- Website of the church
- fr:Église Saint-Denys-du-Saint-Sacrement Link to the French Wikipedia article on the church
