= Chemin Vert station =

Paris Métro station

Chemin Vert
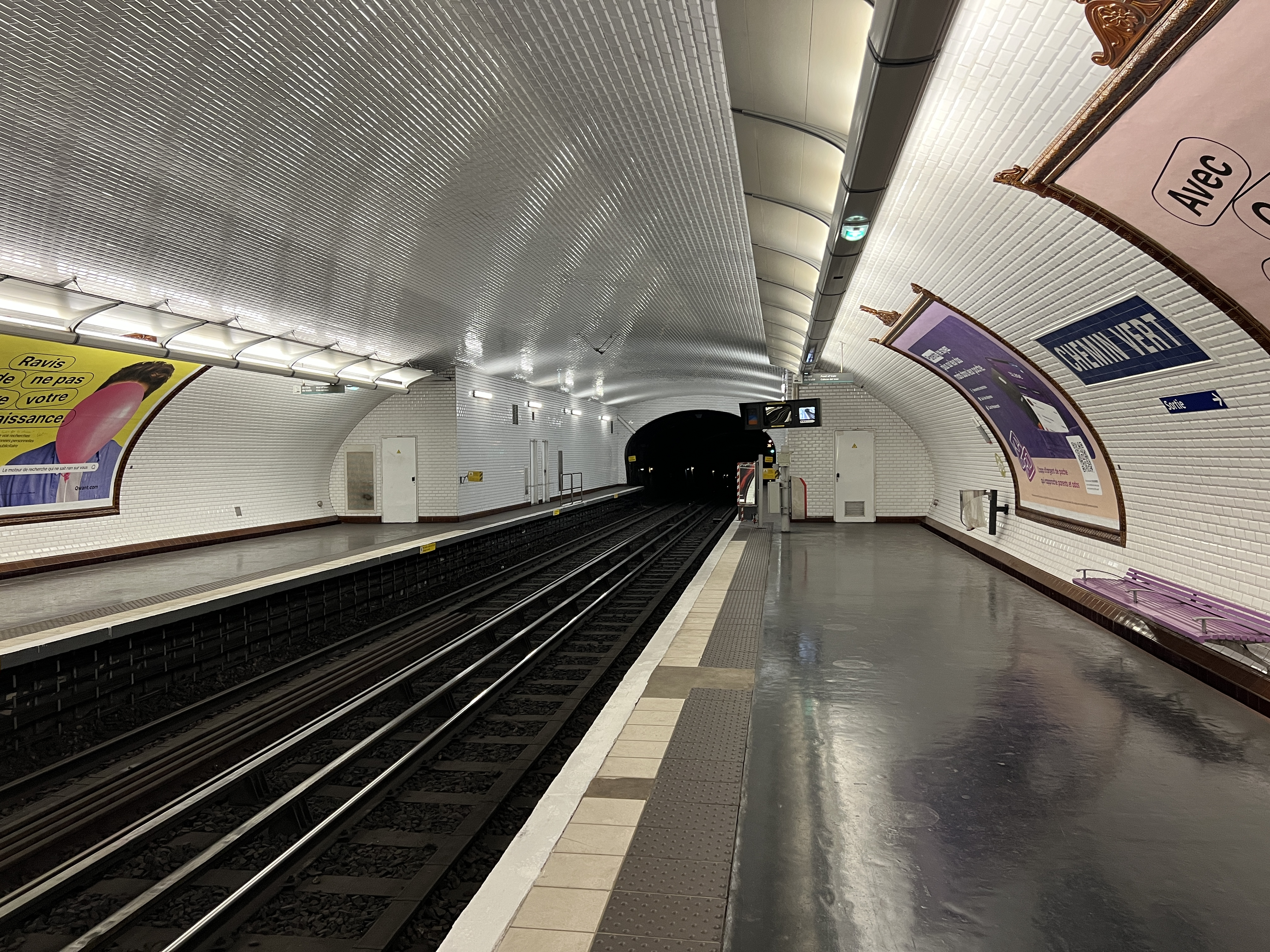

General information
- Location: 3rd arrondissement of Paris; Île-de-France; France
- Coordinates: 48°51′24″N 2°22′06″E
- System: Paris Métro station
- Owner: RATP
- Operator: RATP
- Line: Paris Metro Paris Metro Line 8
- Platforms: 2 (side platforms)
- Tracks: 2

Construction
- Accessible: No

Other information
- Fare zone: 1

History
- Opened: 5 May 1931

Services
Preceding station	Paris Metro	Following station
Saint-Sébastien–Froissart towards Balard	Line 8	Bastille towards Pointe du Lac
Location
- Location within Paris

Chemin Vert (French pronunciation: [ʃəmɛ̃ vɛʁ]) is a station on Line 8 of the Paris Métro. Located in the 3rd arrondissement, it is named after the Rue du Chemin-Vert just to the east.

== Location ==
The station is situated under Boulevard Beaumarchais in the 3rd arrondissement of Paris, between Rue Saint-Gilles and the Rue du Chemin-Vert. Oriented along a north–south axis, it is sandwiched between Saint-Sébastien-Froissart and Bastille stations.

== History ==
The station opened on 5 May 1931 with the extension of the line from Richelieu–Drouot to Porte de Charenton. The Rue du Chemin-Vert (green path) follows the route of an old footpath through the middle of market gardens. In 1868 the street was extended from the Rue des Amandiers-Popincourt to the Barrière des Amandiers, a gate on the former Wall of the Farmers-General.

As part of the RATP's Renouveau du Métro programme, the station was completely renovated, starting with the platforms in 2001, then it was the turn of the corridors opening on 18 December 2006. The decoration of the quays in the interwar style of the former CMP was thus renewed and completed with new lighting, but the advertising frames with plant motifs were recreated in brown earthenware and no longer in honey colour as in the original.

On 20 March 2018, half of the nameplates on the station's platforms were temporarily replaced by the RATP to celebrate the arrival of spring, in parallel with the distribution of flowers to passengers, as in five other stations. The new plaques depict a green landscape crossed by a path, where a wooden sign bearing the name "Chemin Vert" was depicted, referring to the origin of the name of the Rue du Chemin-Vert.

In 2020, 685,294 passengers entered this station.

== Passenger services ==
=== Access ===
The station has two entrances, each consisting of a fixed staircase adorned with a balustrade and a Dervaux-type candelabra:

- Access 1 Boulevard Beaumarchais / Rue Saint-Gilles - Place des Vosges - leading to nos. 59 and 61 of the boulevard;
- Access 2 Boulevard Beaumarchais / Rue du Chemin-Vert - located to the right of nos. 52 and 54 of the same boulevard.

=== Station layout ===
Street Level

B1	Mezzanine for platform connection

Platform level	Side platform, doors will open on the right
Platform level	toward Balard	← toward Balard (Saint-Sébastien–Froissart)
Platform level	toward Pointe du Lac	toward Pointe du Lac (Bastille) →
Platform level	Side platform, doors will open on the right

=== Platforms ===
Chemin Vert is a station with a standard configuration. It has two platforms separated by the metro tracks located in the centre and the vault is elliptical. The decoration is in the style used for most metro stations. The lighting strips are white and rounded in the Gaudin style of the metro revival of the 2000s, and the bevelled white ceramic tiles cover the walls, the vault and the tunnel exits. The advertising frames are made of earthenware with brown plant motifs (a shade that did not originally exist) and the name of the station is also made of earthenware in the interwar style of the original CMP. The platforms are equipped with wooden slatted benches painted purple.

It is one of the few stations in the network whose ceramic decoration in the "CMP" style is no longer original, having been completely reconstructed during the 2006 renovation.

=== Bus connections ===
The station is served by lines 29, 69 and 91 of the RATP Bus Network and, at night, by lines N01 and N02 of the Noctilien network.

== Gallery ==
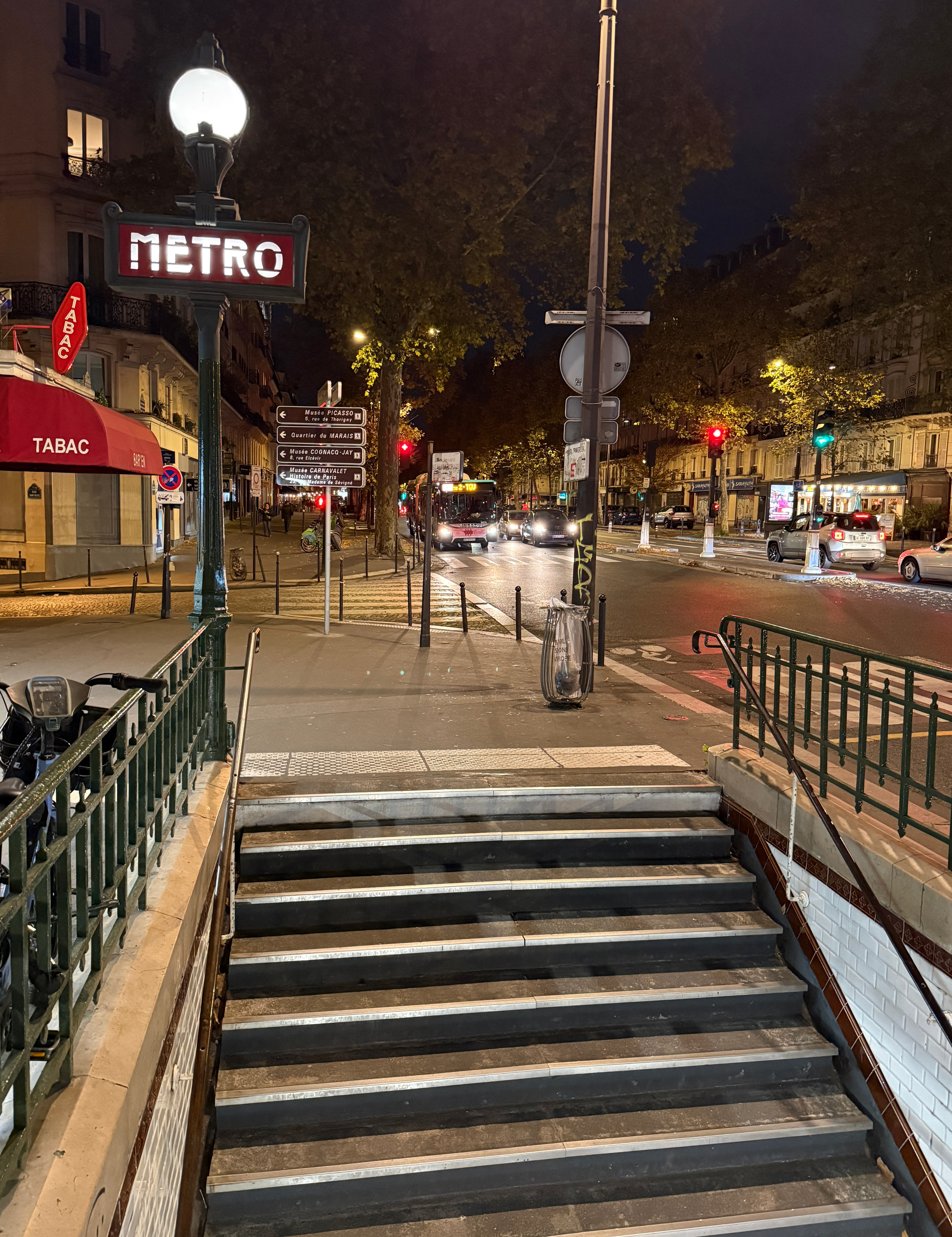

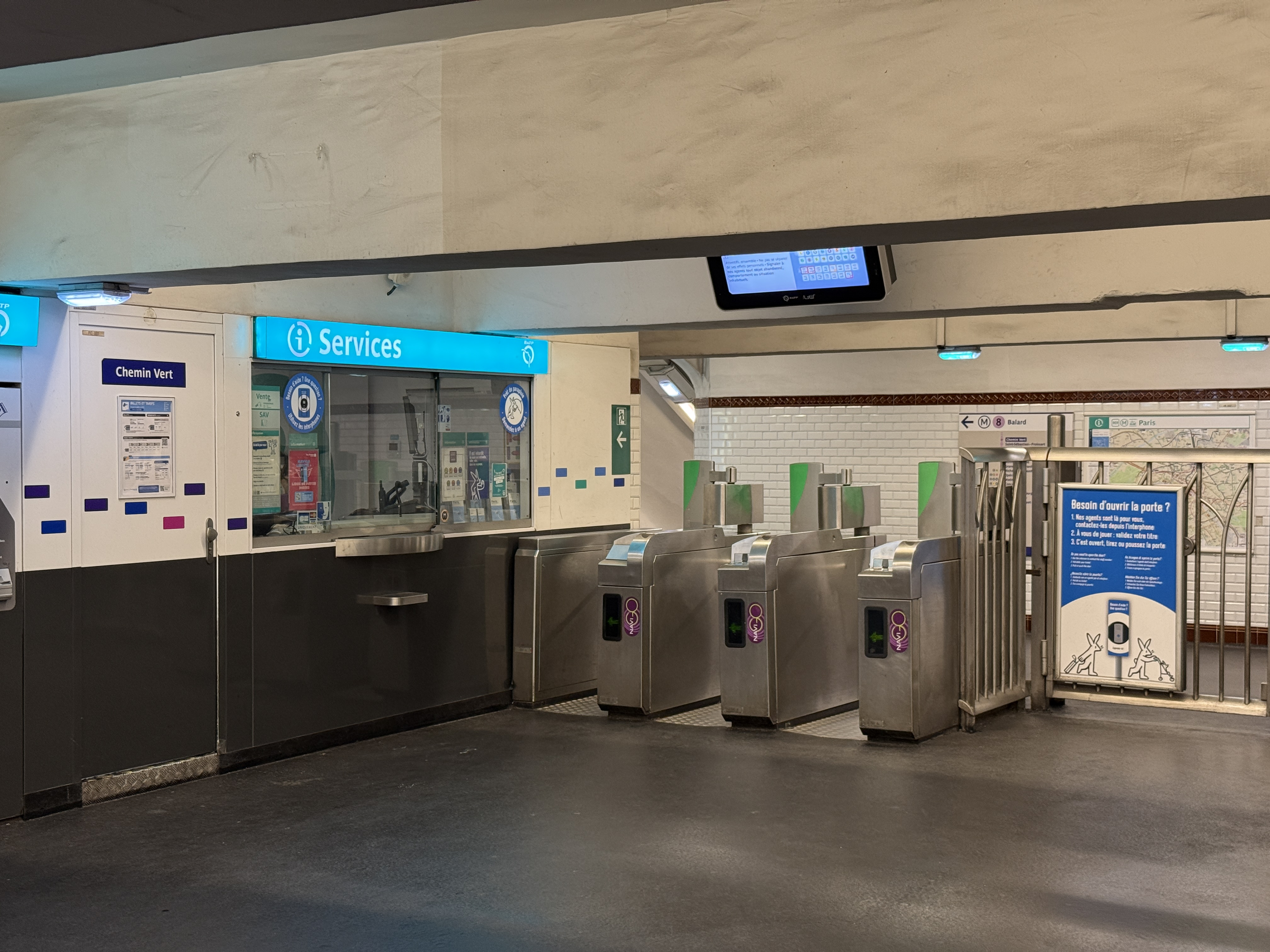

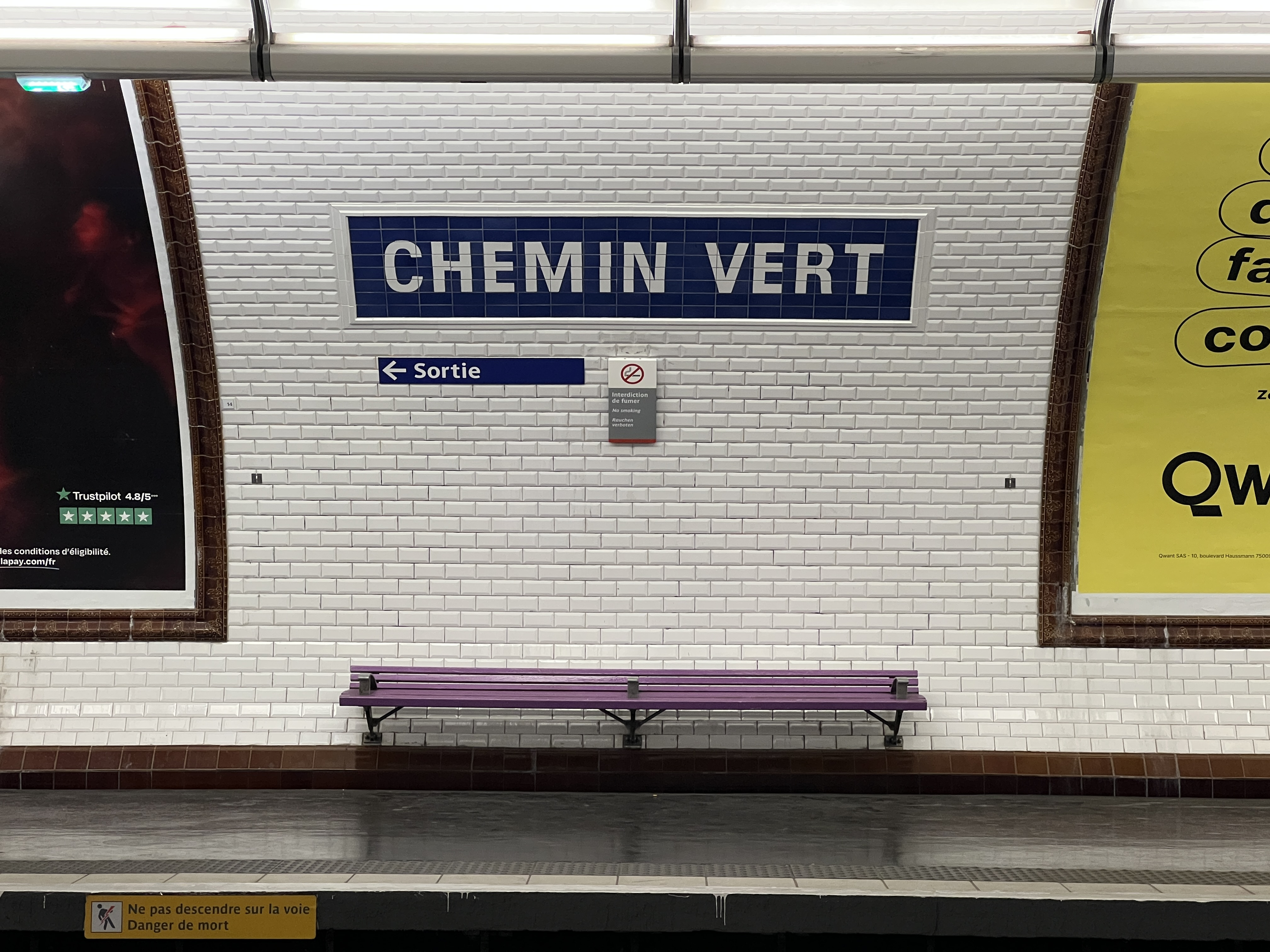

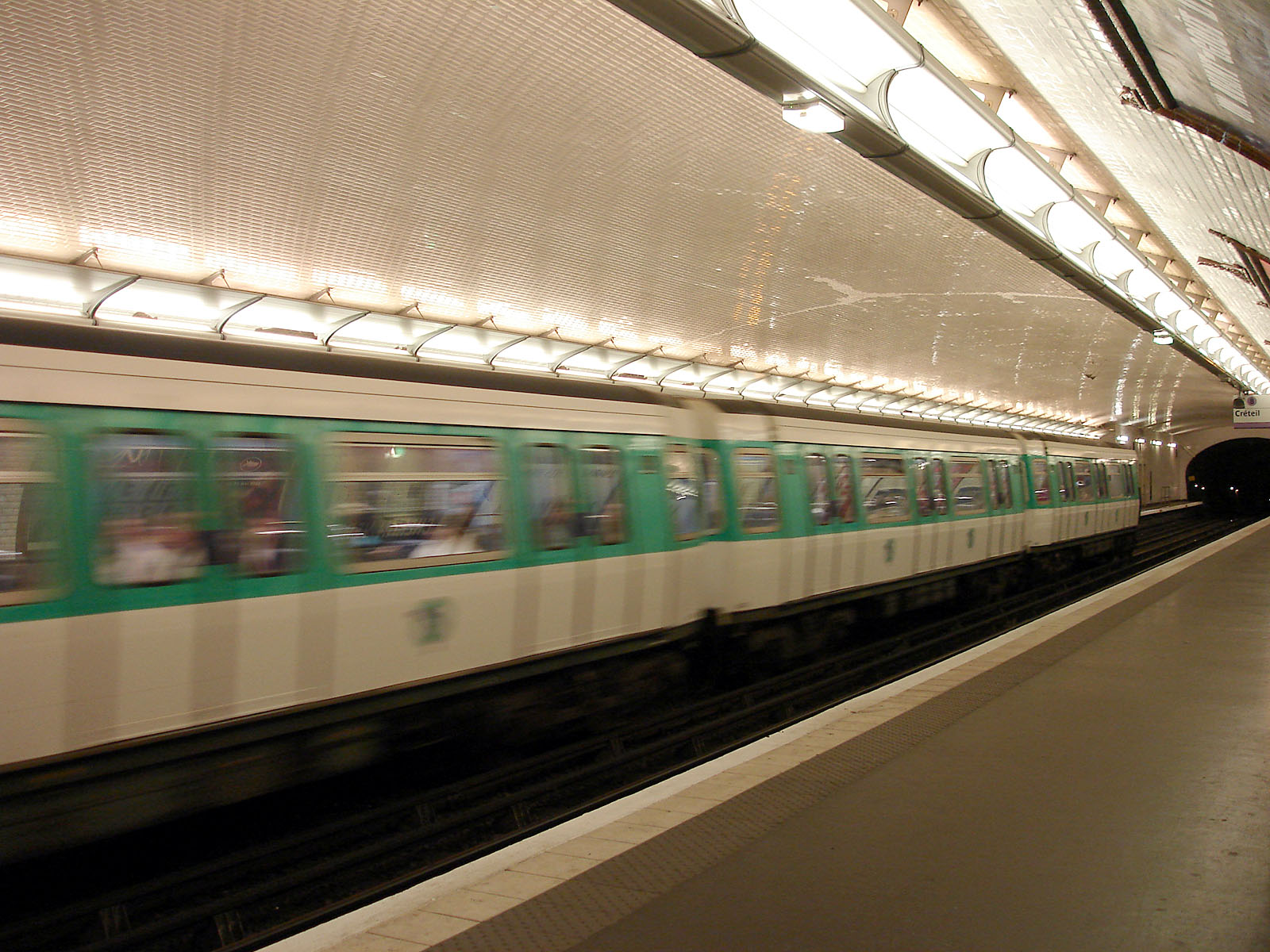

== Nearby ==
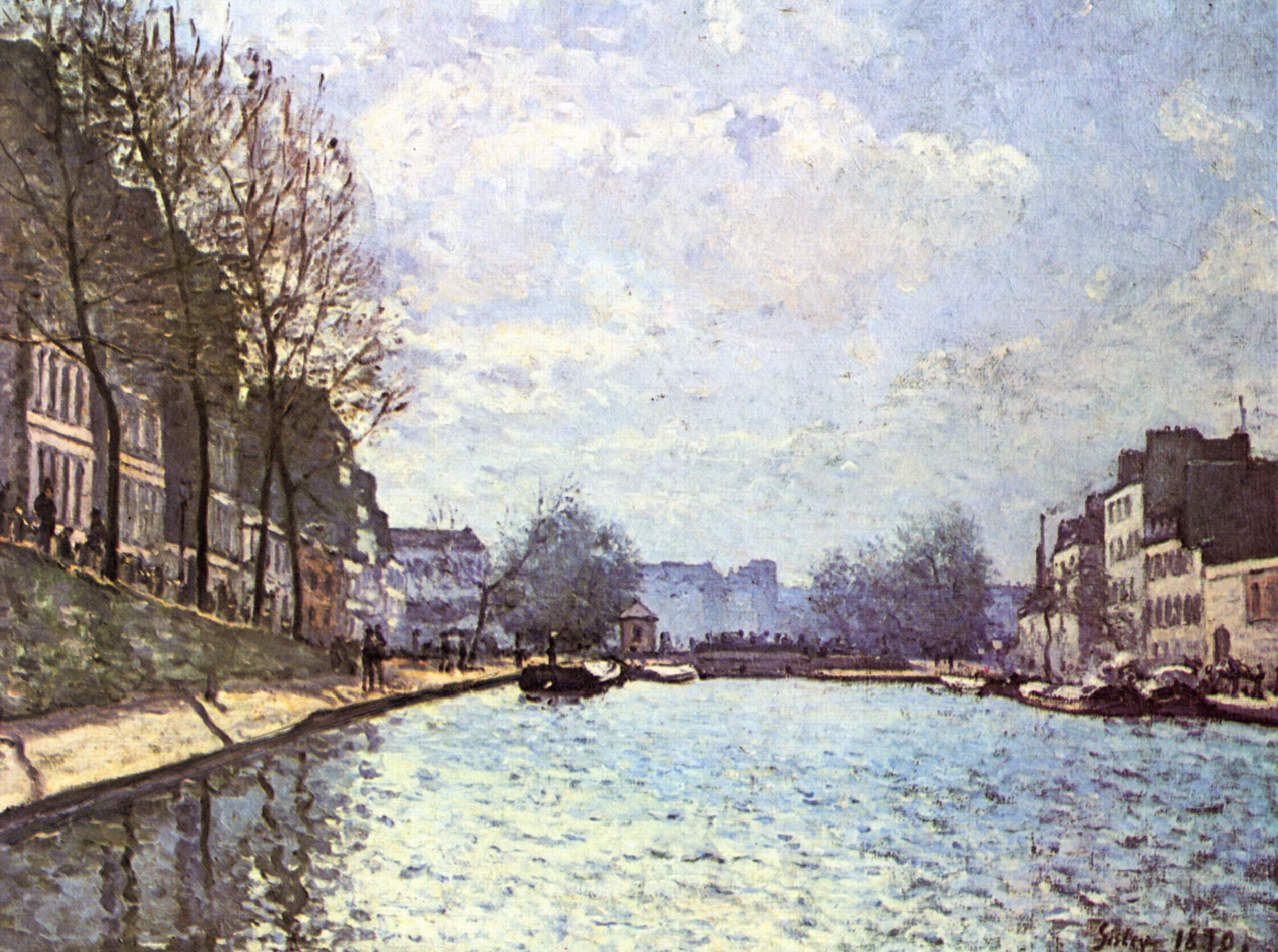
View of the Canal Saint-Martin at Paris (Alfred Sisley, 1870), Musée d'Orsay

- Canal Saint-Martin
- Synagogue des Tournelles
- Place des Vosges (also accessible at Saint-Paul station) with Square Louis-XIII in its centre; the Maison de Victor Hugo at its southeast end; and L'Ambroisie at number 9
- Jardin Arnaud-Beltrame

== Sources ==
- Roland, Gérard (2003). Stations de métro. D'Abbesses à Wagram. Éditions Bonneton.
