= The Condemned of Altona =

- Cover of the English edition, depicting the black window of Franz's crabs.
- Original language: French, Translated from the French by Sylvia and George Leeson
- Written by: Jean-Paul Sartre
- Characters: Major, the von Gerlachs: Father; Franz; Johanna; Leni; Werner; Minor, in flashbacks: Klages; Heinrich a Woman an SS Officer
- Setting: Home of the von Gerlachs, in the Altona borough of Hamburg, Germany.

Premiere
- Date: 1959
- Place: Théâtre de la Renaissance, Paris

The Condemned of Altona (French: Les Séquestrés d'Altona) is a play written by Jean-Paul Sartre, known in Great Britain as Loser Wins. It was first produced in 1959 at the Théâtre de la Renaissance in Paris. It was one of the last plays Sartre wrote, followed only by his adaptation of Euripides' The Trojan Women. The English-language title recalls his formulation "Man is condemned to be free." It is the only one of Sartre's fictional works which deals directly with Nazism, and also serves as a critique of the then-ongoing Algerian War. The action takes place in Altona, a borough of the German city-state of Hamburg.

== Synopsis ==
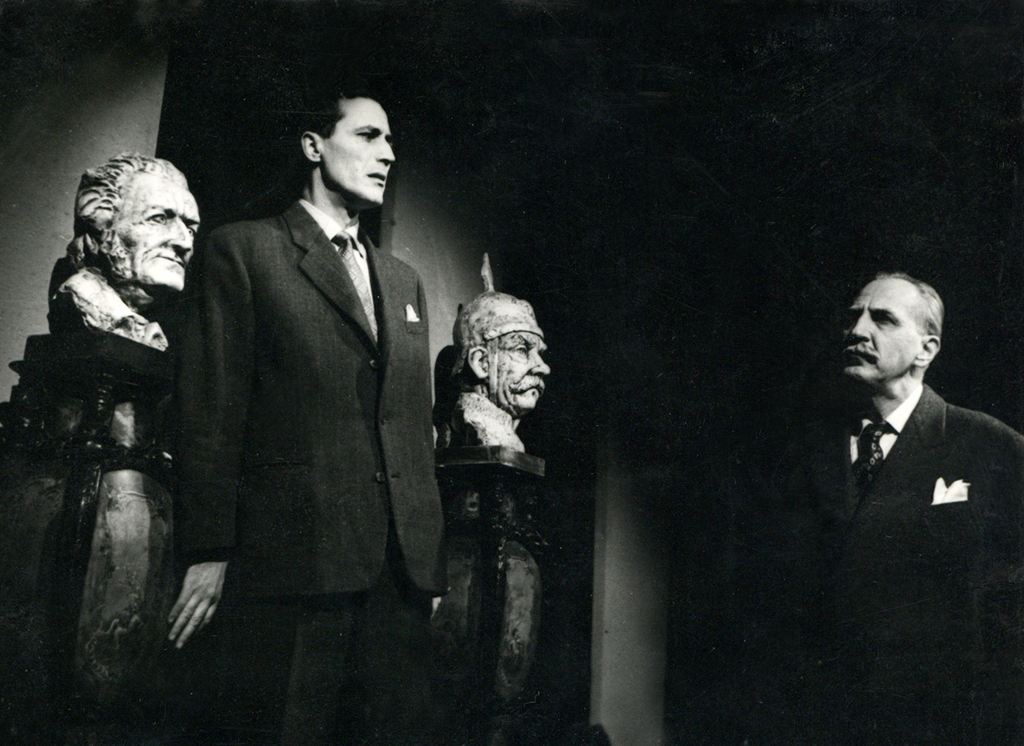
The play by the Ljubljana City Theatre in 1960

Sartre summarizes the plot in the program notes of the play: "A family of big German industrialists, the von Gerlachs, live near Hamburg in an ugly old mansion in the middle of a park. When the curtain rises, the father, who has only six months to live, calls together his daughter Leni, his younger son Werner, and Werner's wife Johanna, in order to inform them of his last wishes. Johanna guesses that, after the father's death, her husband will be sacrificed, as always, to Franz, the elder son. The latter, who has been officially reported dead, has locked himself up, since his return from the front, and refuses to see anyone except his younger sister Leni. In order to save Werner, Johanna determines to investigate the mystery of Franz's seclusion. In doing so, she unwittingly serves her father-in-law's ends. Old von Gerlach makes use of her in order to obtain the interview with Franz which the latter has refused him for thirteen years..."

=== Act One ===
The play opens in a large sitting-room with Leni, Werner, and Johanna awaiting Father von Gerlach, who has summoned a family meeting. Father arrives and requests that the three take an oath: to remain confined to the house while Werner takes over the family business. Leni swears to obey her father's last wishes, but admits that she does not hold to her oaths. Johanna refuses to be bound to her father-in-law's wishes, and confronts the family's secret: that Franz, the elder son, still lives, and that he has been hidden within the house. She claims that Father merely wants to sacrifice her life and Werner's to Franz's protection as she claims Father has done. When she suggests that the family is perhaps his jailer and well as his prisoner, Leni angrily gives Johanna the key to Franz's room. Johanna goes to the room and knocks, but receives no answer. The use of the key reveals that the door is bolted from the inside. Leni asks whether he is being kept prisoner, and Johanna responds: "There are many ways of holding a man prisoner. The best is to get him to imprison himself... by lying to him."

The three continue discussing Franz and his motives. Meanwhile, flashbacks are shown involving Franz. The flashbacks reveal Franz's opposition to the Nazis and relate the encounters which forced him to enlist and later to seal himself up. In the first, about seventeen years ago, Franz shelters a rabbi in his room from the Nazis. When he is discovered, Father appeals to Goebbels, who grants Franz amnesty in return for enlistment. The second takes place four years later, after Franz's return from the front and during the Allied occupation of Germany. Leni provokes an American officer, who attacks and attempts to rape her. Franz comes to her protection, and in the struggle Leni strikes the officer with a glass bottle. Franz takes the blame for the incident and is made to be deported. The day before he is to leave, he locks himself in his room. Some time later Father sends Gelber, a family servant, to obtain a forged death certificate.

Finally, Werner stands and swears to obey his father's last wishes. Johanna tells Werner that she will leave, who replies he will stay without if necessary, and they both exit. Leni tells her father that she has not told Franz of his condition. He admits he wants Leni to convince Franz to see him before his death so that he can settle his account with him, saying "After all, I have lived this life; I don't want it to be wasted," She asks her father why he does not simply give Franz her knocking-signal and see Franz himself, to which he replies "I couldn't bear it if he drove me away." The father exits, and Leni knocks on Franz's door, which he opens. Johanna is caught spying by the father. He convinces her to attempt to see Franz herself and asks her to tell Franz that he is going to die, but specifically tells her not to ask Franz to see him. He tells her to see Franz the very next day, saying "It is our only chance - yours, his, and mine."

=== Act Two ===
The second act takes place in Franz's room, where Leni cleans while waiting for Franz to finish recording a speech to his "Crabs". The room contains only a desk, a chair, and a bed in terrible shape. The walls are covered in placards with phrases written on them, and a large portrait of Hitler. Franz tells Leni about his crabs - individuals of the early thirtieth century who, he claims, will be able to see every single minute of history through a "black window". He claims to be the defendant for the twentieth century against the judgment of the thirtieth.

Leni tells him that the rest of the family is contriving against him, and that Johanna will come to see him. When she suggests that the door-signal be changed, he refuses, justifying his position by claiming that history is sacred. It is revealed that Leni does in fact lie to Franz, telling him Germany has been left in ruins, and that the two of them occasionally sleep together. He claims that it is not incest, and that he has not desired her. Leni calls him a coward, afraid of words. She repeatedly criticizes how he looks to his crab-witnesses for their judgment of him. Seeming to speak of the crabs, she tells Franz "they'll kill you if you don't defend yourself." In his anger, he sends Leni away and tell her he won't let her in should she bring him dinner in the evening. She exits as Franz begins another internal dialogue with his crabs. A flashback is shown where Franz regrets ordering the death of two partisans. He repeats Leni's refrain: "I do what I like, and I like what I do!", taking responsibility for their death. He then regrets sending Leni away, and when he hears the signal at the door he readily opens it, surprised to find not Leni, but Johanna.

Johanna tells Franz that he is tyrannizing them. Franz tells her he does not want their service, but Johanna protests that words alone could not free them. When he asks what will, she answers it would be best if he "did away with himself", yet she asks him to "come back to life" - to come out of his seclusion and take over the business so that she and Werner would be free. When he refuses, she accuses him of being a coward. He protests that he will not be judged by her and tells her that he does not have a choice on his position, adding "I would not submit myself to it unless it was vitally necessary." He says that he does not want to watch the "murder of Germany" which Leni tells him is happening, and that he will be the one voice to cry "No! Not guilty!" to what is imposed on the German people. As Johanna is about to tell Franz something, Leni taps her signal on the door.

Franz tells Johanna to hide in the bathroom, and Leni is let in with Franz's dinner. Leni apologizes for the earlier quarrel, but Franz rushes her quickly out of the room. He tells his crabs: "Don't be taken in, comrades, Leni cannot lie. (Pointing to the bathroom) The liar is in there. ... Don't worry, I know more than one trick. This evening you will see the downfall of a false witness." He notices his hands are trembling, and contains them only at great effort. A change comes over him: "For the first time since the beginning of the scene, he is fully master of himself." He lets Johanna back into the room. Johanna heads for the door, but Franz tells her to wait, as Leni is still just outside. He tells Johanna that she is, like him, a recluse. He makes Johanna realize that he can do something for her that she feels nobody else can do anymore - to make her feel beautiful. When he does this, he convinces her to agree to continue visiting him. He demands that she tell him Germany really is crumbling as Leni says, and she exits.

=== Act Three ===
Father catches Leni spying on him as he enters Werner's office. He has just returned from a six-day trip to Leipzig and is waiting for Werner to return from the shipyard. He shuffles Leni out of the room after a few of her questions, and then calls on Johanna. She tells him that she has gone to see Franz every day, and she tells him that telling Franz the truth about Germany's situation would drive him to suicide. When Johanna says that she will leave, Father asks her to go and see Franz one last time and tell him that his father requests an interview. If Franz accepts, Father says he will release Werner from his oath, saving both Werner and Johanna. Johanna refuses, saying that she would not take her freedom at the cost of Franz's death. Werner arrives, and Father leaves, telling Johanna that his proposition still stands. Johanna tells Werner that she has seen Franz, and tells him Father's proposition. She says that Franz would give Father his interview.

Werner begins drinking and criticizing Johanna's and Father's motives. He asks Johanna if she has been sleeping with Franz. She says no, and Werner asks

Werner: Then what are you afraid of?
Johanna (still icy): Before I knew you, death and madness fascinated me. It's beginning all over again up there, and I don't want it to. (Pause.) I believe in his crabs more than he does.
Werner: Because you love him.
Johanna: Because they're true. Madmen often speak the truth, Werner.
Werner: Really? Which truth?
Johanna: There's only one: the horror of living. (Recovering her warmth) I can't stand it! I can't stand it! I prefer to lie to myself. If you love me, save me. (Pointing to the ceiling) That lid is crushing me. Take me to some town where everyone is the same, where they all lie to themselves. With a wind, a wind that comes from afar. We shall find each other again, Werner, I swear it.
Werner (with a sudden and savage violence): Find each other again? Ha! And how could I have lost you, Johanna? I have never had you. But enough of that! I didn't need your sympathy. You cheated me on the deal. I wanted a wife, and I've only possessed her corpse. I don't care if you do go mad; we shall stay here. (He mimics her.) "Defend me! Save me!" How? By clearing out? (He controls himself and smiles coldly and maliciously.) I was carried away just now. Forgive me. You will do your best to be a good wife; that's your part in life. But the pleasure will be all yours. (Pause.) How far would we have to go for you to forget my brother? How far would we have to run? Trains, ships, planes; what a business, and how dreary! You'll look at everything with those empty eyes - the tragic woman - and that won't be much of a change for you. As for me, have you considered what I shall be thinking all that time? That I gave up from the start, and that I ran away without raising a finger. A coward, eh? A coward. That's what you would like me to be, and then you could comfort me. Maternally. (Violently) We'll stay here! Until one of the three of us dies - you, my brother, or me.
Johanna: How you hate me!
Werner: I shall love you when I have won you. And I'm going to fight, don't worry. (He laughs.) I shall win. You only like strength, you women. And I'm the one who has strength. (He takes her by the waist and kisses her brutally. She strikes him with her clenched fists, releases herself, and bursts into laughter.)

— The Condemned of Altona, pp. 115-116

Johanna tells Werner that he is only trying to act tough, and says that if they stay, she will see Franz every day. Werner replies: "And you'll spend every night in my bed. (He laughs.) It'll be easy to make the comparison." She exits, telling Werner that she is leaving to make the comparison.

=== Act Four ===
The fourth act is in Franz's room. The placards on the walls have been removed, leaving only the portrait of Hitler. The oyster shells have been cleaned from the floor, and Franz appears to be having trouble communicating with his crabs. Johanna arrives and tells him that Father wants to see him. Franz reveals that he knows Johanna is lying to him about Germany. Franz is slowly receding from his solitude - he again keeps track of the time, and is facing the fact of the state of Germany. They discuss the possibility of Johanna sealing herself up as well. Another flashback is shown which takes place in a ruined village on his return from the front. He finds a woman who has lost her legs, who tells him that every German is responsible for Germany's loss. Franz admits that he holds all the guilt of Germany's loss: "He who does not do all, does nothing", in accordance with the woman's statement that "God won't judge you by your deeds, but by what you haven't dared to do - by the crimes that should have been committed and that you didn't commit." Johanna tells him that she acquits him and that she loves him, but Franz says her acquittal must be debated. Leni knocks on the door, and Franz continues:

Franz: Well, it was a little late... to acquit me. (Pause.) Father has talked. (Pause.) Johanna, you're going to witness an execution.
Johanna (looking at him): Yours? And will you allow yourself to be butchered? (Pause.) You don't love me, then?
Franz (laughing silently): I'll talk to you about our love in a moment .. (Pointing to the door) .. in front of her. It won't be nice. And remember this: I'll ask for your help, and you won't give it to me. (Pause.) If there's any chance left .. Go in there!

— p. 149

He hides Johanna in the bathroom once again as he admits Leni, who has brought a slice of cake for his birthday and a newspaper. Leni notices lipstick on a champagne glass and reveals that Father has told her Franz has been seeing Johanna. Leni displays a defensiveness, a jealousy of Johanna, claiming that Franz owes her everything. Franz prods Leni to shoot him, but she refuses, telling Franz that she will tell Johanna everything in order to hurt him by shattering Johanna's love for him, and that she is the only one who loves him for who he is. Franz admits there is a one-in-a-hundred chance that Johanna will accept him, adding: "Yesterday I would have committed murder. Today I see a gleam of hope. If you're still alive, Leni, it's because I've decided to play this chance to the end", and returns the revolver to the drawer. Leni gives Franz the newspaper, a copy of the Frankfurter Zeitung with an article on the Gerlachs, then goes to the bathroom door and tells Johanna to come out. Franz tells Johanna that the time has come to make true on her promise that she would believe only his words, and that their love depends completely on that. He returns to the newspaper, which proves that Germany is truly alive and well. Leni begins to talk about the two prisoners Franz allowed Heinrich to kill, and Johanna comes to the realization that Franz had many people tortured and killed. Johanna tells Leni that she can keep Franz to herself. Franz orders them both out, and when Leni goes towards the drawer which holds the revolver, he yells: "Ten past five! Tell father I'll meet him at six o'clock in the conference room. Get out!"

=== Act Five ===
The final act begins in the large room where the first act took place. It is six o'clock. Franz and Father enter simultaneously. Franz descends the steps slowly as they begin to speak. Franz says that they are both criminals, and that he does not accept Father's ability to judge him, but nonetheless forces him to swear that he will not. He also admits to being a torturer, that he beat the two prisoners to death in trying to make them talk. Franz describes how the powerlessness he felt as the rabbi was beaten to death led him to take full hold of his power later on. He admits "I pretended that I was locking myself up so that I shouldn't witness Germany's agony. It's a lie. I wanted my country to die, and I shut myself up so that I shouldn't be a witness to its resurrection." He releases his father from his oath and says that, without there being a God, any man is a person's natural judge. Father admits that he does not accept Franz, but continues:

Father: I have no contempt for you.
Franz (sarcastically): Really? After what I've told you?
Father: You've told me nothing
Franz (stunned): What do you mean?
Father: I've known about your Smolensk business for three years.

— pp. 166-167

Father reveals that two men of Franz's unit had been taken prisoner by the Russians and survived. They came to see him in 1956, and told Father about the "butcher of Smolensk". It was from then on that Father had wanted to see Franz, whom he pitied. When they begin to talk about the suffering Franz has created for everyone, Franz climbs back up the stairs and threatens to return to his room. His father tells him that he can no longer hide from Germany's fate. He claims that Germany's loss in the war led to its coming back as a world power, and that those, like Franz, who "loved their country enough to sacrifice their military honor for victory" merely "risked prolonging the massacre and hindering its reconstruction." Father apologizes for trying to mold Franz's life according to his own, admitting that he condemned him to impotence and crime. He tells Franz to "Tell your Court of Crabs that I alone am guilty - of everything." Upon hearing this, Franz again descends the stairs, smiling and saying

Franz: That's what I wanted to hear you say. Well, I accept.
Father: What?
Franz: What you expect of me. (Pause.) On one condition: that it is both of us, and at once.
Father (taken aback): At once?
Franz: Yes.
Father (huskily): Do you mean today?
Franz: I mean this very moment. (Pause.) Isn't that what you wanted?
Father (coughs): Not... so soon.
Franz: Why not?
Father: I have just found you again.
Franz: You have found no one. Not even yourself. (He is calm and straightforward for the first time, but completely despairing.) I shall only have been one of your images. The others have remained in your head. As luck would have it, this is the one that became incarnate. In Smolensk one night it had... what? A moment of independence. So you are guilty of everything except that. (Pause.) I lived for thirteen years with a loaded revolver in my drawer. Do you know why I didn't kill myself? I said to myself: "What's done is done."

— p. 173

The two discuss taking Leni's Porsche on the Elbe Embankment, a road which leads to the Teufelsbrücke over the Elbe, something they used to do when Franz was young. Father goes to get the car as Franz gives Leni and Johanna his farewells. Leni asks which car and road they are taking, and Franz gives Leni his tape recorder along with his "best recording" - "the case for the defense". Franz exits, and Leni, who realizes their intent, tells Johanna "[In seven minutes] my Porsche will be in the water... because the Teufelsbrücke is seven minutes from here." Leni says that she will seclude herself in Franz's room, and that she will see only their servant, Hilda. When the seventh minute is reached, she presses the button of the tape recorder, then ascends the stairs and enters the room as it begins to play.

Voice of Franz (from the tape recorder): Centuries of the future, here is my century, solitary and deformed - the accused. My client is tearing himself open with his own hands. What you take for white lymph is blood. There are no red corpuscles, for the accused is dying of hunger. But I will tell you the secret of these multiple incisions. The century might have been a good one had not man been watched from time immemorial by the cruel enemy who had sworn to destroy him, that hairless, evil, flesh-eating beast - man himself. One and one make one - there's our mystery. The beast was hiding, and suddenly we surprised his look deep in the eyes of our neighbors. So we struck. Legitimate self-defense. I surprised the beast. I struck. A man fell, and in his dying eyes I saw the beast still living - myself. One and one make one - what a misunderstanding! Where does it come from, this rancid, dead taste in my mouth? From man? From the beast? From myself? It is the taste of the century. Happy centuries, you who do not know our hatreds, how could you understand the atrocious power of out fatal loves? Love. Hatred. One and one... Acquit us! My client was the first to know shame. he knows he is naked. Beautiful children, you who are born of us, our pain has brought you forth. This century is a woman in labor. Will you condemn your mother? Eh? Answer! (Pause.) The thirtieth century no longer replies. Perhaps there will be no more centuries after ours. Perhaps a bomb will blow out all the lights. Everything will be dead - eyes, judges, time. Night. Oh, tribunal of the night - you who were, who will be, and who are - I have been! I have been! I, Franz von Gerlach, here in this room, have taken the century upon my shoulders and have said: "I will answer for it. This day and forever." What do you say? (Leni has entered Franz's room. Werner appears at the door of the house. Johanna sees him and goes toward him. Their faces are expressionless. They go out without speaking. From Franz's words: "Eh? Answer!? the stage is empty.)

— pp. 177-178

== Illustrations of Sartre's philosophy ==
Throughout the play, Sartre characteristically colors the text of the plot with his philosophic concepts, especially the notions of responsibility and freedom and the contrast between bad faith and authenticity. Some of these comments serve a functional or descriptive role in the plot while simultaneously carrying a philosophic aside. Others are closer to the typical philosophic dialogue, elaborating the characters as they address an issue.

In Act One, Father and Werner discuss the power to command others.

Werner: When I look a man in the eyes I become incapable of giving him orders... I feel that he is my equal.
Father: To obey and to command is the same thing. In both cases you transmit orders you have received.
Werner: You receive orders?
Father: Up to quite recently, I did.
Werner: From whom?
Father: I don't know. Myself, perhaps. (Smiling.. I'll give you the formula. If you want to command, think of yourself as someone else...
Werner: I'm lucky, in fact. [Gelber] will give the orders.
Father: Gelber? You're mad! He is your employee. You pay him to let you know what orders to give.

— pp. 10-11

Here Sartre shows Father's power to stem from a self-deception Werner does not possess: Father claims his ability to command comes from his receiving of orders, despite the fact they are his own. Yet he opposes Werner's proposition, despite its being practically and essentially the same thing: he employs Gelber to employ himself. Similar examples occur in Being and Nothingness, where Sartre shows two groups to be in bad faith for different reasons. The choice of the name Gelber here is a possible pun: Gelb is German for the color "yellow", which in English can also mean "cowardly".

Also in Act One, Sartre's ideas of freedom and "existence precedes essence" are illustrated in Johanna's outburst to Father von Gerlach: "... I declare that I will not make any confessions for the simple reason that I have none to make. I am alone, with out strength and completely aware of my powerlessness."

In the second act, Leni asks Franz why he has not conceded to the crabs every right but the right to condemn him. He claims his exemption as a witness for the defense. Leni objects: "Challenge their competence, I beg you; it's your only weakness. Tell them "You are not my judges,: and you'll have no one to fear - either in this world or the next." Leni later addresses the crabs directly: "...you will condemn us outright, but I couldn't care less." "...I forbid [Franz] to plead my cause. I have only one judge - myself - and I acquit myself. Oh, witness for the defense, testify before yourself. You will be invulnerable if you dare to state: "I have done what I wanted, and I want what I have done."

Later, Franz describes Johanna's beauty as a nothingness to his crabs:

"What calm! She is quiet. It's all there, comrades: "Be beautiful and keep quiet!" A vision. Is it inscribed on your window? Oh, no! What could be inscribed on it? Nothing has changed; nothing has happened. The trick brought nothing into the room, that's all. Emptiness, a diamond that cuts no glass, an absence, beauty. You'll see nothing but the blaze there, poor Crustaceans. You took our eyes to examine what exists, while we, living in man's epoch, have seen with those same eyes what does not exist."

— p. 78

Franz's words imply that the crabs cannot see a nothingness, a term Sartre uses to describe value- and structure-/role- judgments which are not inherent to an object's being, but rather given to them by consciousness.

Another conversation depicts Sartre's "Man is a useless passion": "Franz (ironic admiration): [A] Star! And you didn't succeed? What did you want?" Johanna: "What does one want? Everything." F (slowly): "Everything, yes. Nothing else. All or nothing." (Laughing) "Turned out badly, eh?" J: "Always does."

Sartre considers the possibility that the German soldiers themselves were guilty of enabling Nazi war crimes: "[Klages, a German lieutenant] was the champion of mental reservation. He condemned the Nazis in spirit to hide the fact that he was serving them in the flesh... He said to God: "I don't like what I'm doing." But he did it." This motif of universal responsibility is repeated by Franz and other characters in different forms throughout the play, notably by the dying woman in the flashback of Act Four.
