= Letter on Humanism =

Letter by Martin Heidegger

"Letter on Humanism" (German: Über den Humanismus) refers to a famous letter written by Martin Heidegger in December 1946 in response to a series of questions by Jean Beaufret (10 November 1946) about the development of French existentialism. Heidegger reworked the letter for publication in 1947. He distanced himself from Sartre's position and existentialism in general in this letter.

== Content ==
Heidegger responds to Sartre's famous address, Existentialism is a Humanism, employing modes of being in an attempt to ground his concept of freedom ontologically by distinguishing between being-in-itself and being-for-itself. Sartre's existentialism is criticized in the letter:

Existentialism says existence precedes essence. In this statement he is taking existentia and essentia according to their metaphysical meaning, which, from Plato's time on, has said that essentia precedes existentia. Sartre reverses this statement. But the reversal of a metaphysical statement remains a metaphysical statement. With it, he stays with metaphysics, in oblivion of the truth of Being.

== See also ==
- Antihumanism
- Existential humanism
