= Meaning (existential) =

Description of the significance of life

Meaning in existentialism concerns how people make sense of and give meaning to their existence. Existentialists conceive of the self not as a substance or thing with a pre-given nature, or "essence", but as a situated activity or way of being in which people are always in the process of making or creating who they are. They examine how people "struggle to make sense of and give meaning to" their existence. This view is expressed in the phrase "existence precedes essence", which Kevin Aho calls "arguably the unifying principle of existentialism". In the philosophical literature on the meaning of life, subjectivism is one of the major approaches to the question of what makes a person's life meaningful. Subjectivist theories hold, broadly, that meaning is grounded in what people find meaningful or what they want out of their lives, although such theories have been challenged by arguments for objective and hybrid accounts of meaning.

Thinkers associated with existentialism disagree about the source of meaning. Søren Kierkegaard connected meaning with a personal relationship to God and Christian faith. Albert Camus argued that there is no answer to the question of the meaning of existence: the natural world, the universe and human activity do not provide an overarching purpose or meaning. Viktor Frankl, whose work influenced existential approaches to psychotherapy, argued that meaning is something to be discovered through engagement with life and the world rather than simply created within the individual.

== Kierkegaard ==
What I really need is to get clear about what I must do, not what I must know, except insofar as knowledge must precede every act. What matters is to find a purpose, to see what it really is that God wills that I shall do; the crucial thing is to find a truth which is truth for me, to find the idea for which I am willing to live and die. (...) I certainly do not deny that I still accept an imperative of knowledge and that through it men may be influenced, but then it must come alive in me, and this is what I now recognize as the most important of all.

— Søren Kierkegaard

For Kierkegaard, meaning does not equal knowledge, although both are important. Meaning, for Kierkegaard, is a lived experience, a quest to find one's values, beliefs, and purpose in a meaningless world. As a Christian, Kierkegaard finds his meaning in the Word of God, but for those who are not Christian, Kierkegaard wishes them well in their search.

== Sartre ==
"Existence precedes essence" means that humans exist first before they have meaning in life. Meaning is not given, and must be achieved. With objects—say, a knife, for example—there is some creator who conceives of an idea or purpose of an object, and then creates it with the essence of the object already present. The essence of what the knife will be exists before the actual knife itself. Sartre, who was an atheist, believed that if there is no God to have conceived of our essence or nature, then we must come into existence first, and then create our own essence out of interaction with our surroundings and ourselves. With this come serious implications of self-responsibility over who we are and what our lives mean. For this reason, meaning is something without representation or bearing in anything or anyone else. It is something truly unique to each person – separate, independent.

== Frankl ==
Logotherapy is a type of psychological analysis that focuses on a will to meaning as opposed to a Nietzschean/Adlerian doctrine of "will to power" or Freud's "will to pleasure". Frankl also noted the barriers to humanity's quest for meaning in life. He warns against "...affluence, hedonism, [and] materialism..." in the search for meaning.

The following list of tenets represents Frankl's basic principles of Logotherapy:

- Life has meaning under all circumstances, even the most miserable ones.
- Our main motivation for living is our will to find meaning in life.
- We have inalienable freedom to find meaning.

— About Logotherapy

We can find meaning in life in three different ways:

1. by creating a work or doing a deed;
2. by experiencing something or encountering someone;
3. by the attitude we take toward unavoidable suffering.

— About Logotherapy

Logotherapy was developed by psychiatrist and Holocaust survivor Viktor Frankl.

== See also ==
- Man's Search for Meaning – Viktor Frankl's 1946 book
- Meaning (philosophy)
- Social alienation § Meaninglessness
