= Being and Nothingness =

1943 book by Jean-Paul Sartre

- Cover of the first edition
- Author: Jean-Paul Sartre
- Original title: L'Être et le néant
- Translators: Hazel Barnes (1956: 1st English translation); Sarah Richmond (2018: 2nd English translation)
- Language: French
- Subject: Ontology
- Publisher: Éditions Gallimard, Philosophical Library
- Publication date: 1943
- Publication place: France
- English publication date: 1956
- Media type: Print (Hardcover and Paperback)
- Pages: 638 (Routledge edition)
- ISBN: 0-415-04029-9 (Routledge edition)

Being and Nothingness: An Essay on Phenomenological Ontology (French: L'Être et le néant : Essai d'ontologie phénoménologique), sometimes published with the subtitle A Phenomenological Essay on Ontology, is a 1943 book by the philosopher Jean-Paul Sartre. In the book, Sartre develops a philosophical account in support of his existentialism, dealing with topics such as consciousness, perception, social philosophy, self-deception, the existence of "nothingness", psychoanalysis, and the question of free will.

While a prisoner of war in 1940 and 1941, Sartre read Martin Heidegger's Being and Time (1927), which uses the method of Husserlian phenomenology as a lens for examining ontology. Sartre attributed the course of his own philosophical inquiries to his exposure to this work. Though influenced by Heidegger, Sartre was profoundly skeptical of any measure by which humanity could achieve a kind of personal state of fulfillment comparable to the hypothetical Heideggerian "re-encounter with Being". In Sartre's account, man is a creature haunted by a vision of "completion" (what Sartre calls the ens causa sui, meaning literally "a being that causes itself"), which many religions and philosophers identify as God. Born into the material reality of one's body, in a material universe, one finds oneself inserted into being. In accordance with Husserl's notion that consciousness can only exist as consciousness of something, Sartre develops the idea that there can be no form of self that is "hidden" inside consciousness. On these grounds, Sartre goes on to offer a philosophical critique of Sigmund Freud's theories, based on the claim that consciousness is essentially self-conscious.

Being and Nothingness is regarded as both the most important non-fiction expression of Sartre's existentialism and his most influential philosophical work, original despite its debt to Heidegger. Many have praised the book's central notion that "existence precedes essence", its introduction of the concept of bad faith, and its exploration of "nothingness", as well as its novel contributions to the philosophy of sex. However, the book has been criticized for its abstruseness and for its treatment of Freud.

== Background ==
=== Descartes ===
Sartre's existentialism shares its philosophical starting point with René Descartes: The first thing we can be aware of is our existence, even when doubting everything else (Cogito ergo sum). In Nausea, the main character's feeling of dizziness towards his own existence is induced by things, not thinking. This dizziness occurs "in the face of one's freedom and responsibility for giving a meaning to reality". As an important break with Descartes, Sartre rejects the primacy of knowledge (a rejection summed up in the phrase "Existence precedes essence") and offers a different conception of knowledge and consciousness.

=== Husserl ===
Important ideas in Being and Nothingness build on Edmund Husserl's phenomenology. To both philosophers, consciousness is intentional, meaning that there is only consciousness of something. For Sartre, intentionality implies that there is no form of self that is hidden inside consciousness (such as Husserl's transcendental ego). An ego must be a structure outside consciousness, so that there can be consciousness of the ego.

== Summary ==
In the introduction, Sartre sketches his own theory of consciousness, being, and phenomena through criticism of both earlier phenomenologists (most notably Husserl and Heidegger) as well as idealists, rationalists, and empiricists. According to him, one of the major achievements of modern philosophy is phenomenology because it disproved the kinds of dualism that set the existent up as having a "hidden" nature (such as Immanuel Kant's noumenon); Phenomenology has removed "the illusion of worlds behind the scene".

Based on an examination of the nature of phenomena, he describes the nature of two types of being, being-in-itself (the being of things) and being-for-itself. While being-in-itself is something that can only be approximated by human beings, being-for-itself is the being of consciousness.

=== Part 1, Chapter 1: The origin of negation ===
From Sartre's phenomenological point of view, nothingness is an experienced reality and cannot be a merely subjective mistake. The absence of a friend and absence of money hint at a being of nothingness. It is part of reality. In the first chapter, Sartre develops a theory of nothingness which is central to the whole book, especially to his account for bad faith and freedom. For him, nothingness is not just a mental concept that sums up negative judgements such as "Pierre is not here" and "I have no money". Though "it is evident that non-being always appears within the limits of a human expectation", the concrete nothingness differs from mere abstract inexistence, such as the square circle. A concrete nothingness, e.g. not being able to see, is part of a totality: the life of the blind man in this world. This totality is modified by the nothingness which is part of it.

In the totality of consciousness and phenomenon (Heidegger's being-in-the-world), both can be considered separately, but exist only as a whole (intentionality of consciousness). The human attitude of inquiry, of asking questions, puts consciousness at distance from the world. Every question brings up the possibility of a negative answer, of non-being, e.g. "Who is entering? No one." For Sartre, this is how nothingness can exist at all. Non-being can neither be part of the being-in-itself nor can it be as a complement of it. Being-for-itself is the origin of negation. The relation between being-for-itself and being-in-itself is one of questioning the latter. By bringing nothingness into the world, consciousness does not annihilate the being of things, but changes its relation to it.

=== Part 1, Chapter 2: Bad faith ===
As bad faith, Sartre describes one's self-deception about the human reality. It can take two forms, the first one is making oneself falsely believe not to be what one actually is. The second one is conceiving oneself as an object (e.g. being identical to a job) and thereby denying freedom.

This essentially means that in being a waiter, grocer, etc., one must believe that their social role is equivalent to their human existence. Living a life defined by one's occupation, social, racial, or economic class, is the very essence of "bad faith", the condition in which people cannot transcend their situations in order to realize what they must be (human) and what they are not (waiter, grocer, etc.). It is also essential for an existent to understand that negation allows the self to enter what Sartre calls the "great human stream". The great human stream arises from a singular realization that nothingness is a state of mind in which we can become anything, in reference to our situation, that we desire.

The difference between existence and identity projection remains at the heart of human subjects who are swept up by their own condition, their "bad faith". An example of projection that Sartre uses is the café waiter who performs the duties, traditions, functions, and expectations of a café waiter:

[W]hat are we then if we have the constant obligation to make ourselves what we are if our mode of being is having the obligation to be what we are? Let us consider this waiter in the café. His movement is quick and forward, a little too precise, a little too rapid. He bends forward a little too eagerly; his voice, his eyes express an interest a little too solicitous for the order of the customer. Finally there he returns, trying to imitate in his walk the inflexible stiffness of some kind of automaton while carrying his tray with the recklessness of a tight-rope-walker by putting it in a perpetually unstable, perpetually broken equilibrium which he perpetually re-establishes by a light movement of the arm and hand. All his behavior seems to us a game. He applies himself to changing his movements as if they were mechanisms, the one regulating the other; his gestures and even his voice seems to be mechanisms; he gives himself the quickness and pitiless rapidity of things. He is playing, he is amusing himself. But what is he playing? We need not watch long before we can explain it: he is playing at being a waiter in a café. There is nothing there to surprise us.

Sartre also gives, as an example of bad faith, the attitude of the homosexual who denies that he is a homosexual, feeling that "a homosexual is not a homosexual" in the same sense that a table is a table or a red-haired man is red-haired. Sartre argues that such an attitude is partially correct since it is based in the "irreducible character of human reality", but that it would be fully correct only if the homosexual accepted that he is a homosexual in the sense that he has adopted a pattern of conduct defined as that of a homosexual, although not one "to the extent that human reality can not be finally defined by patterns of conduct".

Sartre consistently mentions that in order to get out of bad faith, one must realize that one's existence and one's formal projection of a self are distinctly separate and within the means of human control. This separation is a form of nothingness. Nothingness, in terms of bad faith, is characterized by Sartre as the internal negation which separates pure existence and identity, and thus we are subject to playing our lives out in a similar manner. An example is something that is what it is (existence) and something that is what it is not (a waiter defined by his occupation).

However, Sartre takes a stance against characterizing bad faith in terms of "mere social positions". Says Sartre, "I am never any one of my attitudes, any one of my actions." The good speaker is the one who plays at speaking because he cannot be speaking. This literally means that, like the café waiter, the speaker is not his condition or social categorization, but is a speaker consumed by bad faith. Thus, we must realize what we are (beings who exist) and what we are not (a social/historical preoccupation) in order to step out of bad faith. Yet, existents (human beings) must maintain a balance between existence, their roles, and nothingness to become authentic beings.

Additionally, an important tenet of bad faith is that we must enact a bit of "good faith" in order to take advantage of our role to reach an authentic existence. The authentic domain of bad faith is realizing that the role we are playing is the lie. To live and project into the future as a project of a self, while keeping out of bad faith and living by the will of the self is living life authentically.

One of the most important implications of bad faith is the abolition of traditional ethics. Being a "moral person" requires one to deny authentic impulses (everything that makes us human) and allow the will of another person to change one's actions. Being "a moral person" is one of the most severe forms of bad faith. Sartre essentially characterizes this as "the faith of bad faith" which is and should not be, in Sartre's opinion, at the heart of one's existence. Sartre has a very low opinion of conventional ethics, condemning it as a tool of the bourgeoisie to control the masses.

Bad faith also results when individuals begin to view their life as made up of distinct past events. By viewing one's ego as it once was rather than as it currently is, one ends up negating the current self and replacing it with a past self that no longer exists.

=== Part 3, Chapter 1: The look ===
The mere possible presence of another person causes one to look at oneself as an object and see one's world as it appears to the other. This is not done from a specific location outside oneself, but is non-positional. This is a recognition of the subjectivity in others.

This transformation is most clear when one sees a mannequin that one confuses for a real person for a moment.

- While they believe it is a person, their world is transformed. Objects now partly escape them; they have aspects that belong to the other person, and that are thus unknowable to them. During this time one can no longer have a total subjectivity. The world is now the other person's world, a foreign world that no longer comes from the self, but from the other. The other person is a "threat to the order and arrangement of your whole world...Your world is suddenly haunted by the Other's values, over which you have no control".
- When they realise it is a mannequin, and is not subjective, the world seems to transfer back, and they are again in the center of a universe. This is back to the pre-reflective mode of being, it is "the eye of the camera that is always present but is never seen". The person is occupied and too busy for self-reflection. This process is continual, unavoidable, and ineluctable.

==== Being for Others ====
Sartre states that many relationships are created by people's attraction not to another person, but rather how that person makes them feel about themselves by how they look at them. This is a state of emotional alienation whereby a person avoids experiencing their subjectivity by identifying themselves with "the look" of the other. The consequence is conflict. In order to maintain the person's own being, the person must control the other, but must also control the freedom of the other "as freedom". These relationships are a profound manifestation of "bad faith" as the for-itself is replaced with the other's freedom. The purpose of either participant is not to exist, but to maintain the other participant's looking at them. This system is often mistakenly called "love", but it is, in fact, nothing more than emotional alienation and denial of freedom through conflict with the other. Sartre believes that it is often created as a means of making the unbearable anguish of a person's relationship to their "facticity" (all of the concrete details against the background of which human freedom exists and is limited, such as birthplace and time) bearable. At its extreme, the alienation can become so intense that due to the guilt of being so radically enslaved by "the look" and therefore radically missing their own freedoms, the participants can experience masochistic and sadistic attitudes. This happens when the participants cause pain to each other, in attempting to prove their control over the other's look, which they cannot escape because they believe themselves to be so enslaved to the look that experiencing their own subjectivity would be equally unbearable.

==== Sex ====
Sartre explains that "the look" is the basis for sexual desire, declaring that a biological motivation for sex does not exist. Instead, "double reciprocal incarnation" is a form of mutual awareness which Sartre takes to be at the heart of the sexual experience. This involves the mutual recognition of subjectivity of some sort, as Sartre describes: "I make myself flesh in order to impel the Other to realize for herself and for me her own flesh. My caress causes my flesh to be born for me insofar as it is for the Other flesh causing her to be born as flesh."

Even in sex (perhaps especially in sex), men and women are haunted by a state in which consciousness and bodily being would be in perfect harmony, with desire satisfied. Such a state, however, can never be. We try to bring the beloved's consciousness to the surface of their body by use of magical acts performed, gestures (kisses, desires, etc.), but at the moment of orgasm the illusion is ended and we return to ourselves, just as it is ended when the skier comes to the foot of the mountain or when the commodity that once we desired loses its glow upon our purchase of it. There will be, for Sartre, no such moment of completion because "man is a useless passion" to be the ens causa sui, the God of the ontological proof.

==== Nothingness ====
Sartre contends that human existence is a conundrum whereby each of us exists, for as long as we live, within an overall condition of nothingness (no thing-ness)—that ultimately allows for free consciousness. Yet simultaneously, within our being (in the physical world), we are constrained to make continuous, conscious choices.

It is this dichotomy that causes anguish, because choice (subjectivity) represents a limit on freedom within an otherwise unbridled range of thoughts. Subsequently, humans seek to flee our anguish through action-oriented constructs such as escapes, visualizations, or visions (such as dreams) designed to lead us toward some meaningful end, such as necessity, destiny, determinism (God), etc. Thus, in living our lives, we often become unconscious actors—Bourgeois, Feminist, Worker, Party Member, Frenchman, Canadian or American—each doing as we must to fulfill our chosen characters' destinies.

However, Sartre contends our conscious choices (leading to often unconscious actions) run counter to our intellectual freedom. Yet we are bound to the conditioned and physical world—in which some form of action is always required. This leads to failed dreams of completion, as Sartre described them, because inevitably we are unable to bridge the void between the purity and spontaneity of thought and all-too constraining action; between the being and the nothingness that inherently coincide in our self.

Sartre's recipe for fulfillment is to escape all quests by completing them. This is accomplished by rigorously forcing order onto nothingness, employing the "spirit (or consciousness of mind) of seriousness" and describing the failure to do so in terms such as "bad faith" and "false consciousness". Though Sartre's conclusion seems to be that being diminishes before nothingness since consciousness is probably based more on spontaneity than on stable seriousness, he contends that any person of a serious nature is obliged to continuous struggle between two things:

a) The conscious desire for peaceful self-fulfillment through physical actions and social roles—as if living within a portrait that one actively paints of oneself

b) The more pure and raging spontaneity of no thing consciousness, of being instantaneously free to overturn one's roles, pull up stakes, and strike out on new paths

==== Phenomenological ontology ====
In Sartre's opinion, consciousness does not make sense by itself: it arises only as an awareness of objects. Consciousness is therefore always and essentially consciousness of something, whether this "something" is a thing, a person, an imaginary object, etc. Phenomenologists often refer to this quality of consciousness as "intentionality". Sartre's contribution, then, is that in addition to always being consciousness of something, consciousness is always consciousness of itself. In other words, all consciousness is, by definition, self-consciousness. By "self-consciousness", Sartre does not mean being aware of oneself thought of as an object (e.g., one's "ego"), but rather that, as a phenomenon in the world, consciousness both appears and appears to itself at the same time. By appearing to itself, Sartre argues that consciousness is fully transparent; unlike an ordinary "object" (a house, for instance, of which it is impossible to perceive all of the sides at the same time), consciousness "sees" all aspects of itself at once. This non-positional quality of consciousness is what makes it a unique type of being, a being that exists for itself.

=== Critique of Freud ===
Sartre offers a critique of the psychoanalyst Sigmund Freud's theory of the unconscious, based on the claim that consciousness is essentially self-conscious. Sartre also argues that Freud's theory of repression is internally flawed. According to Sartre, in his clinical work, Freud encountered patients who seemed to embody a particular kind of paradox—they appeared to both know and not know the same thing. In response, Freud postulated the existence of the unconscious, which contains the "truth" of the traumas underlying the patients' behavior. This "truth" is actively repressed, which is made evident by the patients' resistance to its revelation during analysis. Yet what does the resisting if the patients are unaware of what they are repressing? Sartre finds the answer in what Freud calls the "censor". "The only level on which we can locate the refusal of the subject", Sartre writes, "is that of the censor." Further:

[T]he resistance of the patient implies on the level of the censor an awareness of the thing repressed as such, a comprehension of the end toward which the questions of the psychoanalyst are leading . . . These various operations in their turn imply that the censor is conscious itself. But what type of self-consciousness can the censor have? It must be the consciousness being conscious of the drive to be repressed, but precisely in order not to be conscious of it. What does this mean if not that the censor is in bad faith?

In other words, Sartre views Freud's unconscious to be a scapegoat for the paradox of simultaneously knowing and not knowing the same information. Instead of alleviating the paradox, Freud simply moves it to the censor, establishing "between the unconscious and consciousness an autonomous consciousness in bad faith". Sartre thinks that the postulation of a censor within the psychic economy is therefore redundant: at the level of the censor, we still encounter the same problem of a consciousness that hides something from itself. For Sartre, what Freud identifies as repression is rather indicative of the larger structure of bad faith. Psychoanalysis thus does not yield any special insight, since hiding something from oneself occurs at the level of consciousness as a unified phenomenon, not as part of some intra-psychic mechanism.

== Special terminology used by Sartre ==
Explanation of terms based on appendix to the English edition of Being and Nothingness by translator Hazel Barnes:

- Being (être): Including both Being-in-itself and Being-for-itself (both as defined below), but the latter is the nihilation of the former. Being is objective, not subjective or individual.
- Being-in-itself (être-en-soi): Non-conscious Being. The sort of phenomenon that is greater than the knowledge that we have of it.
- Being-for-itself (être-pour-soi): The nihilation of Being-in-itself; consciousness conceived as a lack of Being, a desire for Being, a relation of Being. The For-itself brings Nothingness into the world and therefore can stand out from Being and form attitudes towards other beings by seeing what it is not.
- Being-for-others (être-pour-autrui): Here a new dimension arises in which the self exists as an object for others. Each For-itself seeks to recover its own Being by making an object out of the other.
- Consciousness: The transcending For-itself. Sartre states that "Consciousness is a being such that in its being, its being is in question insofar as this being implies a being other than itself."
- Existence: Concrete, individual being-for-itself here and now.
- Existence precedes essence. The subjective existence of reality precedes and defines its nature. Who you are (your essence) is defined by what you do (your existence).
- Facticity (facticité): Broadly, facts about the world. More precisely, the For-itself's necessary connection with the In-itself, with the world and its own past.
- Freedom: The very being of the For-itself which is "condemned to be free". It must forever choose for itself and therefore make itself.
- Nothingness (néant): Although not having being, it is supported by being. It comes into the world by the For-itself.
- Reflection (reflet): The form in which the For-itself founds its own nothingness through the dyad of "the-reflection-reflecting".
- Reflection (réflexion): The consciousness attempting to become its own object.

== Reception ==
Being and Nothingness is considered Sartre's most important philosophical work, and the most important non-fiction expression of his existentialism. Christian existentialist Gabriel Marcel wrote that it was of "incontestable" importance and ranked among the most important contributions made to general philosophy. While Marcel noted the influence of Heidegger on "the form at least" of Being and Nothingness, he also observed that Sartre diverged from the views expressed by Heidegger in Being and Time (1927) in important ways, and that Sartre's contributions were original. Marcel considered Sartre's analysis of bad faith "one of the most outstanding and solid" parts of Being and Nothingness, writing that it prevented Sartre's arguments from being purely abstract. Marcel saw one of the most important merits of the work to be to show "that a form of metaphysics which denies or refuses grace inevitably ends by setting up in front of us the image of an atrophied and contradictory world where the better part of ourselves is finally unable to recognise itself".

The philosopher Jean Wahl criticized Sartre's arguments about the topic of "nothing". The philosopher Frederick Copleston described Sartre's view that all human actions are the result of free choice as "highly implausible", though he noted that Sartre had ways of defending his position. He also expressed sympathy for Marcel's criticism of Sartre, and described Sartre's view of freedom as both "nihilistic" and possibly inconsistent with some of Sartre's other views. The philosopher A. J. Ayer wrote that, apart from some psychological insights, the book was "a pretentious metaphysical thesis" and "principally an exercise in misusing the verb 'to be'".

The author Susan Sontag praised Sartre's discussions of the body and concrete relations with others. She identified them as part of a French tradition of serious thought about problems of fundamental importance. The literary scholar John B. Vickery wrote that Being and Nothingness resembles Sir James George Frazer's The Golden Bough (1890) in the way its author "merges psychology and the concrete sense of fiction", although he considered it less readable than Frazer's work. The philosopher Iris Murdoch compared Being and Nothingness to Gilbert Ryle's The Concept of Mind (1949). She maintained that continental philosophy shares the same general orientation as English analytic philosophy. According to the philosopher Steven Crowell, Being and Nothingness had come to be seen as outdated by Sartre's death in 1980, since its emphasis on consciousness associated with "the subjectivism and psychologism that structuralism and analytic philosophy had finally laid to rest".

The philosopher David Pears criticized Sartre's critique of Freud, describing it as complex but imprecisely formulated and open to potential objections. The philosopher Thomas Baldwin described Being and Nothingness as a work of pessimism. He wrote that Sartre's argument that Freud's theory of repression is internally flawed is based on a misunderstanding of Freud, and that Sartre's attempts to adapt Freud's ideas are of greater interest. The director Richard Eyre recalled that Being and Nothingness was popular among British students in the 1960s, but suggests that among them the work usually went unread.

Several authors, including the sociologist Murray S, Davis, the philosophers Roger Scruton and Maxine Sheets-Johnstone, and the physician Frank Gonzalez-Crussi, have praised Sartre for his contributions to the philosophy of sex. Davis credited Sartre with being the first author to present a phenomenological analysis of sex. Scruton credited Sartre with providing "perhaps the most acute philosophical analysis" of sexual desire and correctly arguing that treating sexual desire as equivalent to appetite ignores "the interpersonal component of human sexual responses." He described Sartre's reflections on le visqueux as "celebrated". He has also credited Sartre with providing a "stunning apology for sado-masochism", and characterized Being and Nothingness as a "great work of post-Christian theology". Gonzalez-Crussi credited Sartre with recognizing that it is incorrect to equate sexual desire with desire for sexual acts. Sheets-Johnstone believed Sartre presented a subtle analysis of human sexuality. She praised his understanding of desire in general and suggested that his views about the subject anticipated those of the philosopher Michel Foucault. She believed that his views contained both significant truth and internal contradictions. She suggested that despite his criticism of Freud, his views about women and female sexuality were in some ways similar to Freud's. Naomi Greene, arguing that there is a "distaste for sexuality" in Sartre's work, identifies a clear "anti-sexual bias" present in Being and Nothingness.

== See also ==
- Critique of Dialectical Reason
- Existentialism is a Humanism
- Phenomenology of Perception
- Search for a Method
- The Imaginary
