= Existence precedes essence =

Central claim of existentialism formulated by Sartre

The proposition that existence precedes essence (French: l'existence précède l'essence) is a central claim of existentialism, which reverses the traditional philosophical view that the essence (the nature) of a thing is more fundamental and immutable than its existence (the mere fact of its being). To existentialists, human beings—through their consciousness—create their own values and determine a meaning for their life because the human being does not possess any inherent identity or value. That identity or value must be created by the individual. By posing the acts that constitute them, they make their existence more significant.

The idea originates from a speech by F. W. J. Schelling delivered in December 1841. Søren Kierkegaard was present at this occasion and the idea can be found in Kierkegaard's works in the 19th century, but was explicitly formulated by philosopher Jean-Paul Sartre in the 20th century. The three-word formula originated in his 1945 lecture "Existentialism Is a Humanism", though antecedent notions can be found in Heidegger's Being and Time.

As a result, for Sartre, "existence precedes essence" not only defines and determines his own existential thinking or interpretation of existentialism, but also any thinking or philosophising that declares itself to be existential. Despite Sartre's later efforts to distance himself and his thinking from this remark and its consequences, it has become the most quoted, repeated, and cited description of existentialism and any non-theistic existential thought.

== Purpose and freedom ==
The Sartrean claim is best understood in contrast to the scholastic thesis that essence precedes existence; a typical claim for this traditional thesis would be that a human is essentially selfish, or that they are essentially a rational being.

To Sartre, "existence precedes essence" means that a personality is not built from a previously designed model or for a precise purpose, because it is the human being who chooses to engage in such enterprise. While not denying the constraining conditions of human existence, he answers to Spinoza who affirmed that people are determined by what surrounds them. Therefore, to Sartre an oppressive situation is not intolerable in itself, but once regarded as such by those who feel oppressed the situation becomes intolerable. So by projecting my intentions onto my present condition, "It is I who freely transform it into action". When he said that "the world is a mirror of my freedom", he meant that the world obliges me to react, to overtake myself. It is this overtaking of a present constraining situation by a project to come that Sartre names transcendence. He added that "we are condemned to be free".

To claim that existence precedes essence is to assert that there is no such predetermined essence to be found in humans, and that an individual's essence is defined by the individual through how that individual creates and lives their life. As Sartre puts it in his Existentialism is a Humanism: "man first of all exists, encounters himself, surges up in the world – and defines himself afterwards".

== Choice and sedimentation ==
Jonathan Webber interprets Sartre's usage of the term essence not in a modal fashion, i.e. as necessary features, but in a teleological fashion: "An essence is the relational property of having a set of parts ordered in such a way as to collectively perform some activity". For example, it belongs to the essence of a house to keep the bad weather out, which is why it has walls and a roof. Humans are different from houses because unlike houses they don't have an inbuilt purpose: they are free to choose their own purpose and thereby shape their essence, therefore their existence precedes their essence.

Sartre is committed to a radical conception of freedom: nothing fixes our purpose but we ourselves, our projects have no weight or inertia except for our endorsement of them. Simone de Beauvoir, on the other hand, holds that there are various factors, grouped together under the term sedimentation, that offer resistance to attempts to change our direction in life. Sedimentations are themselves products of past choices and can be changed by choosing differently in the present, but such changes happen slowly. They are a force of inertia that shapes the agent's evaluative outlook on the world until the transition is complete.

== Responsibility ==
When it is said that people define themselves, it is often perceived as stating that they can "wish" to be something – anything, a bird, for instance – and then be it. According to Sartre's account, however, this would be a kind of bad faith. What is meant by the statement is that people are (1) defined only insofar as they act and (2) that they are responsible for their actions. To clarify, it can be said that a person who acts cruelly towards other people is, by that act, defined as a cruel person and in that same instance, they (as opposed to their genes, for instance) are defined as being responsible for being this cruel person. Of course, the more positive therapeutic aspect of this is also implied: You can choose to act in a different way, and to be a good person instead of a cruel person. Here it is also clear that since people can choose to be either cruel or good, they are, in fact, neither of these things essentially.

== The Absurd ==
Existentialism tends to focus on the question of human existence and the conditions of this existence. What is meant by existence is the concrete life of each individual, and their concrete ways of being in the world. Even though this concrete individual existence must be the primary source of information in the study of people, certain conditions are commonly held to be "endemic" to human existence. These conditions are usually in some way related to the inherent meaninglessness or absurdity of the universe and its apparent contrast with our pre-reflexive lived lives which normally present themselves to us as meaningful. A central theme is that since the world "in-itself" is absurd, that is, not "fair", then a meaningful life can at any point suddenly lose all its meaning. The reasons why this happens are many, ranging from a tragedy that "tears a person's world apart", to the results of an honest inquiry into one's own existence. Such an encounter can make a person mentally unstable, and avoiding such instability by making people aware of their condition and ready to handle it is one of the central themes of existentialism. Albert Camus, for instance, famously claimed in Le Mythe de Sisyphe that "There is only one truly serious philosophical problem, and that is suicide".

Aside from these "psychological" issues, it is also claimed that these encounters with the absurd are where we are most in touch with our condition as humans. Such an encounter cannot be without philosophical significance, and existentialist philosophers derive many metaphysical theories from these encounters. These are often related to the self, consciousness and freedom as well as the nature of meaning.

== In popular culture ==
Bilal Tanweer used existence precedes essence in his novel The Scatter Here Is Too Great (2013), whose characters are engaged in a quest to discover and shape their essence. They exercise their capacity for free choice and bear responsibility for their actions.

== Criticism ==
Sartre's definition of existentialism was based on Heidegger's magnum opus Being and Time (1927). In the correspondence with Jean Beaufret later published as the Letter on Humanism, Heidegger implied that Sartre misunderstood him for his own purposes of subjectivism, and that he did not mean that actions take precedence over being so long as those actions were not reflected upon. Heidegger commented that "the reversal of a metaphysical statement remains a metaphysical statement", meaning that he thought Sartre had simply switched the roles traditionally attributed to essence and existence without interrogating these concepts and their history.

== See also ==
- Metousiosis
- Sartrean terminology
- Social constructionism
- Tabula rasa
