= Abandonment (existentialism) =

Philosophy of independence from divine oversight

Abandonment, in philosophy, refers to the infinite freedom of humanity without the existence of a condemning or omnipotent higher power. Original existentialism explores the liminal experiences of anxiety, death, "the nothing" and nihilism; the rejection of science (and above all, causal explanation) as an adequate framework for understanding human being; and the introduction of "authenticity" as the norm of self-identity, tied to the project of self-definition through freedom, choice, and commitment. Existential thought bases itself fundamentally in the idea that one's identity is constituted neither by nature nor by culture, since to "exist" is precisely to constitute such an identity. It is from this foundation that one can begin to understand abandonment and forlornness.

== Origin ==
Søren Kierkegaard and Friedrich Nietzsche, the supposed originators of the existentialist school of thought, constrained their theories to theological systems. Both were concerned with the "singularity of existence" and the fact that "existence comes before essence"; but neither of them approach the belief that God never existed and therefore never controlled individual will. The first to do so were Jean-Paul Sartre and Martin Heidegger.

According to Sartre, there are three schools of philosophical thought that influence the freedom of the individual:

1. Christian Belief: The idea that God exists and creates people actively, with a purpose in mind that gives meaning to life. To believers, because men are inherently evil, a life without meaning accorded by a higher power the world will devolve into anarchy.
2. Christian Existentialism: Man creates his identity and gives meaning to his own life. However, he does so in his inimical search for union with God, and thus the struggle to find meaning itself defines the identity of an individual.
3. Atheist Existentialism: The philosophy that there is no “human nature” because there is no creator, no definition of man until he encounters himself. The “human reality” is subjective to the journey of the individual, existence comes before the development of the meaning of that existence.

The absence of God in the conceptualization of life came to be known as “abandonment" because of Sartre's 1946 lecture L'Existentialisme est un humanisme in which he says:

…when we speak of “abandonment” – a favorite word of Heidegger – we only mean to say that God does not exist, and that it is necessary to draw the consequences of his absence right to the end. The existentialist is strongly opposed to a certain type of secular moralism, which seeks to suppress God at the least possible expense.

== Relationship with atheism ==
Abandonment is, in essence, the derivative of atheism. In the Supreme Court case Murray v. Curlett, the case that removed reverential Bible reading and oral unison recitation of the Lord's Prayer in the public schools, the petitioners (atheists, all) defined their beliefs thus:

An atheist loves his fellow man instead of god. An atheist believes that heaven is something for which we should work now – here on earth for all men together to enjoy. An atheist believes that he can get no help through prayer but that he must find in himself the inner conviction and strength to meet life, to grapple with it, to subdue it, and enjoy it...He seeks to know himself and his fellow man rather than to know a god. An atheist believes that a hospital should be built instead of a church. An atheist believes that a deed must be done instead of a prayer said. An atheist strives for involvement in life and not escape into death.

This foundational philosophy is the refrain of all of the most well known atheists: Sartre and Nietzsche, as well as Albert Camus, Michel Foucault, and Noam Chomsky. Ethical behavior, regardless of who the practitioner may be, results always from the same causes and is regulated by the same forces, and has nothing to do with the presence or absence of religious belief. Therefore, belief in a higher power is unnecessary (and for Sartre, unlikely) when one relates to the world under the understanding that humans have no original purpose or meaning to their creation.

== Martin Heidegger ==
Before Sartre defined abandonment as abandonment by, or of the idea of, a higher omnipotent power, philosopher Martin Heidegger wrote about the abandonment of self in much the same way. Deriving his ideas from Nietzsche's work, Heidegger theorized that the abandonment of being is the cause of “the distress of lack of distress,” under the belief that a person's distress is the opening of the mind to the truth of existence, especially the truth that one's existence is meaningless. Therefore, a person's truest state, one in which being comes before meaning, is also one of extreme distress. Heidegger also summarizes this concept as the abandonment of being. He claims it is brought on by the darkness of the world in “modern” times and derangement of the West; the death of the moral (echoing Nietzsche).

The importance of abandonment theory is that it, according to Heidegger, determines an epoch in the historical search for “be-ing.” It is the disownment of the surety of being as less useful than the constant questioning of being, the magnitude of the non-form that reveals the “truth” of life better than transparent and empty platitudes. Heidegger claims that there are three “concealments” of the abandonment of being: calculation, acceleration, and the claim of massiveness.

1. Calculation: Heidegger characterizes this as the machination of technicity, or the belief that one fully understands scientific data and experiments and in so doing places their full faith in those concepts. Heidegger believes that this is a parallel to the belief in God, because there is no longer need for questioning this concept that has become own-most to truth.
2. Acceleration: The mania for what is new or surprising, especially technologically. Heidegger believed that this overpowered the truth and questioning of abandonment because the excitement sweeps one away and gets one caught up in the quantitative enhancement of status of accomplishment, according to both Heidegger and Nietzsche a false moral governing.
3. The outbreak of massiveness: An idea that the rare and unique quality of abandonment, is compromised by the beliefs of the masses, not only in the overwhelming societal numbers of people but in the beliefs and “moral identities” that are common to the many and the all.
