= Existentialism Is a Humanism =

1946 book by Jean-Paul Sartre

- Cover of the first edition
- Author: Jean-Paul Sartre
- Original title: L'existentialisme est un humanisme
- Translators: Philip Mairet; Carol Macomber
- Language: French
- Subject: Existentialism
- Publisher: Les Editions Nagel, Methuen & Co
- Publication date: 1946
- Publication place: France
- English publication date: 1948
- Media type: Print (Hardcover and Paperback)
- Pages: 70 (English edition)
- ISBN: 978-0413313003

Existentialism Is a Humanism (French: L'existentialisme est un humanisme) is a 1946 work by the philosopher Jean-Paul Sartre.

== Summary ==
Sartre asserts that the key defining concept of existentialism is that the existence of a person is prior to their essence or "existence precedes essence".

Thus, Sartre rejects what he calls "deterministic excuses" and claims that people must take responsibility for their behavior. Sartre defines anguish as the emotion that people feel once they realize that they are responsible not just for themselves, but for all humanity. Anguish leads people to realize that their actions guide humanity and allows them to make judgments about others based on their attitude towards freedom. Nevertheless, "It is not the will that gives value to the possibility. Valuation depends on me, that’s true, but not on my will. It depends on my project, that is to say, on how I perceive the world, how I experience it." Anguish is also associated with Sartre's notion of despair, which he defines as optimistic reliance on a set of possibilities that make action possible. Sartre claims that "In fashioning myself, I fashion Man.", saying that the individual's action will affect and shape mankind. The being-for-itself uses despair to embrace freedom and take meaningful action in full acceptance of whatever consequences may arise as a result. He also describes abandonment as the loneliness that atheists feel when they realize that there is no God to prescribe a way of life, no guidance for people on how to live; that we're abandoned in the sense of being alone in the universe and the arbiters of our own essence. "There is a contingency of human existence. It is a condemnation of their being. Their being is not determined, so it is up to everyone to create their own existence, for which they are then responsible. They cannot not be free, there is a form of necessity for freedom, which can never be given up." Sartre closes his work by emphasizing that existentialism, as it is a philosophy of action and one's defining oneself, is optimistic and liberating. "Sartre offers a description of human beings as a project and as a commitment."
