= The Myth of Sisyphus =

1942 essay by Albert Camus

- Cover of the first edition
- Author: Albert Camus
- Original title: Le mythe de Sisyphe
- Translator: Justin O'Brien
- Language: French
- Subjects: Existentialism; Absurdism
- Published: 1942 (Éditions Gallimard, in French); 1955 (Hamish Hamilton, in English)
- Publication place: France
- Media type: Print
- Pages: 185 (French edition)
- ISBN: 0-679-73373-6

The Myth of Sisyphus (French: Le mythe de Sisyphe, pronounced [lə mit də sizif]) is a 1942 philosophical work by Albert Camus. Influenced by philosophers such as Søren Kierkegaard, Arthur Schopenhauer, and Friedrich Nietzsche, Camus introduces his philosophy of the absurd. The absurd lies in the juxtaposition between the fundamental human need to attribute meaning to life and the "unreasonable silence" of the universe in response. Camus claims that the realization of the absurd does not justify suicide, and instead requires "revolt". He then outlines several approaches to the absurd life. In the final chapter, Camus compares the absurdity of man's life with the situation of Sisyphus, a figure of Greek mythology who was condemned to repeat forever the same meaningless task of pushing a boulder up a mountain, only to see it roll down again just as it nears the top. The essay concludes, "The struggle itself towards the heights is enough to fill a man's heart. One must imagine Sisyphus happy."

The work can be seen in relation to other absurdist works by Camus: the novel The Stranger (1942), the plays The Misunderstanding (1942) and Caligula (1944), and especially the essay The Rebel (1951).

== History ==
Camus began the work in 1940, during the Fall of France, when millions of refugees fled from advancing German armies. While the essay rarely refers to this event, Robert Zaretsky argues that the event prompted his ideas of the absurd. He claims that both a banal event and something as intense as a German invasion will prompt someone to ask "why?" The essay was published in French in 1942.

The English translation by Justin O'Brien was first published in 1955. Included in the translated version is a preface written by Camus while in Paris in 1955. Here Camus states that "even if one does not believe in God, suicide is not legitimate".

== Philosophical context ==
Camus wrote The Myth of Sisyphus against the backdrop of early twentieth-century European philosophy, particularly existentialism and phenomenology. Although often grouped with existentialist thinkers, Camus consistently rejected the existentialist label, insisting that his philosophy of the absurd was distinct from both Kierkegaard's leap of faith and Heidegger's ontology of Being. Instead, Camus argued that the confrontation between humanity's "appetite for meaning" and the universe's "unreasonable silence" constituted the absurd, which must be lived with clarity rather than resolved by appeal to transcendence.

Scholars note that Camus diverged sharply from Soren Kierkegaard and Lev Shestov, who posited that faith provided the only way beyond despair. Camus considered such responses forms of "philosophical suicide," since they abandon reason in favor of religious or metaphysical hope. Similarly, he critiqued Husserlian phenomenology and Hegelian rationalism for elevating reason into abstract systems that obscure the absurd rather than confront it directly.

Commentators have also situated Camus in dialogue with Friedrich Nietzsche. While Nietzsche's notion of eternal recurrence and affirmation of life informed Camus's emphasis on revolt and freedom, Camus rejected Nietzsche's metaphysical implications and instead grounded his thought in the lived experience of the absurd.

In later interpretations, philosophers such as Thomas Nagel and Ronald Aronson have highlighted how Camus's concept of the absurd continues to shape debates in existential ethics, modern humanism, and the philosophy of meaning.

== Summary ==
The essay is dedicated to Pascal Pia and is organized in four chapters and one appendix.

=== Chapter 1: An Absurd Reasoning ===
Camus undertakes the task of answering what he considers to be the only question of philosophy that matters: Does the realization of the meaninglessness and absurdity of life necessarily require suicide?

He begins by describing the following absurd condition: "we build our life on the hope for tomorrow, yet tomorrow brings us closer to death and is the ultimate enemy; people live their lives as if they were not aware of the certainty of death. Once stripped of its common romanticism, the world is a foreign, strange and inhuman place; true knowledge is impossible and rationality and science cannot explain the world: their stories ultimately end in meaningless abstractions, in metaphors. This is the absurd condition and 'from the moment absurdity is recognized, it becomes a passion, the most harrowing of all.'"

It is not the world that is absurd, nor human thought: the absurd arises when the human need to understand meets the unreasonableness of the world, when the "appetite for the absolute and for unity" meets "the impossibility of reducing this world to a rational and reasonable principle."

He then characterizes several philosophies that describe and attempt to deal with this feeling of the absurd, by Martin Heidegger, Karl Jaspers, Lev Shestov, Søren Kierkegaard, and Edmund Husserl. All of these, he claims, commit "philosophical suicide" by reaching conclusions that contradict the original absurd position, either by abandoning reason and turning to God, as in the case of Kierkegaard and Shestov, or by elevating reason and ultimately arriving at ubiquitous Platonic forms and an abstract god, as in the case of Husserl.

For Camus, who sets out to take the absurd seriously and follow it to its final conclusions, these "leaps" cannot convince. Taking the absurd seriously means acknowledging the contradiction between the desire of human reason and the unreasonable world. Suicide, then, also must be rejected: without man, the absurd cannot exist. The contradiction must be lived; reason and its limits must be acknowledged, without false hope. However, the absurd can never be permanently accepted: it requires constant confrontation, constant revolt.

While the question of human freedom in the metaphysical sense loses interest to the absurd man, he gains freedom in a very concrete sense: no longer bound by hope for a better future or eternity, without a need to pursue life's purpose or to create meaning, "he enjoys a freedom with regard to common rules".

To embrace the absurd implies embracing all that the unreasonable world has to offer. Without meaning in life, there is no scale of values. "What counts is not the best living but the most living."

Thus, Camus arrives at three consequences from fully acknowledging the absurd: revolt, freedom, and passion.

=== Chapter 2: The Absurd Man ===
How should the absurd man live? Clearly, no ethical rules apply, as they are all based on higher powers or on justification. "...integrity has no need of rules... 'Everything is permitted,'... is not an outburst of relief or of joy, but rather a bitter acknowledgement of a fact."

Camus then goes on to present examples of the absurd life. He begins with Don Juan, the serial seducer who lives the passionate life to the fullest. "There is no noble love but that which recognizes itself to be both short-lived and exceptional."

The next example is the actor, who depicts ephemeral lives for ephemeral fame. "He demonstrates to what degree appearing creates being. In those three hours, he travels the whole course of the dead-end path that the man in the audience takes a lifetime to cover."

Camus's third example of the absurd man is the conqueror, the warrior who forgoes all promises of eternity to affect and engage fully in human history. He chooses action over contemplation, aware of the fact that nothing can last and no victory is final.

=== Chapter 3: Absurd Creation ===
Here Camus explores the absurd creator or artist. Since explanation is impossible, absurd art is restricted to a description of the myriad experiences in the world. "If the world were clear, art would not exist." Absurd creation, of course, also must refrain from judging and from alluding to even the slightest shadow of hope.

He then analyzes the work of Fyodor Dostoevsky in this light, especially The Diary of a Writer, The Possessed and The Brothers Karamazov. All these works start from the absurd position, and the first two explore the theme of philosophical suicide. However, both The Diary and his last novel, The Brothers Karamazov, ultimately find a path to hope and faith and thus fail as truly absurd creations.

=== Chapter 4: The Myth of Sisyphus ===
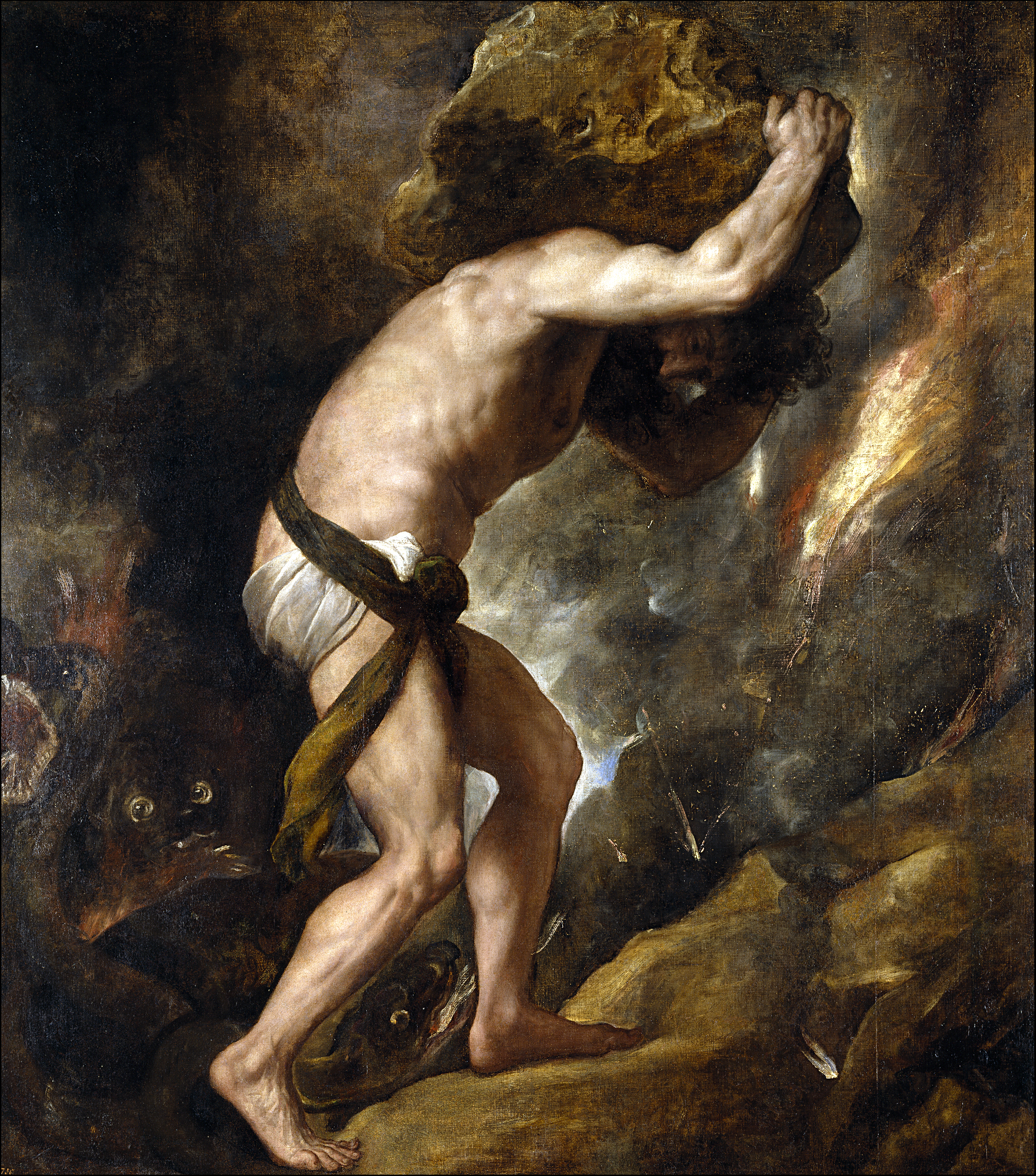
Sisyphus by Titian, 1549

In the last chapter, Camus outlines the legend of Sisyphus who defied the gods and put Death in chains so that no human needed to die. When Death was eventually liberated and it came time for Sisyphus himself to die, he concocted a deceit which let him escape from the underworld. After finally capturing Sisyphus, the gods decided that his punishment would last for all eternity. He would have to push a rock up a mountain; upon reaching the top, the rock would roll down again, leaving Sisyphus to start over. Camus sees Sisyphus as the absurd hero who lives life to the fullest, hates death, and is condemned to a meaningless task.

Camus presents Sisyphus's ceaseless and pointless toil as a metaphor for modern lives spent working at futile jobs in factories and offices. "The workman of today works every day in his life at the same tasks, and this fate is no less absurd. But it is tragic only at the rare moments when it becomes conscious."

Camus is interested in Sisyphus's thoughts when marching down the mountain, to start anew. After the stone falls back down the mountain Camus states that "It is during that return, that pause, that Sisyphus interests me. A face that toils so close to stones is already stone itself! I see that man going back down with a heavy yet measured step toward the torment of which he will never know the end." This is the truly tragic moment when the hero becomes conscious of his wretched condition. He does not have hope, but "there is no fate that cannot be surmounted by scorn." Acknowledging the truth will conquer it; Sisyphus, just like the absurd man, continues pushing. Camus claims that when Sisyphus acknowledges the futility of his task and the certainty of his fate, he is freed to realize the absurdity of his situation and to reach a state of contented acceptance. With a nod to the similarly cursed Greek hero Oedipus, Camus concludes that "all is well," continuing "one must imagine Sisyphus happy."

=== Appendix ===
The essay contains an appendix titled "Hope and the Absurd in the work of Franz Kafka". While Camus acknowledges that Kafka's work represents an exquisite description of the absurd condition, he claims that Kafka fails as an absurd writer because his work retains a glimmer of hope.

=== Ending ===
"I leave Sisyphus at the foot of the mountain! One always finds one's burden again. But Sisyphus teaches the higher fidelity that negates the gods and raises rocks. He too concludes that all is well. This universe henceforth without a master seems to him neither sterile nor futile. Each atom of that stone, each mineral flake of that night filled mountain, in itself forms a world. The struggle itself toward the heights is enough to fill a man's heart. One must imagine Sisyphus happy."

== See also ==
- Eternal return
- Theatre of the Absurd
- The Sickness Unto Death by Søren Kierkegaard

== Sources ==
- The Plague, The Fall, Exile and the Kingdom, and Selected Essays, Albert Camus, Alfred A. Knopf 2004, ISBN 1-4000-4255-0
- Camus, Albert (1955). The Myth of Sisyphus and Other Essays. New York: Alfred A. Knopf. ISBN 0-679-73373-6.
- Sagi, Avi (2011). Is the Absurd the Problem or the Solution?. Salem Press. ISBN 978-1-58765-825-9.
