= Being in itself =

Philosophical concept

Being-in-itself (German: Ansichsein) is the self-contained and fully realized being of objects. It is a term used in early 20th century continental philosophy, especially in the works of Martin Heidegger, Jean-Paul Sartre, Simone de Beauvoir, and other existentialists.

== For Heidegger ==
In the philosophy of Heidegger, Being-in-itself is contrasted with the being of persons, which he terms Dasein (Heidegger 1962, p. H.27). "Dasein means: care of the Being of beings as such that is ecstatically disclosed in care, not only of human Being...Dasein is itself by virtue of its essential relation to Being in general" (Heidegger 2000, p. H.31). Heidegger recognized the dangers inherent in talking about Being in general and particular beings, and thus devoted space in Being and Time and the Introduction to Metaphysics to an explication of the differences, often noted by translators who distinguish Being (Sein), from a being (das Seiende). His attention to the complication is helpful for those who are looking for detailed explanation, but rarely clears the air of confusion.

Dasein is Being which is aware of, and interested in, its own Being. Dasein is, by its nature, invested in social interaction and society. This is because in Heidegger's metaphysical system, one of the most fundamental ways to understand Being is through relationships. All things stand in a relation to all other things – and by virtue of his stress on Dasein's ontological distinction, things may also stand in relation to Dasein (Heidegger 1962, p. H.78). The argument for this claim draws heavily on Hegel's great work, the Phenomenology of Spirit. Essentially, Being in itself is one of Heidegger's main concerns throughout his authorship. Despite Heidegger's interest in it, he returns – more often than not indirectly – to the subject by interrogating other concepts that simply invoke Being without explicitly acknowledging it.

In other words, whereas Heidegger calls the being of persons 'Dasein', he determines 'Being in itself' to be at the same time the most vague and general concept possible to contemplate, but also the topic of greatest interest to him as a philosopher.

== For Sartre ==
Being-in-itself refers to objects in the external world – a mode of existence that simply is. It is not conscious, so it is neither active nor passive and harbors no potentiality for transcendence. This mode of being is relevant to inanimate objects, but not to humans, who Sartre says must always make a choice.

Sartre depicted a man in a café who has applied himself to a portrayal of his role as a waiter. The waiter thinks of himself as being a waiter (as in being-in-itself), which Sartre says is impossible since he cannot be a waiter in the sense that an inkwell is an inkwell. He is primarily a man (being-for-itself), just one who happens to be functioning as a waiter – with no fixed nature or essence, who is constantly recreating himself. He is guilty of focusing on himself as being-in-itself and not being-for-itself. Sartre would say that as a human, a being-for-itself by nature, the waiter is "a being that is not what it is and it is what it is not." Therefore, the waiter who acts as if he is at his very core a waiter "is not what [he] is" – which is to say, he is not solely a waiter – and "is what [he] is not" – meaning that he is many things other than a waiter. In simply playing the part of a waiter, the man in this example is reducing himself to a "being-in-itself" and is therefore in bad faith.

== See also ==
- 20th-century philosophy
- Authenticity
- Bad faith
- Existence
- Existentialism
- Hegelianism
- Noumenon
- Phenomenology
- Role engulfment
