= Bad faith (existentialism) =

Inauthentic action

In existentialism, bad faith (French: mauvaise foi) is the psychological phenomenon whereby individuals act inauthentically, by yielding to the external pressures of society to adopt false values and disown their innate freedom as sentient human beings. Bad faith also derives from the related concepts of self-deception and ressentiment.

In Sartre's view authenticity is the opposite of bad faith and inauthenticity is synonymous with it, though he only sketched out this idea in his writings.

== Freedom and choice ==
Although external circumstances may limit individuals, called facticity, they cannot force a person to follow one of the remaining courses over another. In this sense, the individual still has some freedom of choice. For this reason, an individual may choose in anguish, fully aware that this will have consequences. For Jean-Paul Sartre, to claim that one amongst many conscious possibilities takes undeniable precedence (for instance, "I cannot risk my life, because I must support my family") is to assume the role of an object in the world, not a free agent, but merely at the mercy of circumstance (a being-in-itself that is only its own facticity, i.e., it "is" inside itself, and acts there as a limitation).

== Examples ==
=== Sartre ===
According to Sartre, a person can only be defined negatively, as "what it is not", and this negation is the only positive definition of "what it is". Sartre cites a café waiter, whose movements and conversation are a little too "waiter-esque". His voice has an eagerness to please; he carries food rigidly and ostentatiously; "his movement is quick and forward, a little too precise, a little too rapid". His exaggerated behavior illustrates that he is play-acting as a waiter, as an object in the world and as an automaton whose essence is to be a waiter. That he is obviously acting belies that he is aware that he is not (merely) a waiter, but is rather consciously deceiving himself.

Sartre's second examples involves a young woman on a first date. She ignores the obvious sexual implications of her date's compliments to her physical appearance, but accepts them instead as words directed at her as a human consciousness. As he takes her hand, she lets it rest indifferently in his, "neither consenting nor resisting – a thing" – refusing either to return the gesture or to rebuke it. Thus, she delays the moment when she must choose either to acknowledge his intention and reject or consent to his advances. She conveniently considers her hand only a thing in the world and his compliments as unrelated to her body, playing on her dual human reality as a physical being and as a consciousness separate and free from this physicality.

Thirdly, Sartre notes the (closeted) homosexual who outwardly presents themselves as heteronormative but inwardly acknowledges their desires. Fourthly Sartre mentions the homosexual's friend who urges them to come out. The friend, while appearing to champion honesty and sincerity is also acting in bad faith as they reduce the homosexual to a thing rather than a whole person.

Sartre suggests that, by acting in bad faith, the waiter and the woman are denying their own freedom by using their freedom to do so. They manifestly know they are free, but are actively choosing not to acknowledge it. Bad faith is paradoxical in this regard; when acting in bad faith, a person is actively denying their own freedom, while relying on it to perform the denial. However, Leslie Stevenson believes this characterization of the waiter itself as being an example of bad faith is a misrepresentation of Sartre's intentions.

=== Beauvoir ===
Simone de Beauvoir described three main types of women acting in bad faith: the Narcissist who denies her freedom by construing herself as a desirable object; the Mystic, who invests her freedom in an absolute; and the Woman in Love, who submerges her identity in that of her male object.

She also considered what she called the Serious Man, who subordinated himself to some outside cause, to be in bad faith inasmuch as he denies his own freedom.

== Two modes of consciousness ==
Sartre claims that the consciousness with which we generally consider our surroundings is different from our reflecting on this consciousness; that is, the consciousness of "ourselves being conscious of these surroundings". The first kind of consciousness, before we think about or reflect on our previous consciousness, is pre-reflective consciousness. Reflecting on the pre-reflective consciousness is reflective consciousness.

== Freedom and morality ==
One convinces oneself, in some sense, to be bound to act by external circumstance in order to escape the anguish of freedom. Sartre says that people are "condemned to be free"; whether they adopt an "objective" moral system to do this choosing for them or follow only their pragmatic concerns, they cannot help but be aware that they are not – fundamentally – part of them.

Fundamentally, Sartre believed humankind cannot escape responsibility by adopting an external moral system, as the adoption of such is in itself a choice that we endorse – implicitly or explicitly – for which we must take full responsibility. He argues that one cannot escape this responsibility, as each attempt to part one's self from the freedom of choice is in itself a demonstration of choice and choice is dependent on a person's wills and desires. He states, "I am responsible for my very desire of fleeing responsibilities."

This inner anguish over moral uncertainty is a central underlying theme in existentialism, as the anguish demonstrates a personal feeling of responsibility over the choices one makes throughout life.

== See also ==
- False self
- Albert Camus
- Anomie
- Bad faith
- Existentialism and Humanism
- The Ethics of Ambiguity
