= Dwight H. Terry Lectureship =

Lectureship at Yale University

The Dwight H. Terry Lectureship, also known as the Terry Lectures, was established at Yale University in 1905 by a gift from Dwight H. Terry of Bridgeport, Connecticut. Its purpose is to engage both scholars and the public in a consideration of religion from a humanitarian point of view, in the light of modern science and philosophy. The subject matter has historically been similar to that of the Gifford Lectures in Scotland, and several lecturers have participated in both series.

== Establishment ==
The 1905 deed of gift establishing the lectureship states:

The object of this foundation is not the promotion of scientific investigation and discovery, but rather the assimilation and interpretation of that which has been or shall be hereafter discovered, and its application to human welfare, especially by the building of the truths of science and philosophy into the structure of a broadened and purified religion. The founder believes that such a religion will greatly stimulate intelligent effort for the improvement of human conditions and the advancement of the race in strength and excellence of character. To this end it is desired that a series of lectures be given by men eminent in their respective departments, on ethics, the history of civilization and religion, biblical research, all sciences and branches of knowledge which have an important bearing on the subject, all the great laws of nature, especially of evolution ... also such interpretations of literature and sociology as are in accord with the spirit of this foundation, to the end that the Christian spirit may be nurtured in the fullest light of the world’s knowledge and that mankind may be helped to attain its highest possible welfare and happiness upon this earth.

Although commitment to the gift was made in 1905 it did not mature until 1923, which is when the first Terry lectures were held.

== Lecture format ==
The lectures are free and open to the public. A single installment generally consists of four lectures by the same visiting scholar, given over the course of a month or less. Many of the lectures have been edited into books published by the Yale University Press, and remain in print to this day (see below). From 1999 to 2009 the lectures were recorded and posted on the Terry Lectures website as audio and/or video streams. Starting in 2008, recordings of the lectures have been made available via Yale's YouTube channel.

== Past lectureship holders ==
- 1923–1924: John Arthur Thomson Concerning Evolution: ISBN 978-0-300-13567-1
- 1924–1925: Henry Norris Russell Fate and Freedom: ISBN 978-0-300-13569-5
- 1925–1926: William Ernest Hocking The Self: Its Body and Freedom: ISBN 978-0-404-59191-5
- 1926–1927: Robert Andrews Millikan Evolution in Science and Religion: ISBN 978-0-300-13568-8
- 1927–1928: William Brown Science and Personality: ISBN 978-0-8434-0076-2
- 1928–1929: James Young Simpson Nature: Cosmic, Human, and Divine: ISBN 978-0-300-13565-7
- 1929–1930: William Pepperell Montague Belief Unbound: A Promethean Religion for the Modern World: ISBN 978-0-300-13575-6
- 1930–1931: Hermann Weyl The Open World: ISBN 978-0-918024-71-8
- 1931–1932: Arthur Holly Compton The Freedom of Man: ISBN 978-0-300-13570-1
- 1932–1933: Herbert Spencer Jennings The Universe and Life: ISBN 978-0-300-13652-4
- 1933–1934: John Dewey A Common Faith: ISBN 978-0-300-00069-6
- 1934–1935: Joseph Needham Order and Life: ISBN 978-0-300-13654-8
- 1935–1936: John Macmurray The Structure of Religious Experience: ISBN 978-0-300-13566-4
- 1936–1937: Joseph Barcroft The Brain and Its Environment
- 1937–1938: Carl Gustav Jung Psychology and Religion: ISBN 978-0-300-00137-2
- 1938–1939: Te Rangi Hīroa Anthropology and Religion: ISBN 978-0-208-00950-0
- 1939–1940: Henry Ernest Sigerist Medicine and Human Welfare: ISBN 978-0-300-13574-9
- 1940–1941: Alan Gregg The Furtherance of Medical Research
- 1941–1942: Reinhold Niebuhr
- 1942–1943: Alexander Dunlop Lindsay Religion, Science, and Society in the Modern World: ISBN 978-0-8369-2604-0
- 1942–1943: Jacques Maritain Education at the Crossroads: ISBN 978-0-300-00163-1
- 1943–1944: George Washington Corner Ourselves Unborn: An Embryologist's Essay on Man: ISBN 978-0-300-13578-7
- 1944–1945: Julius Seelye Bixler Conversations with an Unrepentant Liberal: ISBN 978-0-300-13584-8
- 1945–1946: James Bryant Conant On Understanding Science: ISBN 978-0-300-13655-5
- 1946–1947: Henri Frankfort
- 1946–1947: Charles Hartshorne The Divine Relativity: A Social Conception of God: ISBN 978-0-300-02880-5
- 1947–1948: Alexander Stewart Ferguson
- 1948–1949: George Gaylord Simpson The Meaning of Evolution: ISBN 978-0-300-00229-4
- 1949–1950: Erich Fromm Psychoanalysis and Religion: ISBN 978-0-300-00089-4
- 1950–1951: Paul Johannes Tillich The Courage to Be: ISBN 978-0-300-08471-9
- 1951–1952: Jerome Clarke Hunsaker Aeronautics at the Mid-Century: ISBN 978-0-300-13577-0
- 1953–1954: Gordon Willard Allport Becoming: Basic Considerations for a Psychology of Personality: ISBN 978-0-300-00002-3
- 1954–1955: Pieter Geyl Use and Abuse of History: ISBN 978-0-300-13651-7
- 1955–1956: Rebecca West The Court and the Castle: Some Treatments of a Recurrent Theme
- 1956–1957: Errol Eustace Harris The Idea of God in Modern Thought / Revelation Through Reason: Religion in the Light of Science and Philosophy: ISBN 978-0-317-27547-6
- 1957–1958: Margaret Mead Continuities in Cultural Evolution: ISBN 978-0-7658-0604-8
- 1958–1959: Hermann Dörries Constantine and Religious Liberty: ISBN 978-0-300-13653-1
- 1961–1962: Paul Ricoeur The Philosopher Before Symbols (published as Freud and Philosophy: An Essay on Interpretation: ISBN 978-0-300-02189-9 )
- 1961–1962: Norbert Wiener Prolegomena to Theology
- 1962–1963: Michael Polanyi Man and Thought: A Symbiosis / The Tacit Dimension: ISBN 978-0-8446-5999-2
- 1963–1964: Walter J. Ong The Presence of the Word: Some Prolegomena for Cultural and Religious History: ISBN 978-0-300-09973-7
- 1964–1965: James Munro Cameron Images of Authority: A Consideration of the Concept of Regnum and Sacerdotium: ISBN 978-0-300-13580-0
- 1966–1967: Loren Eiseley
- 1967–1968: Clifford Geertz In Search of Islam: Religious Change in Indonesia / Islam Observed: Religious Development in Morocco and Indonesia: ISBN 978-0-226-28511-5
- 1968–1969: Albert J. Reiss Jr. Civility and the Moral Order: The Police and the Public: ISBN 978-0-300-01646-8
- 1971–1972: James Hillman Re-Visioning Psychology: ISBN 978-0-06-063931-0
- 1973–1974: Father Theodore M. Hesburgh The Humane Imperative: A Challenge for the Year 2000: ISBN 978-0-300-13579-4
- 1975–1976: David Baken And They Took Themselves Wives: Male Female Relations in the Bible
- 1976–1977: Philip Rieff
- 1977–1978: Hans Küng Freud and the Problem of God: ISBN 978-0-300-04723-3
- 1978–1979: Adin Steinsaltz
- 1979–1980: Hans Jonas Technology and Ethics: The Imperative of Responsibility: ISBN 978-0-226-40597-1
- 1985–1986: Stephen Jay Gould Darwin and Dr. Doolittle: ‘Just History’ as the Wellspring of Nature’s Order
- 1986–1987: Eric R. Kandel Cell and Molecular Biological Explorations of Learning and Memory
- 1988–1989: Joshua Lederberg Science and Modern Life
- 1993–1994: Walter J. Gehring Genetic Control of Development: ISBN 978-0-300-07409-3
- 1996–1997 Rev. John Polkinghorne Belief in God in an Age of Science: ISBN 978-0-300-07294-5
- 1998: David Hartman Struggling for the Soul of Israel: A Jewish Response to History: ISBN 978-0-300-08378-1
- 1999: Bas C. Van Fraassen The Empirical Stance: ISBN 978-0-300-10306-9
- 2000: Peter Singer One World: The Ethics and Politics of Globalization: ISBN 978-0-300-10305-2
- 2001: Francisco J. Ayala From Biology to Ethics: An Evolutionist's View of Human Nature
- 2003: H.C. Erik Midelfort Exorcism and Enlightenment: Johann Joseph Gassner and the Demons of 18th-Century Germany: ISBN 978-0-300-10669-5
- 2003: Mary Douglas Writing in Circles: Ring Composition as a Creative Stimulus: ISBN 978-0-300-11762-2
- 2004 David Sloan Wilson Evolution for Everyone
- 2006 (Centennial Conference): Ronald L. Numbers Aggressors, Victims, and Peacemakers: Historical Actors in the Drama of Science and Religion
- 2006 (Centennial Conference): Kenneth R. Miller Darwin, God, and Dover: What the Collapse of 'Intelligent Design' Means for Science and for Faith in America
- 2006 (Centennial Conference): Alvin Plantinga Science and Religion: Why Does the Debate Continue?
- 2006 (Centennial Conference): Lawrence M. Krauss Religion vs. Science? From the White House to Classroom
- 2006 (Centennial Conference): Robert Wuthnow No Contradictions Here: Science, Religion, and the Culture of All Reasonable Possibilities
- 2006: Barbara Herrnstein Smith Natural Reflections: Human Cognition at the Nexus of Science and Religion " ISBN 978-0-300-14034-7
- 2007: Ahmad Dallal Islam, Science, and the Challenge of History : ISBN 978-0-300-17771-8
- 2008: Terry Eagleton Faith and Fundamentalism: Is Belief in Richard Dawkins Necessary for Salvation? : ISBN 978-0-300-15179-4
- 2008: Donald S. Lopez, Jr. The Scientific Buddha: Past, Present, Future : ISBN 978-0-226-49312-1
- 2009: Marilynne Robinson Absence of Mind: The Dispelling of Inwardness from the Modern Myth of the Self : ISBN 978-0-300-17147-1
- 2010: Joel Primack and Nancy Ellen Abrams Cosmic Society: The New Universe and the Human Future : ISBN 978-0-300-16508-1
- 2012: Keith Stewart Thomson Jefferson and Darwin: Science and Religion in Troubled Times
- 2013: Philip Kitcher Secular Humanism
- 2014: Wendy Doniger The Manipulation of Religion by the Sciences of Politics and Pleasure in Ancient India
- 2015: Janet Browne Becoming Darwin: History, Memory, and Biography
- 2016-17: Kwame Anthony Appiah The Anatomy of Religion
- 2017: Judith Farquhar Reality, Reason, and Action In and Beyond Chinese Medicine
- 2018: Thomas E. Lovejoy The World of the Born and the World of the Made: A New Vision of Our Emerald Planet
- 2022: Karen Barad Energetics of the Otherwise and the Material Force of Justice: Diffractive Readings of Walter Benjamin and Quantum Physics
- 2024: Lorraine Daston Natural Disasters and the Question of Blame

== See also ==
- Silliman Memorial Lectures
