= Search for a Method =

1957 book by Jean-Paul Sartre

- Author: Jean-Paul Sartre
- Original title: Questions de méthode
- Translator: Hazel Barnes
- Language: French
- Subject: Marxism
- Published: 1957 (Éditions Gallimard, in French); 1963 (Alfred A. Knopf, in English)
- Publication place: France
- Media type: Print (hardcover and paperback)
- Pages: 132 (original edition); 228 (1968 Vintage edition)
- ISBN: 978-0394704647

Search for a Method or The Problem of Method (French: Questions de méthode) is a 1957 essay by the philosopher Jean-Paul Sartre, in which the author attempts to reconcile Marxism with existentialism. The first version of the essay was published in the Polish journal Twórczość; an adapted version appeared later that year in Les Temps modernes, and later served as an introduction for Sartre's Critique of Dialectical Reason (Paris, 1960). Sartre argues that existentialism and Marxism are compatible, even complementary, even though Marxism's materialism and determinism might seem to contradict the abstraction and radical freedom of existentialism.

== Summary ==
=== Marxism and Existentialism ===
Sartre's opening chapter discusses the relationship between Marxism and existentialism. Sartre sees Marxism as the dominant philosophy for the current era of history and existentialism as a reinforcing complement. Most of the chapter discusses how existentialism fails to stand on its own as a school of thought while Marxism has become corrupted by the Soviets and other orthodox Communists who abuse the system of thought. Sartre sees existentialism as a reaction to this abuse.

Sartre opens his first chapter by defining philosophy. He argues that there are many philosophies and that a current, active philosophy unifies all current knowledge and represents the "rising" class becoming conscious of itself. Sartre breaks modern philosophy down into three eras: mercantile John Locke and René Descartes, industrial Immanuel Kant and Georg Wilhelm Friedrich Hegel, and contemporary Karl Marx. Sartre classifies existentialism as an ideology instead of a philosophy since it failed to establish itself as an independent system of thought and did not establish itself as the conscious perspective of a new class. Early existentialism, represented by Søren Kierkegaard, did not stand on its own as a unified system of thought, but was solely a reply and reaction to the philosophy of Hegel. Karl Jaspers also failed to establish existentialism in a place of historical importance, since his theories are directed inward toward the self instead of outward to society.

Sartre then turns to his own experience with Marx. He describes an early attraction to Marx's thought since it better described the real condition of the proletariat than the "optimistic humanism" taught at his university. Despite this affinity toward Marx's works, Sartre claims that his generation's interpretation of Marxism remained tainted by idealism and individualism until World War II broke down the dominant societal structures. Despite this apparent victory of Marxism, existentialism persisted because Marxism stagnated. Marxism became a tool to justify the domestic and foreign policies of the Soviet Union. The Soviets halted the organic conflict and debate that allows a philosophy to progress, and turned Marxist materialism into an idealism in which reality was made to conform to the a priori ideology of Soviet bureaucrats. Sartre points to the Hungarian Uprising of 1956 where Soviet leaders assumed that any revolt must be counter-revolutionary and anti-Marxist when in fact, the Hungarian revolt came directly from the working class. In contrast to this inflexible thinking, Sartre points to Marx's writings on the Revolutions of 1848 and the French coup d'état of 1851 which explored and examined contemporary class relations instead of taking them as given. Sartre criticizes the analysis of the Marxists of his day, which he considers a superficial attempt to verify "eternal" Marxist dogmas instead of seeking new understanding from historical perspective as Marx himself did.

Sartre turns his criticism toward other methods of investigation. He says that "American sociology" has too much "theoretic uncertainty" while the once promising psychoanalysis has stagnated. Unlike these methods and the generally dominant idealism, existentialism and Marxism offer a possible means of understanding mankind and the world as a totality. Sartre claims that the class war predicted by Marxism has failed to occur because orthodox Marxism has become too rigid and "Scholastic". Despite its stagnation, Marxism remains the philosophy of this time. Both existentialism and Marxism see the world in dialectical terms where individual facts are meaningless; truth is found not in facts themselves but in their interaction: they only gain significance as part of a totality. György Lukács argued that existentialism and Marxist materialism could not be compatible; Sartre responds with a passage from Engels asserting that the economic dialectic is the driving force of history, parallel to Sartre's dialectically driven existentialism. Sartre concludes the chapter by approvingly quoting Marx from Das Kapital: "The reign of freedom does not begin in fact until the time when the work imposed by necessity and external finality shall cease..." That is, human freedom is limited by economic scarcity, and Marxism will remain the only relevant philosophy until scarcity is overcome; until this is achieved, no real conception of a successor theory will be possible, only empty speculations.

=== The Problem of Mediations and Auxiliary Disciplines ===
Sartre opens the chapter by asking "Why, then, are we not simply Marxists?" Because Marxism provides guiding principles and problems, but not knowledge. Contemporary Marxists regard Marxist theory as a source of actual knowledge, but Sartre sees it only as a set of problems in search of a method. As in the first chapter, Sartre sees Marxism's flaw in rigidity: an "a priori" theory that forces events into "prefabricated molds." Sartre returns to Lukács as a foil. Lukács believes that the realization of German existentialism was Nazism, and he dismisses French existentialism as a petit bourgeois reaction to the German occupation. Sartre rejects Lukács' view, pointing out that, while Heidegger embraced the Nazis, Jaspers did not. Sartre also began work on his philosophy in 1930 and was wrapping up his work by the time of the occupation. He argues that, as a Marxist, Lukács is incapable of understanding Heidegger and existentialism. Marxism takes events and constructs universals, then imposes those universals on subsequent events. Existentialism does not assume a single, real totality, but sees history as an interactive relationship between events and humans.

Sartre turns to the example of the French Revolution. While Marxists have argued that the complicated events of the Revolution can be broken down into class conflict, Sartre says the Revolution cannot be understood only on the terms of Marxist class analysis. He proposes a process of "mediations" to analyze how ideological and social factors guide the course of history, which is only indirectly influenced by economics and class.

=== Progressive-Regressive Method ===
Sartre proposes a method of thought that combines historical materialism with existentialist psychoanalysis.

== Reception ==
In the introduction to her translation of Search for a Method, the philosopher Hazel Barnes compares Sartre's views of Marx and Marxism to those of Erich Fromm, as expressed in Marx's Concept of Man (1961). The philosopher Walter Kaufmann argues that Sartre's embrace of Marxism represents the end of existentialism, since following the publication of Search for a Method, neither Sartre nor any other major thinker writes as an existentialist (though Kaufmann adds that existentialism understood in a looser sense continues).
