= Ruth Nanda Anshen =

American philosopher, author and editor

- Born: June 14, 1900; Lynn, Massachusetts
- Died: December 2, 2003 (aged 103); New York City, New York, U.S.
- Education: Boston University
- Occupations: Editor, Philosopher

Ruth Nanda Anshen (June 14, 1900 – December 2, 2003) was an American philosopher, author and editor. She was the author of several books including The Anatomy of Evil, Biography of An Idea, Morals Equals Manners and The Mystery of Consciousness: A Prescription for Human Survival.

== Life ==
Anshen was born on June 14, 1900, in Lynn, Massachusetts, to Jewish Russian immigrants. She studied at Boston University under Alfred North Whitehead. During her education, she developed a desire to unite scholars from all over the world from varying fields. In 1941, she put together the Science of Culture Series, hoping to develop a "unitary principle under which there could be subsumed and evaluated the nature of man and the nature of life, the relationship of knowledge to life."

== Death ==
Ruth Nanda Anshen died at age 103 in New York City on December 2, 2003.

== Affiliations and legacy ==
She was a Fellow of the Royal Society of Arts of London, a member of the American Philosophical Association, the History of Science Society, and the Metaphysical Society of America. In 1958, she established the Anshen-Columbia University Seminars on the Nature of Man.

In the 1990s, the Council for the Anshen Transdisciplinary Lectureships in Art, Science and the Philosophy of Culture included Noam Chomsky, Fred Hoyle, Paul O. Kristeller, Edith Porada, Meyer Schapiro, Hugh Thomas, John A. Wheeler, and C. N. Yang.

== Career ==
Anshen was the editor of several series of books, including the World Perspectives series, published by Harper & Row, of which two volumes were by Erich Fromm: The Art of Loving (Volume 9) and To Have or to Be? (Volume 50). Another notable was Deschooling Society (Volume 44) by Ivan Illich. She also edited the Religious Perspectives Series (Harper & Row), Perspectives in Humanism Series (World Publishing Company), The Tree of Life Series (Seabury Press), and The Convergence Series (Columbia University Press).

== Selected works ==
- Freedom: Its Meaning (1940)
- Beyond Victory (1943)
- The Family: Its Function and Destiny (1949)
- Moral Principles of Action: Man's Ethical Imperative (1952)
- Mid-East : world-center, yesterday, today, and tomorrow (1956)
- Language : an enquiry into its meaning and function (1957)
- The Reality of the Devil: The Evil in Man (1974)
- The Anatomy of Evil (1985), Revised edition of The Reality of the Devil: Evil in Man (1974)
- Biography of An Idea (1986)
- Morals Equals Manners (1992)
- The Mystery of Consciousness: A Prescription for Human Survival (1994)

== See also ==
- American philosophy
