= Psychology of religion =

Analytic approach to religion

Psychology of religion consists of the application of psychological methods and interpretive frameworks to the diverse contents of religious traditions as well as to both religious and irreligious individuals. The various methods and frameworks can be summarized according to the classic distinction between the natural-scientific and human-scientific approaches. The first cluster amounts to objective, quantitative, and preferably experimental procedures for testing hypotheses about causal connections among the objects of one's study. In contrast, the human-scientific approach accesses the human world of experience using qualitative, phenomenological, and interpretive methods. This approach aims to discern meaningful, rather than causal, connections among the phenomena one seeks to understand.

Psychologists of religion pursue three major projects:

1. systematic description, especially of religious contents, attitudes, experiences, and expressions
2. explanation of the origins of religion, both in the history of the human race and in individual lives, taking into account a diversity of influences
3. mapping out the consequences of religious attitudes and conduct, both for the individual and for society at large.

The psychology of religion first arose as a self-conscious discipline in the late 19th century, but all three of these tasks have a history going back many centuries before that.

== Overview ==
The challenge for the psychology of religion is essentially threefold:

1. to provide a thoroughgoing description of the objects of investigation, whether they be shared religious content (e.g., a tradition's ritual observances) or individual experiences, attitudes, or conduct;
2. to account in psychological terms for the rise of such phenomena, whether they be in individual lives or not;
3. to clarify the outcomes – the fruits, as William James put it – of these phenomena, for individuals, and the larger society. These fruits may be both positive and negative.

The first, descriptive task naturally requires a clarification of one's terms – above all, the word religion. Historians of religion have long underscored the problematic character of this term. They note that its usage over the centuries has changed in significant ways, generally in the direction of reification. The early psychologists of religion were fully aware of these difficulties, typically acknowledging that the definitions they chose were to some degree arbitrary. With the rise of positivistic trends in psychology over the 20th century, especially the demand that all phenomena be operationalized by quantitative procedures, psychologists of religion developed a multitude of scales, most of them developed for use by Protestant Christians. Factor analysis was also brought into play by both psychologists and sociologists of religion, to establish a fixed core of dimensions and a corresponding set of scales. The justification and adequacy of these efforts, especially in the light of constructivist and other postmodern viewpoints, remains a matter of debate.

In the last several decades, especially among clinical psychologists, a preference for the terms "spirituality" and "spiritual" has emerged, along with efforts to distinguish them from "religion" and "religious." Especially in the United States, "religion" has for many become associated with sectarian institutions and their obligatory creeds and rituals, thus giving the word a negative cast; "spirituality", in contrast, is positively constructed as deeply individual and subjective, as a universal capacity to apprehend and accord one's life with higher realities. In fact, "spirituality" has likewise undergone an evolution in the West, from a time when it was essentially a synonym for religion in its original, subjective meaning. Today, efforts are ongoing to "operationalize" these terms, with little regard for their history in their Western context, and with the apparent realist assumption that underlying them are fixed qualities identifiable using empirical procedures.

Schnitker and Emmons theorized that the understanding of religion as a search for meaning makes implications in the three psychological areas of motivation, cognition and social relationships. The cognitive aspects relate to God and a sense of purpose, the motivational ones to the need to control, and the religious search for meaning is also woven into social communities.

== History ==
=== Edwin Diller Starbuck ===
Edwin Diller Starbuck is considered a pioneer of the psychology of religion and his book Psychology of Religion (1899) has been described as the first book in the genre. This book was endorsed by William James who collaborated by writing its preface. Starbuck's work would influence James on writing his own book, The Varieties of Religious Experience, with James thanking him in the preface for having "made over to me his large collection of manuscript material". In the book itself James mentions Starbuck's name 46 times and cites him on several different occasions.

=== William James ===
American psychologist and philosopher William James (1842–1910) is regarded by most psychologists of religion as the founder of the field. He served as president of the American Psychological Association, and wrote one of the first psychology textbooks. In the psychology of religion, James' influence endures. His Varieties of Religious Experience is considered to be the classic work in the field, and references to James' ideas are common at professional conferences.

James distinguished between institutional religion and personal religion. Institutional religion refers to the religious group or organization and plays an important part in a society's culture. Personal religion, in which the individual has mystical experience, can be experienced regardless of the culture.James was most interested in understanding personal religious experience.

In studying personal religious experiences, James made a distinction between healthy-minded and sick-souled religiousness. Individuals predisposed to healthy-mindedness tend to ignore the evil in the world and focus on the positive and the good. James used examples of Walt Whitman and the "mind-cure" religious movement to illustrate healthy-mindedness in The Varieties of Religious Experience. In contrast, individuals predisposed to having a sick-souled religion are unable to ignore evil and suffering and need a unifying experience, religious or otherwise, to reconcile good and evil. James included quotations from Leo Tolstoy and John Bunyan to illustrate the sick soul.

William James' hypothesis of pragmatism stems from the efficacy of religion. If an individual believes in and performs religious activities, and those actions happen to work, then that practice appears the proper choice for the individual. However, if the processes of religion have little efficacy, then there is no rationality for continuing the practice.

In The Varieties of Religious Experience, James defined religion as "the feelings, acts, and experiences of individuals in relation to what they perceive as the divine," emphasizing that religion should be studied through our personal consciousness rather than a fixed, rigid, institutional doctrine. Additionally, he also explored a multitude of religious processes, including religious conversion, distinguishing between gradual and sudden transformations in belief and identity and the reasons of which why they happen. On top of that, he analyzed mystical experiences and identifying characteristics such as ineffability, noetic quality (feels like truth/knowledge), transiency, and passivity (not controlled by the person). His pragmatic approach further argued that religious beliefs should be evaluated based on their psychological effects on individuals, playing a large role in establishing the foundation for the psychology of religion as a scientific field.

James also believed that the different religious experiences could bring benefits and positive outcomes to society. In Varieties of Religious Experience, he says:

"We must judge the tree by its fruit. The best fruits of the religious experience are the best things history has to offer. The highest flights of charity, devotion, trust, patience, and bravery to which the wings of human nature have spread themselves, have all been flown for religious ideals." ― William James, The Varieties of Religious Experience

=== Other early theorists ===
==== G.W.F. Hegel ====
Georg Wilhelm Friedrich Hegel (1770–1831) described all systems of religion, philosophy, and social science as expressions of the basic urge of consciousness to learn about itself and its surroundings, and record its findings and hypotheses. Thus, religion is only a form of that search for knowledge, within which humans record various experiences and reflections. Others, compiling and categorizing these writings in various ways, form the consolidated worldview as articulated by that religion, philosophy, social science, etc. His work The Phenomenology of Spirit was a study of how various types of writing and thinking draw from and re-combine with the individual and group experiences of various places and times, influencing the current forms of knowledge and worldviews that are operative in a population. This activity is the functioning of an incomplete group mind, where each is accessing the recorded wisdom of others. His works often include detailed descriptions of the psychological motivations involved in thought and behavior, e.g., the struggle of a community or nation to know itself and thus correctly govern itself. In Hegel's system, Religion is one of the major repositories of wisdom to be used in these struggles, representing a huge body of recollections from humanity's past in various stages of its development.

==== Sigmund Freud ====
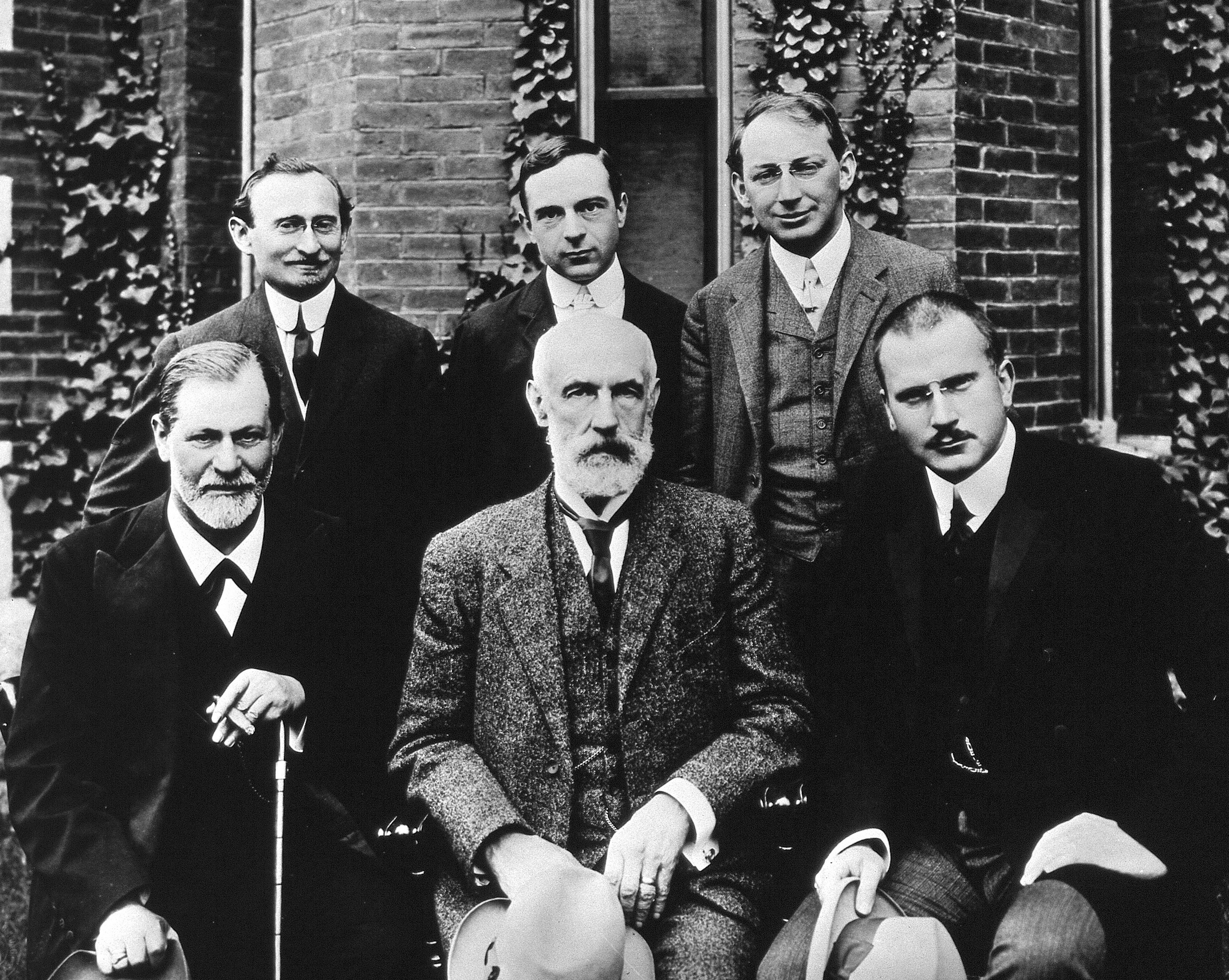
Group photo 1909 in front of Clark University. Front row: Sigmund Freud, G. Stanley Hall, Carl Jung. Back row: Abraham Brill, Ernest Jones, Sándor Ferenczi.

Sigmund Freud (1856–1939) gave explanations of the genesis of religion in his various writings. In Totem and Taboo, he applied the idea of the Oedipus complex (involving unresolved sexual feelings of, for example, a son toward his mother and hostility toward his father) and postulated its emergence in the primordial stage of human development.

In Moses and Monotheism, Freud reconstructed biblical history by his general theory. His ideas were also developed in The Future of an Illusion. When Freud spoke of religion as an illusion, he maintained that it "is a fantasy structure from which a man must be set free if he is to grow to maturity."

Freud viewed the idea of God as being a version of the father image, and religious belief as at bottom infantile and neurotic. Authoritarian religion, Freud believed, is dysfunctional and alienates man from himself.

==== Carl Jung ====
The Swiss psychoanalyst Carl Jung (1875–1961) adopted a very different posture, one that was more sympathetic to religion and more concerned with a positive appreciation of religious symbolism. Jung considered the question of the metaphysical existence of God to be unanswerable by psychologists and adopted a kind of agnosticism.

Jung postulated, in addition to the personal unconscious (roughly adopting Freud's concept), the collective unconscious, which is the repository of human experience and which contains "archetypes" (i.e., basic images that are universal in that they recur regardless of culture). He viewed the irruption of these images from the unconscious into the realm of consciousness as the basis of religious experience and often of artistic creativity. Some of Jung's writings have been devoted to elucidating some of the archetypal symbols, and include his work in comparative mythology.

==== Alfred Adler ====
Austrian psychiatrist Alfred Adler (1870–1937), who parted ways with Freud, emphasized the role of goals and motivation in his Individual Psychology. One of Adler's most famous ideas is that we try to compensate for inferiorities that we perceive in ourselves. A lack of power often lies at the root of feelings of inferiority. One way that religion enters into this picture is through our beliefs in God, which are characteristic of our tendency to strive for perfection and superiority. For example, in many religions, God is considered to be perfect and omnipotent, and commands people likewise to be perfect. If we, too, achieve perfection, we become one with God. By identifying with God in this way, we compensate for our imperfections and feelings of inferiority.

Our ideas about God are important indicators of how we view the world. According to Adler, these ideas have changed over time, as our vision of the world – and our place in it – has changed. Consider this example that Adler offers: the traditional belief that people were placed deliberately on earth as God's ultimate creation is being replaced with the idea that people have evolved by natural selection. This coincides with a view of God not as a real being, but as an abstract representation of nature's forces. In this way, our view of God has changed from one that was concrete and specific to one that is more general. From Adler's vantage point, this is a relatively ineffective perception of God because it is so general that it fails to convey a strong sense of direction and purpose.

An important aspect of Adler's perspective is that the idea of God serves as a motivating force for human behavior, affecting and shaping our actions that have real consequences for both individuals and the society as a whole. Our view of God is important because it embodies our goals and, in turn, directs our patters of social interaction.

Compared to science, another social movement, religion is more efficient because it motivates people more effectively. According to Adler, only when science begins to capture the same religious fervor, and promotes the welfare of all segments of society, will the two be more equal in peoples' eyes.

==== Gordon Allport ====
In his 1950 book The Individual and His Religion, Gordon Allport (1897–1967) illustrates how people may use religion in different ways. He makes a distinction between Mature religion and Immature religion. Mature religious sentiment is how Allport characterized the person whose approach to religion is dynamic, open-minded, and able to maintain links between inconsistencies. In contrast, immature religion is self-serving and generally represents the negative stereotypes that people have about religion.

More recently, this distinction has been encapsulated in the terms "intrinsic religion", referring to a genuine, heartfelt devout faith, and "extrinsic religion", referring to a more utilitarian use of religion as a means to an end, such as church attendance to gain social status. These dimensions of religion were measured on the Religious Orientation Scale of Allport and Ross. The third form of religious orientation has been described by Daniel Batson. This refers to treatment of religion as an open-ended search.

More specifically, it has been seen by Batson as comprising a willingness to view religious doubts positively, acceptance that religious orientation can change and existential complexity, the belief that one's religious beliefs should be shaped from personal crises that one has experienced in one's life. Batson refers to extrinsic, intrinsic and quests respectively as religion-as-means, religion-as-end, and religion-as-quest, and measures these constructs on the Religious Life Inventory.

==== Erik H. Erikson ====
Erik Erikson (1902–1994) is best known for his theory of psychological development, which has its roots in the psychoanalytic importance of identity in personality. His biographies of Gandhi and Martin Luther reveal Erikson's positive view of religion. He considered religions to be important influences in successful personality development because they are the primary way that cultures promote the virtues associated with each stage of life. Religious rituals facilitate this development. Erikson's theory has not benefited from systematic empirical study, but it remains an influential and well-regarded theory in the psychological study of religion.

==== Erich Fromm ====
The American scholar Erich Fromm (1900–1980) modified the Freudian theory and produced a more complex account of the functions of religion. In his book Psychoanalysis and Religion he responded to Freud's theories by explaining that part of the modification is viewing the Oedipus complex as based not so much on sexuality as on a "much more profound desire", namely, the childish desire to remain attached to protecting figures. The right religion, in Fromm's estimation, can, in principle, foster an individual's highest potentialities, but religion in practice tends to relapse into being neurotic.

According to Fromm, humans need a stable frame of reference. Religion fills this need. In effect, humans crave answers to questions that no other source of knowledge has an answer to, which only religion may seem to answer. However, a sense of free will must be given for religion to appear healthy. An authoritarian notion of religion appears detrimental.

==== Rudolf Otto ====
Rudolf Otto (1869–1937) was a German Protestant theologian and scholar of comparative religion. Otto's most famous work, The Idea of the Holy (first published in 1917 as Das Heilige), defines the concept of the holy as that which is numinous. Otto explained the numinous as a "non-rational, non-sensory experience or feeling whose primary and immediate object is outside the self." It is a mystery (Latin: mysterium tremendum) that is both fascinating (fascinans) and terrifying at the same time, a mystery that causes trembling and fascination, attempting to explain that inexpressible and perhaps supernatural emotional reaction of wonder drawing us to seemingly ordinary and/or religious experiences of grace. This sense of emotional wonder appears evident at the root of all religious experiences. Through this emotional wonder, we suspend our rational mind for non-rational possibilities. This book focused mainly on Christian belief, but looked at the numinosity of other religious systems.

The Idea of the Holy also set out a paradigm for the study of religion that focuses on the need to realize the religious as a non-reducible, original category in its own right. This paradigm was under much attack between approximately 1950 and 1990 but has made a strong comeback since then.

=== Modern thinkers ===
Autobiographal accounts of 20th-century psychology of religion as a field have been supplied by numerous modern psychologists of religion, primarily based in Europe, but also by several US-based psychologists such as Ralph W. Hood and Donald Capps.

==== Allen Bergin ====
Allen Bergin is noted for his 1980 paper "Psychotherapy and Religious Values", which is known as a landmark in scholarly acceptance that religious values do, in practice, influence psychotherapy. He received the Distinguished Professional Contributions to Knowledge award from the American Psychological Association in 1989 and was cited as challenging "psychological orthodoxy to emphasize the importance of values and religion in therapy."

==== Robert A. Emmons ====
Robert A. Emmons offered a theory of "spiritual strivings" in his 1999 book, The Psychology of Ultimate Concerns. With support from empirical studies, Emmons argued that spiritual strivings foster personality integration because they exist at a higher level of the personality.

==== Ralph W. Hood Jr. ====
Ralph W. Hood Jr. is a professor of psychology at the University of Tennessee at Chattanooga. He is a former editor of the Journal for the Scientific Study of Religion and a former co-editor of the Archive for the Psychology of Religion and The International Journal for the Psychology of Religion. He is Past President of Division 36 of the American Psychological Association and a recipient of its William James Award. He has published several hundred articles and book chapters on the psychology of religion and has authored, co-authored, or edited thirteen volumes, all dealing with the psychology of religion.

==== Kenneth Pargament ====
Kenneth Pargament is noted for his book Psychology of Religion and Coping (1997), as well as for a 2007 book on religion and psychotherapy, and a sustained research program on religious coping. He is professor of psychology at Bowling Green State University (Ohio, US), and has published more than 100 papers on the subject of religion and spirituality in psychology. Pargament led the design of a questionnaire called the "RCOPE" to measure Religious Coping strategies. Pargament has distinguished between three types of styles for coping with stress:

1. Collaborative, in which people co-operate with God to deal with stressful events;
2. Deferring, in which people leave everything to God; and
3. Self-directed, in which people do not rely on God and try exclusively to solve problems by their own efforts. He also describes four major stances toward religion that have been adopted by psychotherapists in their work with clients, which he calls the religiously rejectionist, exclusivist, constructivist, and pluralist stances.

==== James Hillman ====
James Hillman, at the end of his book Re-Visioning Psychology, reverses James' position of viewing religion through psychology, urging instead that we view psychology as a variety of religious experience. He concludes: "Psychology as religion implies imagining all psychological events as effects of Gods in the soul."

==== Julian Jaynes ====
Julian Jaynes, primarily in his book The Origin of Consciousness in the Breakdown of the Bicameral Mind, proposed that religion (and some other psychological phenomena such as hypnosis and schizophrenia) is a remnant of a relatively recent time in human development, prior to the advent of consciousness. Jaynes hypothesized that hallucinated verbal commands helped non-conscious early man to perform tasks promoting human survival. Starting about 10,000 BCE, selective pressures favored the hallucinated verbal commands for social control, and they came to be perceived as an external, rather than internal, voice commanding the person to take some action. These were hence often explained as originating from invisible gods, spirits, and ancestors.

== Research Methods ==
The way psychology of religion is researched can be attributed to a multitude of empirical methods that study religious beliefs and behaviors through surveys from various communities and experimental designs that elicit such reactions that are measurable to the researchers. Essentially, they examine how religious attitudes have developed and changed over time. The goal for researchers is to analyze religion as somewhat of a measurable psychological phenomenon, rather than a philosophical or theological concept that would otherwise be abstract, and difficult to grasp.

In terms of the areas that researchers are more likely to examine, cognitive processes such as belief formation, emotional responses to religious experiences, and the influence of social environments on religious identity are most frequently on that list. Researchers also examine how religion interacts with fields we, the general public, may be more familiar with, such as mental health and it's relation to psychological effects made by religion, how individuals make decisions using their moral compass, and how groups behave and interact with each other (This is done most often integrating findings from cognitive and social psychology).

== Hypotheses on the role of religion ==
There are three primary hypotheses on the role of religion in the modern world.

=== Secularization ===
The first hypothesis, secularization, holds that science and technology will take the place of religion. Secularization supports the separation of religion from politics, ethics, and psychology. Taking this position even further, Taylor explains that secularization denies transcendence, divinity, and rationality in religious beliefs.

=== Religious transformation ===
Challenges to the secularization hypothesis led to significant revisions, resulting in the religious transformation hypothesis. This perspective holds that general trends towards individualism and social disintegration will produce changes in religion, making religious practice more individualized and spiritually focused. This in turn is expected to produce more spiritual seeking, although not exclusive to religious institutions. Eclecticism, which draws from multiple religious/spiritual systems, and New Age movements are also predicted to result.

Syncretism is another potential result of religious transformation. Despite it and eclecticism being similar, the two differ in that syncretism seeks cohesion between the theories and practices involved, usually entirely religious, whilst eclecticism isn't particularly focused on a central paradigm and takes many different ideas from various fields of thought. Syncretism is claimed by some authors to be in partial opposition to the religious transformation hypothesis, with Trevor Getz saying "Syncretism was a form of cultural survival." and a way to protect a religion in the face of oppression through hiding it in another religion. This is to say syncretism was often not formed due to individualized spiritual seeking, but instead caused by the mass mixing or imposition of different cultures during conquest or migration. Others like Jerry H. Bentley have provided the perspective that it is a way to mediate tensions and make two clashing cultures more harmonious with one another.

=== Cultural divide ===
In response to the religious transformation hypothesis, Ronald Inglehart piloted the renewal of the secularization hypothesis. His argument hinges on the premise that religion develops to fill the human need for security. Therefore, the development of social and economic security in Europe explains its corresponding secularization due to a lack of need for religion. However, religion continues in the third world where social and economic insecurity is rampant. The overall effect is expected to be a growing cultural disparity.

The idea that religiosity arises from the human need for security has also been furthered by studies examining religious beliefs as a compensatory mechanism of control. These studies are motivated by the idea that people are invested in maintaining beliefs in order and structure to prevent beliefs in chaos and randomness.

In the experimental setting, researchers have also tested compensatory control in regard to individuals' perceptions of external systems, such as religion or government. For example, Kay and colleagues found that in a laboratory setting, individuals are more likely to endorse broad external systems (e.g., religion or sociopolitical systems) that impose order and control on their lives when they are induced with lowered levels of personal control. In this study, researchers suggest that when a person's personal control is lessened, their motivation to believe in order is threatened, resulting in compensation of this threat through adherence to other external sources of control.

== Psychometric approaches to religion ==
Since the 1960s psychologists of religion have used the methodology of psychometrics to assess ways in which a person may be religious. An example is the Religious Orientation Scale of Allport and Ross, which measures how respondents stand on intrinsic and extrinsic religion as described by Allport. More recent questionnaires include the Age-Universal I-E Scale of Gorsuch and Venable, the Religious Life Inventory of Batson, Schoenrade and Ventis, and the Spiritual Experiences Index-Revised of Genia. The first provides an age-independent measure of Allport and Ross's two religious orientations. The second measures three forms of religious orientation: religion as means (intrinsic), religion as end (extrinsic), and religion as quest. The third assesses spiritual maturity using two factors: Spiritual Support and Spiritual Openness.

=== Religious orientations and religious dimensions ===
Some questionnaires, such as the Religious Orientation Scale, relate to different religious orientations, such as intrinsic and extrinsic religiousness, referring to different motivations for religious allegiance. A rather different approach, taken, for example, by Glock and Stark (1965), has been to list different dimensions of religion rather than different religious orientations, which relates to how an individual may manifest different forms of being religious. Glock and Stark's typology described five dimensions of religion – the doctrinal, the intellectual, the ethical-consequential, the ritual, and the experiential. In later works, these authors subdivided the ritual dimension into devotional and public ritual, and also clarified that their distinction of religion along multiple dimensions was not identical to distinguishing religious orientations. Although some psychologists of religion have found it helpful to take a multidimensional approach to religion for the purpose of psychometric scale design, there has been, as Wulff explains, considerable controversy about whether religion should really be seen as multidimensional.

=== Questionnaires to assess religious experience ===
What is called religious experiences can differ greatly. Some reports exist of supernatural happenings that it would be difficult to explain from a rational, scientific point of view. On the other hand, there also exist the sort of testimonies that simply seem to convey a feeling of peace or oneness – something to which most people, religious or not, may potentially relate. In categorizing religious experiences it is perhaps helpful to look at them as explicable through one of two theories: the objectivist thesis or the subjectivist thesis.

An objectivist would argue that the religious experience is a proof of God's existence. However, others have criticised the reliability of religious experiences. The English philosopher Thomas Hobbes asked how it was possible to tell the difference between talking to God in a dream, and dreaming about talking to God.

The Subjectivist view argues that it is not necessary to think of religious experiences as evidence for the existence of an actual being whom we call God. From this point of view, the important thing is the experience itself and the effect that it has on the individual.

== Developmental approaches to religion ==
Many have looked at stage models, like those of Jean Piaget and Lawrence Kohlberg, to explain how children develop ideas about God and religion in general.

=== James Fowler's model ===
The best-known stage model of spiritual or religious development is that of James W. Fowler, a developmental psychologist at the Candler School of Theology, in his Stages of Faith. He follows Piaget and Kohlberg and has proposed a holistic staged development of faith (or spiritual development) across the lifespan. These stages of faith development were along the lines of Piaget's theory of cognitive development and Kohlberg's stages of moral development.

Fowler's model has inspired a considerable body of empirical research into faith development, although little of such research was ever conducted by Fowler himself. Gary Leak applied factor analysis to his Faith Development Scale (FDS). In 2003, Timothy Paul Jones developed the Fowlerian Stage-Development Survey (FSDS) and argued that Fowler's stages of faith do not correlate positively with evangelicals' self-perceived faith development.

=== Other hypotheses ===
Other theorists in developmental psychology have suggested that religiosity comes naturally to young children. Specifically, children may have a natural-born conception of mind-body dualism, which lends itself to beliefs that the mind may live on after the body dies. In addition, children have a tendency to see agency and human design where there is not, and prefer a creationist explanation of the world even when raised by parents who do not.

Researchers have also investigated attachment system dynamics as a predictor of the religious conversion experience throughout childhood and adolescence. One hypothesis is the correspondence hypothesis, which posits that individuals with secure parental attachment are more likely to experience a gradual conversion experience. Under the correspondence hypothesis, internal working models of a person's attachment figure is thought to perpetuate his or her perception of God as a secure base. Another hypothesis relating attachment style to the conversion experience is the compensation hypothesis, which states that individuals with insecure attachments are more likely to have a sudden conversion experience as they compensate for their insecure attachment relationship by seeking a relationship with God. Researchers have tested these hypotheses using longitudinal studies and individuals' self narratives of their conversion experience. For example, one study investigating attachment styles and adolescent conversions at Young Life religious summer camps resulted in evidence supporting the correspondence hypothesis through analysis of personal narratives and a prospective longitudinal follow-up of Young Life campers, with mixed results for the compensation hypothesis.

James Alcock summarizes a number of components of what he calls the "God engine", a "number of automatic processes and cognitive biases [that] combine to make supernatural belief the automatic default." These include magical thinking, agency detection, theory of mind that leads to dualism, the notion that "objects and events [serve] an intentional purpose", etc.

== Evolutionary and cognitive psychology of religion ==
Evolutionary psychology is based on the hypothesis that, just as the cardiac, pulmonary, urinary, and immune systems, cognition has a functional structure with a genetic basis, and therefore appeared through natural selection. Like other organs and tissues, this functional structure should be universally shared among humans and should solve important problems of survival and reproduction. Evolutionary psychologists seek to understand cognitive processes by understanding the survival and reproductive functions they might serve, and with this lens, apply the same concept to religion. With regard to religion, this is the investigation of the evolutionary psychology of religion.

Pascal Boyer is one of the leading figures in the cognitive psychology of religion. This is a relatively new field of enquiry with roots in the 1970s. This look at the psychological processes that underlie religious thought and practice. In his book Religion Explained, Boyer shows that there is no simple explanation for religious consciousness. Boyer is mainly concerned with explaining the various psychological processes involved in the acquisition and transmission of ideas concerning the gods. Boyer builds on the ideas of cognitive anthropologists Dan Sperber and Scott Atran, who first argued that religious cognition represents a by-product of various evolutionary adaptations, including folk psychology, and purposeful violations of innate expectations about how the world is constructed (for example, bodiless beings with thoughts and emotions) that make religious cognitions striking and memorable.

Religious persons acquire religious ideas and practices through social exposure. The child of a Zen Buddhist will not become an evangelical Christian or a Zulu warrior without the relevant cultural experience. While mere exposure does not cause a particular religious outlook (a person may have been raised a Roman Catholic but leave the church), nevertheless some exposure seems required – this person will never invent Roman Catholicism out of thin air. Boyer says cognitive science can help us to understand the psychological mechanisms that account for these manifest correlations and in so doing enable us to better understand the nature of religious belief and practice.

Boyer moves outside the leading currents in mainstream cognitive psychology and suggests that we can use evolutionary biology to unravel the relevant mental architecture. Our brains are, after all, biological objects, and the best naturalistic account of their development in nature is Darwin's theory of evolution. To the extent that mental architecture exhibits intricate processes and structures, it is plausible to think that this is the result of evolutionary processes working over vast periods of time. Like all biological systems, the mind is optimised to promote survival and reproduction in the evolutionary environment. On this view all specialised cognitive functions broadly serve those reproductive ends.

For Steven Pinker, the universal propensity toward religious belief is a genuine scientific puzzle. He thinks that adaptationist explanations for religion do not meet the criteria for adaptations. An alternative explanation is that religious psychology is a by-product of many parts of the mind that originally evolved for other purposes.

== Religion and prayer ==
Religious practice often manifests itself in some form of prayer. Recent studies have focused specifically on the effects of prayer on health. Measures of prayer and the above measures of spirituality evaluate different characteristics and should not be considered synonymous.

Prayer is fairly prevalent in the United States. About 55% of Americans report praying daily. However, the practice of prayer is more prevalent and practiced more consistently among Americans who perform other religious practices. There are four primary types of prayer in the West. Poloma and Pendleton, utilized factor analysis to delineate these four types of prayer: meditative (more spiritual, silent thinking), ritualistic (reciting), petitionary (making requests to God), and colloquial (general conversing with God). Further scientific study of prayer using factor analysis has revealed three dimensions of prayer. Ladd and Spilka's first factor was awareness of self, inward reaching. Their second and third factors were upward reaching (toward God) and outward reaching (toward others). This study appears to support the contemporary model of prayer as connection (whether to the self, higher being, or others).

Dein and Littlewood (2008) suggest that an individual's prayer life can be viewed on a spectrum ranging from immature to mature. A progression on the scale is characterized by a change in the perspective of the purpose of prayer. Rather than using prayer as a means of changing the reality of a situation, a more mature individual will use prayer to request assistance in coping with immutable problems and draw closer to God or others. This change in perspective has been shown to be associated with an individual's passage through adolescence.

Prayer appears to have health implications. Empirical studies suggest that mindfully reading and reciting the Psalms (from scripture) can help a person calm down and focus. Prayer is also positively correlated with happiness and religious satisfaction. A study conducted by Francis, Robbins, Lewis, and Barnes investigated the relationship between self-reported prayer frequency and measures of psychoticism and neuroticism according to the abbreviated form of the Revised Eysenck Personality Questionnaire (EPQR-A). The study included a sample size of 2306 students attending Protestant and Catholic schools in the highly religious culture of Northern Ireland. The data shows a negative correlation between prayer frequency and psychoticism. The data also shows that, in Catholic students, frequent prayer has a positive correlation to neuroticism scores. Ladd and McIntosh suggest that prayer-related behaviors, such as bowing the head and clasping the hands together in an almost fetal position, are suggestive of "social touch" actions. Prayer in this manner may prepare an individual to carry out positive pro-social behavior after praying, due to factors such as increased blood flow to the head and nasal breathing. Overall, slight health benefits have been found fairly consistently across studies.

Three main pathways to explain this trend have been offered: placebo effect, focus and attitude adjustment, and activation of healing processes. These offerings have been expanded by Breslin and Lewis (2008) who have constructed a five pathway model between prayer and health with the following mediators: physiological, psychological, placebo, social support, and spiritual. The spiritual mediator is a departure from the rest in that its potential for empirical investigation is not currently feasible. Although the conceptualizations of chi, the universal mind, divine intervention, and the like breach the boundaries of scientific observation, they are included in this model as possible links between prayer and health so as to not unnecessarily exclude the supernatural from the broader conversation of psychology and religion.

== Religion and ritual ==
Another significant form of religious practice is ritual. Religious rituals encompass a wide array of practices, but can be defined as the performance of similar actions and vocal expressions based on prescribed tradition and cultural norms.

Scheff suggests that ritual provides catharsis, emotional purging, through distancing. This emotional distancing enables an individual to experience feelings with an amount of separation, and thus with less intensity. However, the conception of religious ritual as an interactive process has since matured and become more scientifically established. From this view, ritual offers a means to catharsis through behaviors that foster connection with others, allowing for emotional expression. This focus on connection contrasts to the separation that seems to underlie Scheff's view.

Additional research suggests a social component of ritual. For instance, findings suggest that ritual performance indicates group commitment and prevents the uncommitted from gaining membership benefits. Ritual may aid in emphasizing moral values that serve as group norms and regulate societies. It may also strengthen commitment to moral convictions and the likelihood of upholding these social expectations. Thus, performance of rituals may foster social-group stability.

Robert Sapolsky sees a similarity between the rituals accompanying obsessive–compulsive disorder and religious rituals. According to him, religious ritual reduces the tension and anxiety associated with the disorder and provides relief resulting from practicing in a social community.

== Religion and personal functioning ==
=== Religion and health ===
There is considerable literature on the relationship between religion and health. More than 3000 empirical studies have examined relationships between religion and health, including more than 1200 in the 20th century, and more than 2000 additional studies between 2000 and 2009.

Psychologists consider that religion may benefit both physical and mental health in various ways, including encouraging healthy lifestyles, providing social support networks and encouraging an optimistic outlook on life; prayer and meditation may also benefit physiological functioning. Nevertheless, religion is not a unique source of health and well-being, and there are benefits to nonreligiosity as well. Haber, Jacob and Spangler have considered how different dimensions of religiosity may relate to health benefits in different ways.

=== Religion and personality ===
Some studies have examined whether there is a "religious personality." Research on the five factor model of personality suggests that people who identify as religious are more likely to be agreeable and conscientious. Similarly, people who identify as spiritual are more likely to be extrovert and open, although this varies based on the type of spirituality endorsed. For example, people endorsing fundamentalist religious beliefs are more likely to measure low on the Openness factor.

=== Religion and prejudice ===
To investigate the salience of religious beliefs in establishing group identity, researchers have also conducted studies looking at religion and prejudice. Some studies have shown that greater religious attitudes may be significant predictors of negative attitudes towards racial or social outgroups. These effects are often conceptualized under the framework of intergroup bias, where religious individuals favor members of their ingroup (ingroup favoritism) and exhibit disfavor towards members of their outgroup (outgroup derogation). Evidence supporting religious intergroup bias has been supported in multiple religious groups, including non-Christian groups (after all, religion is not only related to Christianity, but others like Islamism, Buddhism, Paganism, and more), and is thought to reflect the role of group dynamics in religious identification. Many studies regarding religion and prejudice implement religious priming both in the laboratory and in naturalistic settings with evidence supporting the perpetuation of ingroup favoritism and outgroup derogation in individuals who are high in religiosity.

Recently, reparative or conversion therapy, a religiously motivated process intended to change an individual's sexuality, has been the subject of scrutiny and has been condemned by some governments, LGBT charities, and therapy/counselling professional bodies.

== Religion and drugs ==
The American psychologist James H. Leuba (1868–1946), in A Psychological Study of Religion, accounts for mystical experience psychologically and physiologically, pointing to analogies with certain drug-induced experiences. Leuba argued forcibly for a naturalistic treatment of religion, which he considered to be necessary if religious psychology were to be looked at scientifically. Shamans all over the world and in different cultures have traditionally used drugs, especially psychedelics, for their religious experiences. In these communities the absorption of drugs leads to dreams (visions) through sensory distortion. The psychedelic experience is often compared to non-ordinary forms of consciousness such as those experienced in meditation, and mystical experiences. Ego dissolution is often described as a key feature of the psychedelic experience.

William James was also interested in mystical experiences from a drug-induced perspective, leading him to make some experiments with nitrous oxide and even peyote. He concludes that while the revelations of the mystic hold true, they hold true only for the mystic; for others they are certainly ideas to be considered, but hold no claim to truth without personal experience of such.

== Religion and mental illness ==
Although many researchers have brought evidence for a positive role that religion plays in health, others have shown that religious beliefs, practices, and experiences may be linked to mental illnesses of various kinds (mood disorders, personality disorders, and psychiatric disorders).

In 2012 a team of psychiatrists, behavioral psychologists, neurologists, and neuropsychiatrists from the Harvard Medical School published research which suggested the development of a new diagnostic category of psychiatric disorders related to religious delusion and hyperreligiosity. They compared the thoughts and behaviors of the most important figures in the Bible (Abraham, Moses, Jesus Christ, and Paul) with patients affected by mental disorders related to the psychotic spectrum using different clusters of disorders and diagnostic criteria (DSM-IV-TR), and concluded that these Biblical figures "may have had psychotic symptoms that contributed inspiration for their revelations", such as schizophrenia, schizoaffective disorder, manic depression, delusional disorder, delusions of grandeur, auditory-visual hallucinations, paranoia, Geschwind syndrome (Paul especially), and abnormal experiences associated with temporal lobe epilepsy (TLE). The authors suggest that Jesus sought to condemn himself to death ("suicide by proxy").

The research went further and also focused on social models of psychopathology, analyzing new religious movements and charismatic cult leaders such as David Koresh, leader of the Branch Davidians, and Marshall Applewhite, founder of the Heaven's Gate cult. The researchers concluded that "If David Koresh and Marshall Applewhite are appreciated as having psychotic-spectrum beliefs, then the premise becomes untenable that the diagnosis of psychosis must rigidly rely upon an inability to maintain a social group. A subset of individuals with psychotic symptoms appears able to form intense social bonds and communities despite having an extremely distorted view of reality. The existence of a better socially functioning subset of individuals with psychotic-type symptoms is corroborated by research indicating that psychotic-like experiences, including both bizarre and non-bizarre delusion-like beliefs, are frequently found in the general population. This supports the idea that psychotic symptoms likely lie on a continuum."

== Religion and psychotherapy ==
Clients' religious beliefs are increasingly being considered in psychotherapy with the goal of improving service and effectiveness of treatment. A resulting development was theistic psychotherapy. Conceptually, it consists of theological principles, a theistic view of personality, and a theistic view of psychotherapy. Following an explicit minimizing strategy, therapists attempt to minimize conflict by acknowledging their religious views while being respectful of client's religious views. This is argued to up the potential for therapists to directly utilize religious practices and principles in therapy, such as prayer, forgiveness, and grace. In contrast to such an approach, psychoanalyst Robin S. Brown argues for the extent to which our spiritual commitments remain unconscious. Drawing from the work of Jung, Brown suggests that "our biases can only be suspended in the extent to which they are no longer our biases".

=== Pastoral psychology ===
One application of the psychology of religion is in pastoral psychology, the use of psychological findings to improve the pastoral care provided by pastors and other clergy, especially in how they support ordinary members of their congregations. Pastoral psychology is also concerned with improving the practice of chaplains in healthcare and in the military. One major concern of pastoral psychology is to improve the practice of pastoral counseling. Pastoral psychology is a topic of interest for professional journals such as the Journal of Psychology and Christianity and the Journal of Psychology and Theology. In 1984, Thomas Oden severely criticized mid-20th-century pastoral care and the pastoral psychology that guided it as having entirely abandoned its classical/traditional sources, and having become overwhelmingly dominated by modern psychological influences from Freud, Rogers, and others. More recently, others have described pastoral psychology as a field that experiences a tension between psychology and theology.

== See also ==
- Attachment theory and psychology of religion
- Fear of God
- Issues in Science and Religion
- Magical thinking
- Mythopoeic thought
- Need for cognitive closure
- Philosophy of religion
- Psychology of religion journals
  - International Journal for the Psychology of Religion
- Science and religion
- Scrupulosity
