= Alan Gregg =

Alan Gregg may refer to:

- Alan Gregg (physician) (1890–1957), American physician and Rockefeller Foundation officer
- Alan Gregg (musician), New Zealand musician
- Allan Gregg, Canadian political pundit
