= JUPA Psychology Proficiency Test =

JUPA Psychology Proficiency Test (心理学検定, Shinri gaku Kentei) is a test designed to measure the takers knowledge of psychology by Japanese Union of Psychological Association.

The first JUPA Psychology Proficiency Test was held in 2008.

== Content ==
The JUPA Psychology Proficiency Test evaluates an individual's knowledge and skills in psychological tasks, often attained through university education. It comprises ten modules, which are graded based on performance. Grade 2 requires passing at least three modules, including two from Category A. Grade 1 necessitates passing six modules with four from Category A and achieving an overall passing grade; and Upper Grade 1 requires the successful completion of all ten modules. Each module features twenty multiple-choice questions.

== Result ==
As a result of the test, the examinees receive a Pass/Fail result, with the standard score (M=50, SD=10).

== Subjects ==
[Category A]

1. Principle, Research methods, and History．

2. Learning, Cognition, and Perception.

3. Developmental psychology and Educational psychology

4. Social psychology, Feeling and character

5. Clinical psychology

[Category B]

6. Neuropsychology and Psychophysiology

7. Statistics

8. Industrial and Organizational psychology

9. Health psychology and Human Services psychology

10. Criminal psychology and Psychology of delinquency

== Merit ==
Examinees who pass Grade 2 can be admitted as a member of several professional bodies after passing the Grade 2 examination.

- The Japan Association of Applied Psychology
- The Japanese Association of Counseling Science
- The Japanese Association of Health Psychology
