= World Perspectives =

Book series edited by Ruth Nanda Anshen

World Perspectives is a scholarly book series edited by Ruth Nanda Anshen and published by Harper & Row.

Number indicates order in series.

1. Approaches to God by Jacques Maritain
2. Accent on Form by Lancelot Law Whyte
3. Scope of Total Architecture by Walter Gropius
4. Recovery of Faith by Sarvepalli Radhakrishnan
5. World Indivisible, With Liberty and Justice for All by Konrad Adenauer
6. Society and Knowledge by Vere Gordon Childe
7. The Transformations of Man by Lewis Mumford
8. Man and Materialism by Fred Hoyle
9. The Art of Loving by Erich Fromm
10. Dynamics of Faith by Paul Tillich
11. Matter, Mind and Man: The Biology of Human Nature by Edmund W. Sinnott
12. Mysticism: Christian and Buddhist by D. T. Suzuki
13. Man's Western Quest by Denis de Rougemont
14. American Humanism by Howard Mumford Jones
15. The Meeting of Love and Knowledge: Perennial Wisdom by Martin D'Arcy
16. Rich Lands and Poor by Gunnar Myrdal
17. Hinduism: Its Meaning for the Liberation of the Spirit by Swami Nikhilananda
18. Can People Learn to Learn? by Brock Chisholm
19. Physics and Philosophy by Werner Heisenberg
20. Art and Reality: ways of the creative process by Joyce Cary
21. Sigmund Freud's Mission: An Analysis of His Personality and Influence by Erich Fromm
22. Mirage of Health: Utopias, Progress & Biological Change by René J. Dubos
23. Issues of Freedom: Paradoxes and Promises by Herbert J. Muller
24. Humanism: The Greek ideal and its survival (Harper Colophon books) by Moses Hadas
25. Life, Its Dimensions and Its Bounds by Robert M. MacIver
26. Challenge of Psychical Research: A Primer of Parapsychology by Gardner Murphy
27. Alfred North Whitehead; his reflections on man and nature by Ruth Nanda Anshen
28. The Age of Nationalism: The First Era of Global History by Hans Kohn
29. Voices of Man by Mario Andrew Pei
30. New Paths in Biology by Adolf Portmann
31. Myth and Reality by Mircea Eliade
32. History as Art and as Science: Twin Vistas on the Past by H. Stuart Hughes
33. Realism in Our Time by György Lukács
34. The Meaning of the Twentieth Century: The Great Transition by Kenneth E. Boulding
35. On Economic Knowledge by Adolph Lowe
36. Caliban Reborn: Renewal in Twentieth-century Music by Wilfrid Howard Mellers
37. Through the Vanishing Point: Space in Poetry and Painting by Marshall McLuhan
38. The Revolution of Hope: Toward a Humanized Technology. by Erich Fromm
39. Emergency Exit by Ignazio Silone
40. Marxism and the Existentialists by Raymond Aron
41. Physical Control of the Mind by José Manuel Rodriguez Delgado
42. Physics and Beyond by Werner Heisenberg
43. On Caring by Milton Mayeroff
44. Deschooling Society by Ivan Illich
45. Revolution Through Peace by Dom Helder Camara
46. Man Unfolding by Jonas Salk
47. Tools for Conviviality by Ivan Illich
48. Across the Frontier by Werner Heisenberg
49. Evil and World Order by William Irwin Thompson
50. To Have or to Be? by Erich Fromm
51. Energy and Equity by Ivan Illich
52. Letters From the Field, 1925-1975 by Margaret Mead
53. In the Centre of Immensities by Bernard Lovell
54. Hope and History, an Exploration by Morton Smith
