= Social character =

Basic concept of analytic social psychology

The social character is the central basic concept of the analytic social psychology of Erich Fromm.

== Overview ==
The concept describes the formation of the shared character structure of the people of a society or a social class according to their way of life and the socially typical expectations and functional requirements regarding socially adaptive behavior. Social character is essentially adaptive to the dominant mode of production in a society. According to Fromm, the concept integrates Marx's theory concerning how the mode of production determines ideology with Freud's concept of character.

While individual character describes the richness of the character structure of an individual, the social character describes the emotional attitudes common to people in a social class or society. The social character is acquired substantially in the family as an agent of the society but also developed in other institutions of society such as schools and workplaces. The function of the social character is to motivate people to accomplish the expected social tasks concerning work and interaction, education and consuming. Arising in the interaction of the socio-economic social structure and the social libidinous structure the social character makes it possible to use human energies as a socially productive resource.

Erich Fromm emphasizes the social necessities, which must be obeyed by the members of a society. So that a society functions adequately, their members must acquire a character structure which enables them to do what they need to do in order to prosper. It is for example expected in an authoritarian society that people are motivated to subordinate themselves to a hierarchy and fulfill selflessly the instructions brought to them. In peasant society, people are socialized to save and to work independently. However, in the permissive consumer culture people are socialized to consume gladly and extensively.

Thus the character structure in every society is formed in such a way that people can fulfill expectations quasi voluntarily. Although everyone develops character traits and character orientations that distinguish them from people who live in other cultures, people in every culture with the same mode of production share basic elements of the social character.

As a theorist of the society Fromm is not interested in the peculiarities by which the individual persons distinguish themselves from each other but he asks what is common to most people in their psychological reactions. So he examines the part of the character structure which is shared by most members of a society. Fromm describes this general core in the character as social character. The figuration of the social character takes place in most societies at cost of the spontaneity and freedom of the individuals.

== Literature ==
- Fromm, Erich (1942). Character and Social Process. An Appendix to Fear of Freedom, Routledge.
- Fromm, Erich (1994). "Appendix: Character and the social process". In Escape from Freedom. New York: Henry Holt and Company, pp. 275–296. ISBN 0805031499.
- Fromm, Erich and Michael Maccoby (1996). Social Character in a Mexican Village. New Brunswick: Transaction Publisher. ISBN 1560008768.
- Jensen, Walter A. (2017). "What is social character?" In Erich Fromm's contributions to sociological theory. Kalamazoo, MI: Printmill, pp. 59–172. ISBN 978-0970491947.
