= Attachment theory and psychology of religion =

Research area

Attachment theory and psychology of religion research explores the ways that a belief in God can fulfill the criteria of an attachment figure and examines how individual differences in attachment lead to correspondence or compensation pathways.

== Introduction to attachment theory ==
Attachment theory began with evolutionary psychologist John Bowlby in 1969. Attachment theory was initially grounded in the observation that human beings appear to be born with an innate psychobiological system (the "attachment behavioral system") that motivates them to seek proximity to significant others (attachment figures). This revolutionary theory has found application in topics such as friendships, romantic relationships, coping with stress, loneliness and grief.

Bowlby’s theory proposes that humans and other primates maintain proximity between individuals and their attachment figures through the evolutionary processes of natural selection and cybernetics. In cybernetics, the system monitors proximity to the primary caregiver, friends, pets, romantic partners and compares it to the desired level of proximity. If the attachment figure is regarded as unavailable or not near enough, attachment behaviors are activated and deactivated when the attachment figure becomes sufficient.

On the "flip side" of attachment is the exploration system. When the exploration system is activated, the attachment system is deactivated. While the attachment system keeps the primary caregiver, adult romantic partner, pets or friends in close proximity, the exploration system allows for acquiring and practicing new skills while exploring the environment. These two functions are crucial in defining and distinguishing attachment relationships from other types of interpersonal relationships. Insecurely attached individuals either defensively minimize closeness seeking behaviors or maximize behaviors to become closer to attachment figure. These two behaviors can be conceptualized as avoidant attachment (the extent to which a person distrusts attachment figure and strives to maintain behavioral independence and emotional distance) and anxious attachment (the degree to which a person worries that an attachment figure will not be available partly because the anxiously attached person doubts his or her own lovability and value).

== Belief in God as an attachment figure ==
Psychoanalysis has a long history of conceptualizing religious belief in terms of relationship between the self and others. A religious believer's perception that they have a relationship with a deity or God leaves open the question of whether such a relationship is an attachment relation. It is easy to draw analogies between beliefs about God and mental models of attachment figures, but it is a difficult distinction to make that God "really" can be an attachment figure. In addition, research has shown that adult attachments and attachment to a belief in God are fundamentally distinct phenomenon, for instance Simon and Low (2003). Kirkpatrick suggests that for many people in many religions, the attachment system is fundamentally involved in their thinking, beliefs, and reasoning about their idea of a God and their relationship to that belief. According to this theory our knowledge of how attachment processes work in non-religious relationships should prove useful in understanding the ways in which people understand belief in God and interact with that belief.

=== Seeking and maintaining proximity to the belief in God ===
One biological function of the attachment system, according to Bowlby, is to maintain proximity between a person and an attachment figure. Religions provide many ways that believers can maintain closeness to their idea of God. Most theistic traditions describe their theory of God as being omnipresent, that is, is all places at all times, and while this is a key aspect of religion that creates closeness to their theory of God, it is not the only way. Virtually all religions have a place or building in which believers come to worship and be closer to their deity or God. Within these places of worship, as well as outside of them, there is an array of idols and symbols; such as artwork, jewelry, and images of crosses that serve to remind believers of their God's closeness. Granqvist and Kirkpatrick suggest that prayer is the most important way that believers maintain proximity to their idea of God.

=== Belief in God as haven of safety ===
Another function of the attachment system, according to Bowlby, is the attachment figure serving as a haven of safety in times of danger or threat. Bowlby also described three situations that activate the attachment behaviors: (1) frightening or alarming environmental events; (2) illness, injury or fatigue; and (3) separation or threat of separation from attachment figure.

=== Belief in God as secure base ===
A "secure base" provides security for exploration in one's environment. By most definitions God is omnipresent, omnipotent, and omniscient. Bowlby described a secure base and its psychological effects as this, "When an individual is confident that an attachment figure will be available to him whenever he desires it, that person will be much less prone to either intense or chronic fear than will an individual who for any reason has no such confidence." It is easy to see how a belief in God would be the most secure of secure bases.

In religious scripture God is often described as by one's side, one's rock and fortress, one's strength, and many other terms that reflect an attachment relationship. Research done by Myers (1992), as mentioned by Granqvist and Kirkpatrick, on the psychological outcomes associated with "attachment to God" (such as religious faith giving believers a sense of optimism and hope for the future) suggest that at least some forms of religiousness are associated with the kind of confident, self-assured approach to life that a secure base is thought to provide.

=== Responses to separation and loss ===
Ainsworth (1985), as mentioned by Granqvist and Kirkpatrick, outlines the fourth and fifth defining criteria of attachment as concern responses to separation from, or loss of, the attachment figure per se: The threat of separation causes anxiety in the attached person, and loss of the attachment figure causes grief. Because of their theory of God's perceived omnipresence, it is difficult to determine whether their God meets these criteria. Believers do not lose a relationship with God as a human relationship. There are instances in religious life when believers are unable to experience their God as they did at some point in their life. In most Christian belief systems, separation from their God is the very essence of hell.

=== Perceiving a theory of God as stronger and wiser ===
Bowlby further described an "attachment relationship" as a weaker, less competent individual having another individual that he or she perceives as stronger and wiser, but this is now known to be wrong, as research has identified that adult attachments include friendships, romantic relationships and even pets in which the reciprocal partner, be it human or non-human, is not necessarily perceived as stronger or wiser.

== Individual differences ==
Individual differences in attachment security often affect the output of the attachment system in human relationships. In the same way, they often modify the effects of attachment processes in the context of believers' perceived relationships with their theory of God. Two general hypotheses have been suggested and are seen as describing two distinct developmental pathways in religion—the compensation hypothesis and the correspondence hypothesis.

=== Compensation pathway ===
The compensation pathway is related to the regulation of distress following experiences with insensitive caregivers. This situation describes a negative answer to the question of whether an attachment figure is sufficiently near, attentive, responsive, and approving. According to the attachment theory this situation activates attachment behaviors to restore an adequate degree of proximity, but under certain condition the individual may anticipate that their efforts are unlikely to be successful. Bowlby described what is likely to happen if such a case occurs, "Whenever the natural object of attachment behavior is unavailable, the behavior can become directed towards some substitute object. Even though it is inanimate, such an object frequently appears capable of filling the role of an important, though subsidiary, attachment 'figure.' Like the principal attachment figure, the inanimate substitute is sought especially when a child is tired, ill or distressed".

Granqvist and others suggest that people should also be able to turn to their belief in God as a substitute attachment-like figure under such conditions. The compensation pathway's focus is on the degree to which experiences with insensitive caregivers and/or attachment insecurities are associated with use of an idea of God and religion to regulate attachment-related distress.

Studies on attachment and religion have been ambiguous with no clear findings. According to Hall, Fukujima and Delaney after an independent review of literature: "On the surface, it appears that the empirical literature to date presents a rather inconsistent picture." The same authors in 2010 found that the compensation model was not supported, and insecure individuals high in parental insensitivity were not more religious.

Hagekull and Granqvist in 2001 found that childhood insecure attachment to a mother were strongly related to holding positive beliefs about astrology, the occult, parapsychology and UFOs in a Swedish sample. Since these New Age beliefs, such as parapsychology or astrology are unrelated to a personal God, these results argue against the model that insecure individuals adopt concepts involving a belief in a personal loving God to compensate for inadequate childhood relationships.

Granqvist and Kirkpatrick found that people who had sudden conversions to religion not only outscored non-converts in parental insensitivity but also outscored individuals who had experienced a more gradual increase in religiousness, however, the same authors have also found that people who suddenly de-converted from a religion, such as agnostics and atheists also scored higher in childhood insecure attachments to a mother or father. Similarly to insecure parental attachment, insecure romantic attachment predicts sudden religious conversions and de-conversions. ---

=== Correspondence pathway ===
Bowlby suggests attachment patterns continue across time partly because the way a person sees themselves and others (internal working model) guides behavioral, emotional, and cognitive responses in social interactions over the life span. The correspondence hypothesis suggests individual differences in religious beliefs and experience should correspond with individual differences in the internal working models and attachment patterns. This theory suggests a "secure" IWM of self and others predicts viewing God as supporting. A person with a preoccupied or anxious attachment may be expected to have a deeply emotional, grasping relationship with their idea of God, while a person with an avoidant attachment would be expected to view a God as remote or inaccessible.

The correspondence hypothesis suggests securely attached people would be expected to reflect the religious standards while insecurely attached people would not be expected to reflect their attachment figure's religious standards. People who report being more cared for by parents score higher on measures of religiousness, but only if their parents also displayed high levels of religiosity. Another study found that such people had a higher assessed religiosity as socially rooted in the parental relationship. This aspect of the correspondence hypothesis, that is, people reflecting attachment figure's religious standards, can be called "social correspondence".

== See also ==
- Attachment theory
- Psychology of religion
