= The Art of Loving =

1956 philosophy book by Erich Fromm

- Cover of the first edition
- Author: Erich Fromm
- Language: English
- Publisher: Harper & Brothers
- Publication date: 1956
- Media type: Print
- Pages: 133

The Art of Loving is a 1956 book by psychoanalyst and social philosopher Erich Fromm. It was originally published as part of the World Perspectives series edited by Ruth Nanda Anshen. In this work, Fromm develops his perspective on human nature from his earlier works, Escape from Freedom and Man for Himself – principles which he revisits in many of his other major works. He criticizes the popular conception of love and asserts that "love is the only provision for a sane and satisfying human existence".

== Background ==
In 1930, Fromm was recruited to the Frankfurt School by Max Horkheimer. Fromm played a central role in the early development of the school. He left the school in the late 1930s, following a "bitter and contentious" deterioration in his relationship with Horkheimer and Theodor Adorno. In 1956, the year The Art of Loving was released, Fromm's relationship with Herbert Marcuse, also a member of the Frankfurt School, also deteriorated. Dissent published a debate between the two, and though later scholars would come to view Marcuse's arguments as being weaker than Fromm's, Marcuse's were better received within their lifetimes, and Fromm's reputation and in leftist circles was permanently damaged.

The book was inspired by Fromm's "new, liberating feeling of life’s possibility" when he courted Annis, his wife.

== Summary ==
The Art of Loving is divided across four chapters and a preface; the chapter headings are I. Is Love an Art?, II. The Theory of Love, III. Love and Its Disintegration in Contemporary Western Society, and IV. The Practice of Love. An epigraph consisting of a quote from Paracelsus concerning the relationship between love and knowledge is included in the front matter.

=== Preface ===
In the preface, Fromm states that the book does not provide instruction in what he terms the "art of loving", but rather it argues that love, rather than a sentiment, is an artistic practice. Any attempt to love another is bound to fail, if one does not commit their total personality to learning and practicing loving. He states that "individual love cannot be attained without the capacity to love one's neighbour, without true humility, courage, faith and discipline." He also states that the ideas he expresses in The Art of Loving are similar to those he had already outlined in Escape from Freedom, Man for Himself, and The Sane Society.

=== I. Is Love an Art? ===
Fromm opens the first chapter by critiquing the place of love in Western society. He says that though people think that love is important, they think that there is nothing for them to learn about love, an attitude which Fromm believes is misguided. For Fromm, a major factor in the development of this attitude is that the majority of people "see the problem of love primarily as that of being loved, rather than that of loving, of one's capacity to love." As a result, people become focused on being attractive rather than on loving others, and as a result, what is meant in Western society by "being lovable is essentially a mixture between being popular and having sex appeal".

The second problem Fromm identifies in people's attitudes towards love is that they think of the "problem of love" as that of an "object", rather than a skill. In other words, they believe that to love is simple, but to find the right person to love or be loved by is difficult. He believes that this results in a culture in which human relations of love resemble a labour market, whereby people seek a "bargain" of a romantic partner: one of high social value, who desires them in return, in consideration of the "limitations of their own exchange values."

Fromm also identifies a confusion between the initial experience of 'falling in love', and what he terms 'standing' in love, or the "permanent state of being in love". He says that falling in love is by its very nature not lasting, and so if people have not put in the work in order to stand in love together, as they get "well acquainted, their intimacy loses more and more of its miraculous character, until their antagonism, their disappointments, their mutual boredom kill whatever is left of their initial excitement." Furthermore, people consider the intensity of feeling upon falling in love with someone to be proof of the intensity of their love for each other, when for Fromm, this "may only prove the degree of their preceding loneliness".

Fromm concludes the chapter by stating that there "is hardly any activity, any enterprise, which is started with such tremendous hope and expectations, and yet, which fails so regularly as love." Fromm contends that this is because of the above attitudes to love, and the neglect of love as an art form, which he states means that it consists of both theory and practice. To master love, however, requires more than learning the theory and implementing the practice, but that "the mastery of the art must be a matter of ultimate concern; there must be nothing else in the world more important than the art". He briefly states that though most people crave love, their desire for success, prestige, money, and power, as desired in capitalist society, relegate love to being of lesser importance to them, and that this is why most people fail to truly love others.

=== II. The Theory of Love ===
==== 1. Love, the Answer to the Problem of Human Existence ====
Fromm opens this chapter by stating that "Any theory of love must begin with a theory of man, of human existence." For Fromm, a person's key trait is their ability to reason. Prior to humans developing the ability to reason, we were part of the animal kingdom and in a state of harmony. To recover this state of harmony it is impossible for us to regress to the idyll of the animal kingdom, but rather humanity must progress to a new harmony by developing their ability to reason. This ability to reason makes humanity "life being aware of itself", and separates us from all other creatures. This separation is, for Fromm, "the source of all anxiety". He says that by understanding the story of Adam and Eve, people can understand the barriers to loving connection. For Fromm, when man and woman develop awareness of their difference from each other, they remain strangers, and this is the source of shame, guilt, and anxiety, and it is reunion through love which allows people to overcome this feeling of difference.

For Fromm the fundamental question facing mankind is "the question of how to overcome separateness, how to achieve union, how to transcend one's own individual life and find at-onement". In other words, that people are fundamentally isolated, and seek union with others to overcome this feeling of isolation. He develops this idea, stating that different cultures and religions have had different techniques to achieve this, and gives five examples of how these unions are achieved. He describes "orgiastic states", in which "separateness" is abated by taking drugs, participating in sexual orgies, or both. For Fromm, the problem with this approach is that the feeling of unity is temporary and fleeting.

He proceeds to state that in modern capitalist society, people find union in conformity. The meaning of equality, for Fromm, has been changed from meaning "oneness" to meaning "sameness". The result of pursuing the Enlightenment concept of l'âme n'a pas de sexe (literally, "the soul has no sex") is the disappearance of the polarity of the sexes, and with it, erotic love. He criticises the effect that union by conformity has on people, turning them into "nine to fiver[s]", who sacrifice their fulfillment outside of work by their commitment to filling a labour role.

A third way that Fromm suggests people seek union is through what he terms "Symbiotic union", which he divides into sadism and masochism. In this paradigm, both the masochist and the sadist are dependent on the other, which he believes reduces the integrity of each.

Fromm proposes that the most harmful way people may find union is through domination, which is an extreme form of sadism. He provides the example of a child tearing apart a butterfly to understand how it functions.

Fromm contrasts symbiotic union with mature love, the final way people may seek union, as union in which both partners respect the integrity of the other. Fromm states that "Love is an active power in a man", and that in the general sense, the active character of love is primarily that of "giving". He further delineates what he views as the four core tenets of love: care, responsibility, respect, and knowledge.

He defines love as care by stating that "Love is the active concern for the life and the growth of that which we love", and gives an example of a mother and a baby, saying that nobody would believe the mother loved the baby, no matter what she said, if she neglected to feed it, bathe it, or comfort it. He further says that "One loves that for which one labours, and one labours for that which one loves."

The second principle of love, to Fromm, is responsibility. He contrasts his definition of responsibility with that of duty, stating that responsibility is the voluntary desire to respond to the needs of one's partner. Without his third principle of love, respect, Fromm warns that responsibility can devolve into exploitation. Fromm says that in a loving relationship, people have a responsibility not to exploit their partners. He explains that L'amour est l'enfant de la liberté (literally, "love is the child of liberty"), and that love must desire the growth of the partner as they are, not how one may want them to grow.

As such, for Fromm, "respect is possible only if I have achieved independence". According to Fromm, in order to respect someone we must know them, and so knowledge is his fourth principle of love. For Fromm, attainment of these four attitudes are only possible in the mature person, one "who only wants to have that which he has worked for, who has given up narcissistic dreams of omniscience and omnipotence, who has acquired humility based on the inner strength which only genuine productive activity can give." He concludes the chapter by criticising Sigmund Freud for not understanding sex well enough.

==== 2. Love Between Parents and Child ====
Fromm opens this section by hypothesizing on love through the eyes of a baby in relation to its mother. In this dynamic, the child intuits that "I am loved for what I am", or rather "I am loved because I am". This love is unconditional: "it need not be acquired, it need not be deserved." The unconditional aspect of motherly love, a blessing if present, produces a problem of its own: if this love is absent, there is nothing the child can do to create it. Before growing to the age of between eight and a half to ten, Fromm considers that children experience being loved, but do not themselves begin to love. At this point a child may begin to practice love, for example, by giving a gift to one of their parents.

Fromm states that it takes many years for this form of love to develop into mature love. He contrasts the difference, the primary one being that someone who loves maturely believes that loving is more pleasurable than receiving love. Through practicing love, and thus producing love, the individual overcomes the dependence on being loved, having to be "good" to deserve love. He contrasts the immature phrases "I love because I am loved" and "I love you because I need you" with mature expressions of love, "I am loved because I love", and "I need you because I love you."

He contrasts motherly love with fatherly love. Fromm contends that mothers and fathers represent opposite poles of human existence: the mother represent the natural world, while the father embodies the world of thought, man-made thing, and adventure. Unlike motherly love, fatherly love is conditional for Fromm, it can be earned. Fromm contends that in infancy, people care more about motherly love, while in later childhood they crave fatherly love. Upon reaching maturity, a well-adjusted individual reaches a synthesis of motherly and fatherly love within their own being; they become their own source for both. Fromm believes that receiving an inadequate balance of both motherly and fatherly love results in various forms of neurosis in adults.

==== 3. The Objects of Love ====
Fromm opens this section by stating that it is a fallacy to believe that loving one person and no others is a testament to the intensity of that love. He proposes that one can only truly love an individual if one is capable of loving anyone. In this section Fromm subdivides love into five distinct categories, namely brotherly love, motherly love, erotic love, self-love, and the love of God.

Fromm explains what he calls "paradoxical logic" – the ability to reconcile opposing principles in one same instance. He highlights paradoxical logic in the sections dedicated to the love of God and erotic love.

===== (a) Brotherly Love =====
Brotherly love, for Fromm, is not love between siblings but rather the love one feels for their fellow man, originating in their common experiences of humanity. This is a love between equals, though "even as equals we are not always 'equal'; inasmuch as we are human, we are all in need of help. Today I, Tomorrow you." The beginning of brotherly love is described as love for the helpless, the poor, and the stranger. He compares brotherly love to Exodus 22:21, "You know the heart of the stranger, for you were strangers in the land of Egypt", adding "therefore love the stranger!"

===== (b) Motherly Love =====
In this section Fromm expands his previous description of motherly love to include an element beyond the minimum care and responsibility required to support the child's life and growth. He says that a mother has a responsibility to instill a love for life in her children, and compares these two forms of responsibility to milk and honey. Here milk symbolises the first of the two, the responsibility of care and affirmation. Honey symbolizes the sweetness of life, a love and joy for the experience of living, which only a truly happy mother can instill in her children. Unlike brotherly love (and later, erotic love), motherly love is by its very nature not shared between equals. Fromm states that most mothers succeed at showing motherly love when their children are infants, but the true test of motherly love, for Fromm, is to continue to love as the child grows, matures, and eventually detaches themselves from their reliance on the mother.

===== (c) Erotic Love =====
This section is concerned with romantic love shared between one man and one woman treating each other as equals. Erotic love, for Fromm, is the craving of complete fusion with one other person, and considers sexual union to be a vital part of this fusion. Sex, says Fromm, can be blind and be stimulated by any strong emotion, not only love. When two people who truly love each other have sex, however, the act is devoid of greediness, and is defined by tenderness. Because the notion of sexual desire is often conflated with love in western society, such desire is often mistakenly considered a sign of loving someone. Though having sex with someone can give the illusion of unity, without love this act will leave the participants just as much strangers to each other as before, and can induce feelings of shame or hatred for the other. Fromm criticizes the misinterpretation of the exclusive nature of erotic love as possessive attachment. He states that it is common to find two people who consider themselves to be in love with each other but have no love for anyone else. Fromm considers this an "egotism á deux", as one should love all of mankind through the love of their romantic partner. Fromm concludes the section by criticizing views that love is neither exclusively a feeling nor exclusively an act of will, stating that it is somewhere between the two.

===== (d) Self-Love =====
Fromm begins this section by criticising the "widespread" belief in Western thought that "while it is virtuous to love others, it is sinful to love oneself." He critiques the conclusions of John Calvin and Freud in particular, and states that self-love ought not be confused with either narcissism or the turning inwards of the libido. Fromm claims that it is a logical fallacy to love one's neighbour for the sake of their humanity and not also love one's self for the same reason.

Fromm states that "love of others and love of ourselves are not alternatives. On the contrary, an attitude of love towards themselves will be found in all those who are capable of loving others. Love, in principle, is indivisible as far as the connection between 'objects' and one's own self is concerned. Genuine love is an expression of productiveness and implies care, respect, responsibility and knowledge." By this token, he classifies love as "an active striving for the growth and happiness of the loved person", and so classifies such action as virtuous.

Fromm contends that "love of man" (which is to say the love that one holds for a given individual for the sake of their humanity) does not follow from the love of a specific person, but rather serves as the basis for loving a specific individual. From this assertion, Fromm states that it then follows that the self is as much an object to be loved as any other. He further claims that the individual who can only love others, and not themselves, cannot truly love at all.

Fromm contrasts self-love with selfishness, saying of them that "Selfishness and self-love, far from being identical, are actually opposites." He states that the problem with selfish people is not that they love themselves too much, but rather too little: a lack of fondness and care for themselves, which in turn stems from a lack of productiveness that leaves them feeling empty, frustrated, unhappy, or anxious. For Fromm, "selfish persons are incapable of loving others, but they are not capable of loving themselves either."

Fromm concludes the section by contrasting the selfish person with those who experience "neurotic 'unselfishness'". This unselfishness does not typically trouble the affected party, but rather manifests alongside symptoms such as depression, fatigue, a lack of productiveness, failures in romantic relationships, and others. Fromm states that not only are the neurotically unselfish not troubled by this trait, they may take pride in it, with some considering it their only redeeming character trait. Fromm states that such people may be confused to find that despite their lack of selfishness, they are unhappy, and their relationships to others are unsatisfactory. The remedy, says Fromm, is to view this trait as part of a range of symptoms, the cure to which is resolving the individual’s underlying lack of productivity. He concludes the section with an example of the damaging effects of this unselfish behaviour on others, given in the form of the "unselfish mother", who gives of herself utterly to her children. Fromm states that children raised by neurotically unselfish mothers "do not show the happiness of persons who are convinced they are loved; they are anxious, tense, afraid of the mother's disapproval and anxious to live up to her expectations." He further states that "the effect of the 'unselfish' mother is not too different from that of the selfish one; indeed, it is often worse, because the mother's unselfishness prevents the children from criticising her."

===== (e) Love of God =====
Finally, Fromm comes to love for God, the religious form of love. According to Fromm, the type of gods and the way in which they are loved or worshiped depends on the level of maturity that people have reached, which applies both at the level of society and at the level of the individual.

=== III. Love and its Disintegration in Contemporary Western Society ===
Fromm calls the general idea of love in contemporary Western society égoïsme à deux – a relationship in which each person is entirely focused on the other, to the detriment of other people around them. The current belief is that a couple should be a well-assorted team, sexually and functionally, working towards a common aim. This is in contrast with Fromm's description of true erotic love and intimacy, which involves willful commitment directed toward a single unique individual. One cannot truly love another person if one does not love all of mankind including oneself.

=== IV. The Practice of Love ===
Fromm begins the last chapter, "The Practice of Love", by saying: "[...] many readers of this book, expect to be given prescriptions of 'how to do it to yourself' [...]. I am afraid that anyone who approaches this last chapter in this spirit will be gravely disappointed". He says that in order to master the art of loving, one must practice discipline, concentration, and patience in every facet of one's life.

== Reception ==
The Art of Loving is Fromm's best-selling work, having sold millions of copies. The Washington Post wrote that the book "had an enormous vogue on campuses during the 1960s and Dr. Fromm became something of a cult figure among large numbers of students at that time." It also enhanced the perception of Fromm as a populariser, a writer who simplifies their work to appeal to a broader audience.

At the time of its release, it initiated criticism within leftist circles as not being emancipatory in nature.
