= Character structure =

Personality traits

A character structure is a system of secondary traits manifested in the specific ways that an individual relates and reacts to others, to various kinds of stimuli, and to the environment. A child whose nurture and/or education cause them to have conflict between legitimate feelings, living in an illogical environment and interacting with adults who do not take the long-term interests of the child to heart will be more likely to form these secondary traits. In this manner the child blocks the unwanted emotional reaction that would have normally occurred. Although this may serve the child well while in that dysfunctional environment, it may also cause the child to react in inappropriate ways, by developing alternate ways in which the energy compulsively surfaces, ways damaging to their own interests, when interacting with people in a completely independent environment. Major trauma that occurs later in life, even in adulthood, can sometimes have a profound effect on character. See post-traumatic stress disorder. However, character may also develop in a positive way according to how the individual meets the psychosocial challenges of the life cycle (Erikson).

== Theories ==
=== Freud ===
Freud's first paper on character described the anal character consisting of stubbornness, stinginess, and extreme neatness. He saw this as a reaction formation to the child's having to give up pleasure in anal eroticism. The positive version of this character is the conscientious, inner directed obsessive. Freud also described the erotic character as both loving and dependent. And the narcissistic character as the natural leader, aggressive and independent because of not internalizing a strong super-ego.

=== Fromm ===
For Erich Fromm character develops as the way in which an individual structures modes of assimilation and relatedness. The character types are almost identical to Freud's but Fromm gives them different names: receptive, hoarding, and exploitative. Fromm adds the marketing type to describe individuals who continually adapt the self to succeed in the new service economy. For Fromm, character types can be productive or unproductive. Fromm notes that character structures develop in each individual to enable him or her to interact successfully within a given society and adapt to its mode of production and social norms (see social character), and may be very counter-productive when used in a different society.

Fromm got his ideas about character structure from two associates/students of Freud, Sándor Ferenczi and Wilhelm Reich. It is Reich who really developed the concept from Ferenczi, and added to it an exploration of character structure as it applies to body structure and development as well as mental health

=== Reich ===
For Wilhelm Reich, character structures are based upon blocks—chronic, unconsciously held muscular contractions—against awareness of feelings. The blocks result from trauma: the child learns to limit their awareness of strong feelings as their needs are thwarted by parents who meet cries for fulfillment with neglect or punishment. Reich argued for five basic character structures, each with its own body type developed as a result of the particular blocks created due to deprivation or frustration of the child's stage-specific needs:

1. The schizoid structure, which could result in full blown schizophrenia: this is the result of not feeling wanted by hostile parents, even in the womb. There is a fragmentation of both body and mind with this structure.
2. The oral structure is an adaptation to an early wound of deprivation around the basic need for nourishment from birth to approx. 18 months. The oral structure as an adult will sometimes adopt an attitude of "you do it for me," as a reaction to not having been nurtured when young. At other times the defense is one of compensation where the individual denies their own needs in the belief that needing will result in abandonment. The person loses touch with their healthy natural assertion and aggression and energy tends to collapse and be difficult to sustain. The body adopts a posture where shoulders are usually hunched which contracts the chest and limits breath and therefore the amount of energy the body takes in. The head juts forward, This posture limits energy flow to the arms which then feel weak. The body of the oral structure defends against receiving and thus confirms the belief that they cannot get their needs met, which becomes a self-fulfilling prophecy unless the defense can be challenged in both mind and body and the individual can mobilize their energy, stand on their own two feet and own the right to need and to receive.
3. The psychopath or upwardly displaced structure: this wound, around the age of 3, is around the parent manipulating, emotionally molesting the child by seducing them into feeling "special" for the parent's own narcissistic needs. The child resolves to never again permit themselves to be vulnerable, and so decides to instead manipulate and overpower others with their will. The body is well developed above, weak below, as the psychopath pulls away from the ground and attempts to overpower from above. This structure has variations, depending on the admixture with prior wounds: the overbearing is the pure type, the submissive is mixed with oral, the withdrawing, with schizoid.
4. The masochist structure: this wound occurs when the parent refuses to allow the child to say "no," the first step in setting boundaries. The child seeks relief from the rage that builds up underneath bounded muscle and fat, by provoking punishment from others.
5. The rigid: this wound occurs around the time of the first puberty, the age of 4. The child's sexuality is not affirmed by the parent, but instead shamed or denied. This structure seeks to prove to the parents and others that the child is worthy of love. The rigid structure is often beautifully harmonious, but there is a physical split around the diaphragm between heart and pelvis: love and sex. This person has trouble with being aware of their emotions, which are strong, yet buried. The rigid structure has many substructures, depending on the exact nature of the wound, the admixture with other pre-rigid (oedipal) structures, and the gender: in women, the masculine aggressive, hysterical, and the alternating; in men, the phallic narcissist, the compulsive, and the passive feminine.

While each of these structures has blocks, and these blocks to some degree resemble "armour", it is only the rigid structure that truly has what Reich called "character armour": a system of blocks all over the body. Depending on which version of rigid one is, the rigid character possesses either 'plate' (i.e. clanky) or 'mesh' (much more flexible) character armour.

== See also ==
- Temperament and Character Inventory
