= On Disobedience and Other Essays =

Book by Erich Fromm

- Cover of the first edition
- Author: Erich Fromm
- Language: English
- Publisher: Harper & Row
- Publication date: 1981
- Publication place: United States

On Disobedience and Other Essays is a 1981 book by the psychoanalyst Erich Fromm. Published by Harper & Row, it is a collection of four previously published essays.

- "Let Man Prevail" and "Humanist Socialism" originally appeared in Erich Fromm, Let Man Prevail: A Socialist Manifesto and Program, 1960
- "Disobedience as a Psychological and Moral Problem" originally appeared in Clara Urquhart, A matter of Life, 1963
- "Prophets and Priest" originally appeared in Ralph Schoenman, Bertrand Russell, Philosopher of the Century: Essays in His Honour, 1967
