= Religious orientation =

Classification of personal beliefs

An individual's or community's religious orientation involves presumptions about the existence and nature of God or gods, religious prescriptions about morality and communal and personal spirituality. Such presumptions involve the study of psychology, ethics, sociology and anthropology.

== Psychology ==
According to Whitley and Kite, researchers who were interested in studying the psychological effects of religion on prejudice initially studied the relationship between simple indicators of religiosity such as whether or not a person went to church and the level of prejudice that the person showed. They found that "religious involvement was consistently correlated with a variety of forms of prejudice."

These findings were not well received by religious leaders or the religious community in general. At this point there was a shift in the nature of the research. Instead of being concerned with factors such as church attendance and the quantity of religious involvement, researchers became interested in the quality of religious involvement. As Whitley and Kite said, "These ideas evolved into the concepts of intrinsic and extrinsic religious orientation."

== Measuring ==
In 1967, Gordon Allport and J. M. Ross developed a means of measuring religious orientation. The Extrinsic scale measures extrinsic religious orientation. A sample statement from the scale is "The church is most important as a place to formulate good social relationships". This scale brought forth a lot of interest in religious orientation and much research has been done over the years. As more researchers began studying religious orientation, more problems arose with what the Intrinsic and Extrinsic scales were measuring.

== Extrinsic ==
Extrinsic religious orientation is a method of using religion to achieve non-religious goals, essentially viewing religion as a means to an end. It is used by people who go to religious gatherings and claim certain religious ideologies to establish or maintain social networks while minimally adhering to the teachings of the religion. People high in extrinsic religious orientation are more likely to conform to social norms and demands rather than what the religion requires, and are often prone to use religious beliefs to serve their own political goals. Allport stated that people high in extrinsic religious orientation use religion, "to provide security and solace, sociability and distraction, status and self-justification" (Allport & Ross, 1967, p. 434).

=== Prejudice by extrinsic people ===
In 2005, Hunsberger and Jackson reviewed studies on religious orientation that had taken place since 1990. Links have been made between prejudice and religious orientation, but there has been no agreement on the relationship with intolerance. This is because there are many targets of prejudice, such as race, ethnicity, gender, sexual orientation, and age. Hunsberger and Jackson found support for the idea that the target of prejudice is important when looking at prejudice and religious orientation relationships. They found that extrinsic orientation is positively related to racial or ethnic and gay or lesbian intolerance. People who measure high in extrinsic religious orientation have a utilitarian approach, view religion as a meaningful source of social status, and conform to popular trends, including prejudice. The validity of the religious orientation scales has proven debatable, and relationships to prejudice have either supported or refuted Allport and Ross's theories.

== Intrinsic ==
According to Whitley and Kite, a person with an intrinsic religious orientation sincerely believes in their religion and all or most of its teachings and attempts to live their life as it teaches. This agrees with what Daniel Batson implies; that while a person with an extrinsic religious orientation sees religion as a means to an end, a person with an intrinsic orientation sees their religion as that end. To them their religion is "an active directing force, not just a tool used to reach self-serving ends." Those with this orientation find their religion to be the most important aspect of their life and seek to contextualize other aspects of their life through their religion.

=== Prejudice by intrinsic people ===
Research has found that people who hold an intrinsic religious orientation sincerely believe in and follow the teachings of their religion. They act in accordance with their religion, and as a result those "with a strong internal orientation should be unprejudiced to the extent that their religions teach inter-group tolerance." Studies have found that these people show either no correlation or a negative correlation for racial prejudice. On the other hand, these same people often show a positive correlation for prejudice against gays. This effect may be predicted due to most religions not speaking ill of other races (racism being due to upbringing rather than any Biblical foundation), but viewing homosexuality as behavior the Bible prohibits.

While this research appears more favorable than research that showed a correlation between religious activity and prejudice, some researchers are convinced that these people are merely showing what they believe to be a more socially acceptable bias. Batson tested this hypothesis by having participants in a study (which they were led to believe was about watching and evaluating a movie) choose whether to sit in a theater with a white person or a black one. There were two conditions in this study, an overt condition in which both theaters were showing the same movie and a covert condition in which each theater was showing a different movie. The researchers believed that a prejudiced person who was attempting to appear unprejudiced would sit with the black person when the movie selection was the same in order to appear unprejudiced, but would sit with the white person (participants were white) when their choice could be attributed to wanting to watch the different movie. The researchers found that 75% of intrinsically religious participants chose to sit with the black person in the overt condition, but only 46% choose to sit with the black person in the covert condition. While these results show that intrinsically motivated people want to appear racially unbiased, it also shows that they are not racially prejudiced in general. Contrary to the religious orientations theory, extrinsic religiosity was unrelated to prejudice in either condition.

== Quest orientation ==
A third religious orientation proposed by Batson is the quest orientation. People with this orientation treat their religion not as a means or an end, but a search for truth. As Batson said, "An individual who approaches religion in this way recognizes that he or she does not know, and probably never will know, the final truth about such matters. Still the questions are deemed important, and however tentative and subject to changes, answers are sought."

=== Prejudice by quest oriented people ===
Intuitively, it is logical to assume that people who hold a quest orientation will be low in prejudice because by having this orientation they show they are open-minded and willing to change. This idea was tested alongside the intrinsic and extrinsic orientations by Batson in his theater experiment (see above). People who scored high in quest orientation chose to sit with the black person about half the time in both the overt and covert conditions, indicating both a lack of prejudice and a lack of an attempt to appear unprejudiced. To summarize Whitley and Kite as well as Batson, quest orientation appears to be a source of "universal love and compassion" that has long been sought by both religious scholars and psychology of religion researchers.

=== Examples ===
Examples of people who have attained a quest orientation are Gautama Buddha, Malcolm X, and Mahatma Gandhi.

== See also ==
- Daniel Batson
- Gordon Allport
- Locus of control
- Racism
- Stereotype
- Prejudice
- Psychology of religion
