= Hazel Barnes =

American philosopher, author, and translator

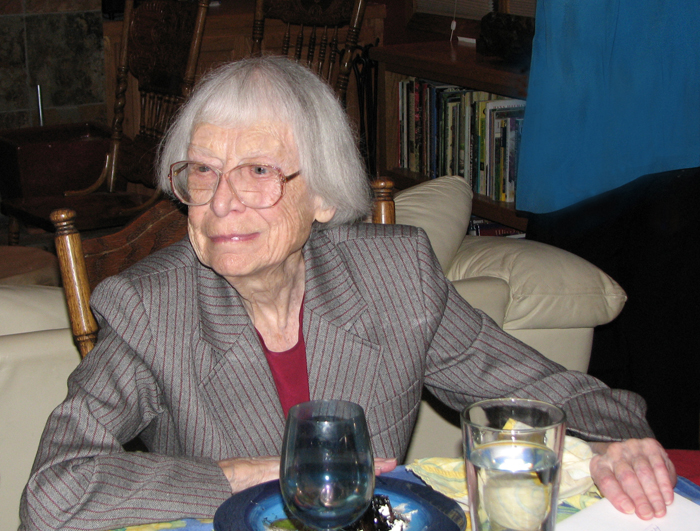
- Barnes at her 92nd Birthday
- Born: Hazel Estella Barnes; December 16, 1915; Wilkes-Barre, Pennsylvania, U.S.
- Died: March 18, 2008 (aged 92); Boulder, Colorado, U.S.
- Occupations: Philosopher, translator
- Known for: English translation of Jean-Paul Sartre's work

Hazel Estella Barnes (December 16, 1915 – March 18, 2008) was an American philosopher, author, and translator. Best known for her popularization of existentialism in America, Barnes translated the works of Jean-Paul Sartre as well as writing original works on the subject.

== Career ==
After earning her Ph.D. in Classics from Yale in 1941, she spent much of her career at the University of Colorado (CU). In 1979, Barnes became the first woman to be named Distinguished Professor at CU. In recognition of her long tenure and service to the University, in 1991 CU established the Hazel Barnes Prize for faculty who best embody "the enriching interrelationship between teaching and research."

In 1962, Barnes was the host of a television series, Self-Encounter: A Study in Existentialism, which ran for 10 episodes and appeared on National Educational Television.

Her autobiography, The Story I Tell Myself : A Venture in Existentialist Autobiography, was published in 1997.

== Translation of Sartre's Being and Nothingness ==
Barnes recounts in her autobiography taking on the 1956 translation of Being and Nothingness unexpectedly. Writing to the main American publisher of existentialist writers with a book proposal on the general topic, Barnes received a reply that included an invitation to engage in the translation. She took the publishers up on the offer, thinking it might be a good way to familiarize herself with Sartre's thought. "I was quite casual about it all", she writes, "[never asking myself] whether with only three years of badly taught high school French and one yearlong course in college, and a bare minimum of background in philosophy, I was qualified to do the task."

== Partial bibliography ==
=== Original works ===
- The Literature of Possibility: a Study in Humanistic Existentialism (1959)
- Hippolytus In Drama And Myth (1960)
- An Existentialist Ethics (1967)
- The University as the New Church (1970)
- Sartre (1973)
- The Meddling Gods: Four Essays on Classical Themes (1974)
- Sartre and Flaubert (1981)
- The Story I Tell Myself : A Venture in Existentialist Autobiography (1997)

=== Translations ===
- Being and Nothingness (1956)
- Existential Psychoanalysis (1962)
- The Problem of Method (1963)
