= The Art of Listening =

1994 book by Erich Fromm

- Author: Erich Fromm
- Language: English
- Subject: Psychology
- Publisher: Constable & Robinson
- Publication date: 1994
- Publication place: United States
- Pages: 204
- ISBN: 9780094738904

The Art of Listening is a 1994 book on psychology by the psychoanalyst Erich Fromm. In the work, Fromm elucidates his therapeutic method of dealing with the psychological sufferings of people in contemporary society. Fromm's work contains a great deal of clinical reflections of the psychoanalyst. In The Art of Listening, Fromm studies the communication between analyst and analysand in which the analyst offers himself as a human being specially trained in the "art of listening." The art of therapy is the art of listening.

In The Art of Listening, Fromm suggests that a person's character orientation results from socialization into shared psychic attitudes of a particular society.
