= To Have or to Be? =

1976 book by Erich Fromm

To Have or To Be?
- First edition
- Author: Erich Fromm
- Language: English
- Published: 1976 (Harper & Row)
- Publication place: United States
- Media type: Print
- ISBN: 0060113790

To Have or to Be? is a 1976 book by psychoanalyst Erich Fromm, in which he differentiates between having and being. It was originally published in the World Perspectives book series edited by Ruth Nanda Anshen for Harper & Row publishing firm.

Fromm writes that modern society has become materialistic and prefers "having" to "being". He mentions the great promise of unlimited happiness, freedom, material abundance, and domination of nature. These hopes reached their highs when the industrial age began. One could feel that there would be unlimited production and hence unlimited consumption. Human beings aspired to be Gods of earth, but this wasn’t really the case. The great promise failed due to the unachievable aims of life, i.e. maximum pleasure and fulfillment of every desire (radical hedonism), and the egotism, selfishness and greed of people. In the industrial age, the development of this economic system was no longer determined by the question of what is good for man, but rather of what is good for the growth of the system. So, the economic system of society served people in such a way in which only their personal interests were intended to impart. The people having unlimited needs and desires like the Roman emperors, the English and French noblemen were the people who got the most out of it.

Society nowadays has completely deviated from its actual path. The materialistic nature of people of "having" has been more developed than "being". Modern industrialization has made great promises, but all these promises are developed to fulfill their interests and increase their possessions. In every mode of life, people should ponder more on the "being" nature and not towards the "having" nature. This is the truth which people deny and thus people of the modern world have completely lost their inner selves. The point of being is more important as everyone is mortal, and thus having of possessions will become useless after their death, because the possessions which are transferred to the life after death, will be what the person actually was inside.

== See also ==
- Post-materialism
