= Psychoanalysis and Religion =

1950 book by Erich Fromm

- Cover of the first edition
- Author: Erich Fromm
- Language: English
- Publisher: Yale University Press
- Publication date: 1950
- Publication place: United States
- Pages: 119
- ISBN: 0-300-00089-8
- Dewey Decimal: 131.34 F932p

Psychoanalysis and Religion is a 1950 book by social psychologist and psychoanalyst Erich Fromm, in which he attempts to explain the purpose and goals of psychoanalysis in relation to ethics and religion.

== Forward ==
In the forward to the first edition, Fromm explains that Psychoanalysis and Religion is a continuation of the thoughts he expressed in his 1947 book Man for Himself. He states that he is not asserting that his thesis applies to all researchers and practitioners in the field of psychoanalysis. (Note: Fromm, Erich (1950). Psychoanalysis and Religion. New Haven, CT, United States: Yale University Press. ISBN 0-300-00089-8. "psychoanalysis and religion.")

In an updated forward to a 1967 printing, Fromm indicates that he believed the work had held up despite advances made over the intervening years, and he made no changes.

According to an early reviewer, Fromm wrote Psychoanalysis and Religion in "an effort to reconcile the faith of the scientist with the ageless belief of man in the goodness and omnipotence of the Absolute...."

As evidenced by this and his other works, Fromm was fascinated by the psychological aspects of religion and what seemed to be a ubiquitous need for religion by humans. Fromm postulated an explanation for this phenomenon, that people respond to and are comforted by the structure and discipline of church authority. Religion helps people to find fellowship and some modicum of control over their lives, and is thus a defense against feelings of powerlessness and loneliness. "To some people return to religion is the answer, not as an act of faith but in order to escape an intolerable doubt; they make this decision not out of devotion but in search of security." (Fromm 1950, p. 4) Self-awareness, with its potential for causing acute emotional feelings, can be frightening and overwhelming. Religion may serve to help ameliorate such fears.

In discerning the positive and negative effects of religion on individuals, Fromm drew a distinction between authoritarian and humanistic religions. Authoritarian religious entities promulgate the belief that humans are at the mercy of an omnipotent God, whereas humanistic ones promote the belief that the power of God is visible in the mane of the individual. According to Fromm, authoritarian religions disserve the individual by denying their individual identities, while humanistic ones provide for personal validation and growth.

While Fromm provided for the possibility that religion could be a positive influence in an individual's life, perhaps facilitating happiness and comfort, his critique serves mainly to condemn, at a very basic level, most religious orders, especially those orders most commonly practiced in Western culture. Accordingly, Fromm's thesis is rejected by most theologians.

== See also ==
- Psychology of religion
- Jensen, Walter A. (2017). "Humanistic and authoritarian religions." In Erich Fromm's contributions to sociological theory. Kalamazoo, MI: Printmill, pp. 11-58. ISBN 9780970491947.
