= Alan Gregg (physician) =

American physician (1890–1957)

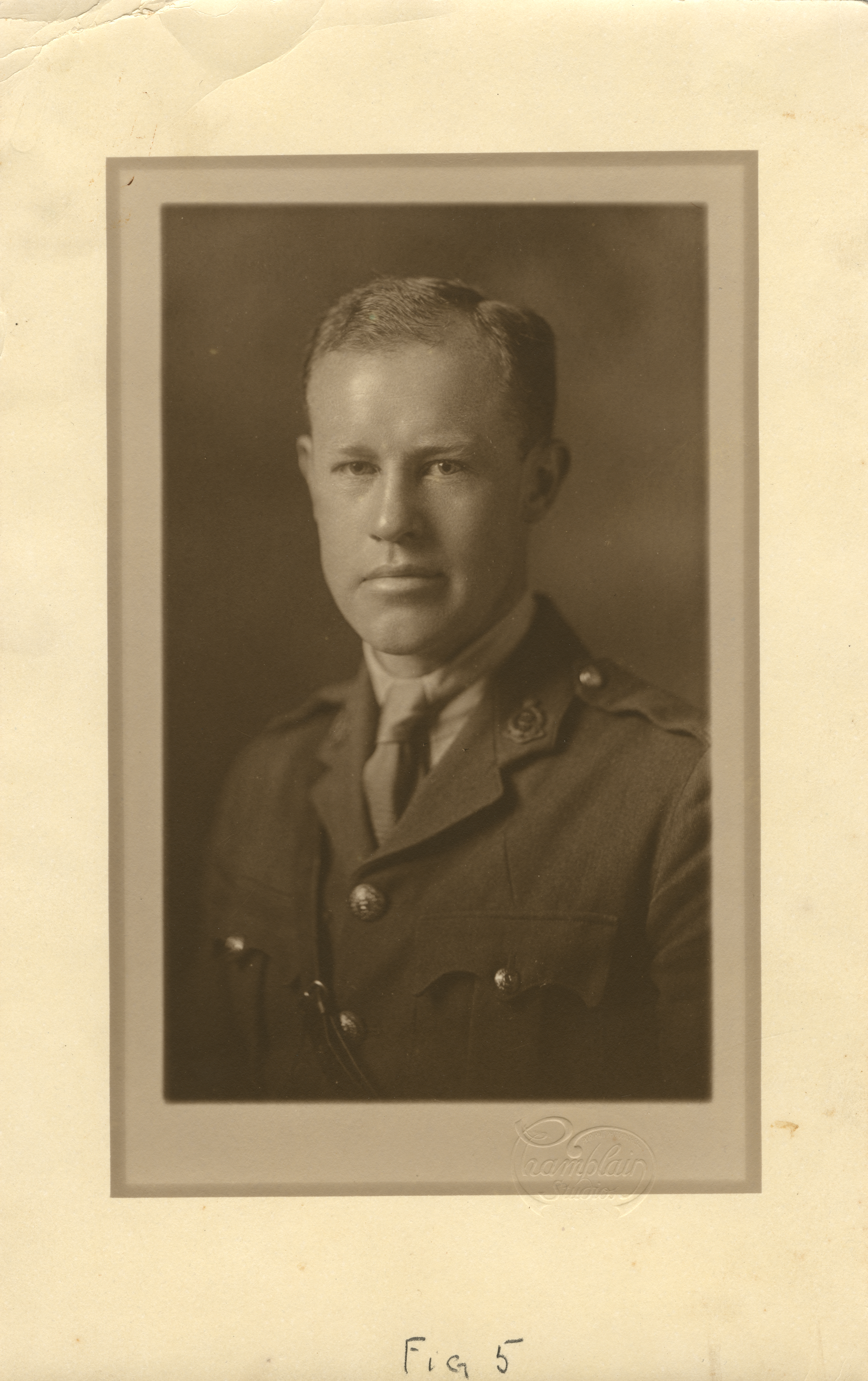
- Born: July 11, 1890; Colorado Springs, Colorado
- Died: June 19, 1957 (aged 66); Big Sur, California
- Education: Harvard University (A.B. 1911); Harvard University (M.D. 1916)
- Medical career
- Institutions: Harvard Surgical Unit (Nov. 1917 - Jan. 1919); Rockefeller Foundation (1919-1956)
- Awards: Lasker Award

Alan Gregg (1890–1957) was an American physician active in the fields of public health, medical education and research. Gregg worked at the Rockefeller Foundation in New York City from 1919 until he retired in 1956, in that time spending 20 years as Director of the Medical Sciences Division and finishing his career as the foundation's vice president.

== Career ==
During his career, he helped develop the United States' now predominant model for funding medical research. Rockefeller grants that he championed helped finance the development of sulfanilamide and penicillin, some of the first antibiotic drugs.

In 1940 he gave a Terry Lecture on the topic of medical research. Throughout his career, he declined many honorary degrees and awards because he did not want to be in the position of later giving a grant to an award donor. However, in 1956, after his retirement, he accepted a special Lasker Award that recognized his contributions to medicine. He was a fellow of the American Association for the Advancement of Science, an honorary fellow of the Royal Society of Medicine and received the French Legion of Honor. He was an elected member of both the American Philosophical Society and the American Academy of Arts and Sciences.

== Legacy ==
In 1958, after his death, the American Association of Medical Colleges inaugurated a lecture series named in his honor. Following his death, The New York Times wrote, "Tomorrow's good doctors will still be learning from Alan Gregg."
