= Marx's Concept of Man =

1961 book by Erich Fromm

- Cover of the 1961 paperback edition
- Author: Erich Fromm
- Language: English
- Subject: Marxist humanism, Marx's theory of human nature
- Publisher: Frederick Ungar Publishing Co.
- Publication date: 1961
- Publication place: United States
- Media type: Print (Hardcover and Paperback)
- Pages: 263
- ISBN: 978-1472513953

Marx's Concept of Man is a 1961 book about Karl Marx's theory of human nature by the psychoanalyst Erich Fromm.

== Summary ==
In Marx's Concept of Man, Erich Fromm provides a detailed analysis of Karl Marx's ideas about human nature and how those ideas informed his economic and political theories. Fromm shows how Marx's conception of man as a "species-being" who is fundamentally social and cooperative, rather than selfish and individualistic, shaped his vision of a society based on economic justice and equality. Fromm also critiques Marx's idea that religion is the "opiate of the people," arguing that it is actually an expression of man's alienation from himself and from others. Fromm concludes that Marx's greatest contribution was his recognition of the human need for self-actualization, which can only be met through social relationships based on love and solidarity.

Fromm praises Reason and Revolution (1941), one of Herbert Marcuse's books on Georg Wilhelm Friedrich Hegel and Raya Dunayevskaya's Marxism and Freedom: From 1776 Until Today (1958).
