= Character orientation =

Personality traits theorised by Erich Fromm

Character orientation is how people relate to the world by acquiring and using things (assimilation) and by relating to self and others (socialization), and they can do so either nonproductively or productively. Erich Fromm was a theorist who came up with five different character orientations: Receptive, Exploitative, Hoarding, Marketing and Productive.

== History ==
German-American psychoanalyst Erich Fromm was influenced by Freudian ideologies when coming up with the theory of character orientation. The basis of character orientation comes from Freud who said that character traits underlie behavior and that they must be inferred from it. These character traits can be powerful forces which are totally unconscious to the person. Fromm along with Freud believed that the most important aspect in one's character was not a single character trait, but rather, the total character organization from where many single character traits follow. These character traits can be understood as a syndrome resulting from a particular character orientation. In other words, the character of any given person is a blend of all, or some of the orientations, but where one is more predominant.

== Nonproductive orientation ==
=== Receptive orientation ===
They receive satisfaction from outside factors, and thus they passively wait for others to provide them with things that they need. For example, they want someone to provide them with love and attention. They are not the ones to give these things away and often lose loved ones who are close to them because of their inabilities to talk about their feelings or troubles. They find it hard to let go of past issues, often trivial, and develop a feeling of a secure present and future. They tend to see minor, innocent things as a threat to their security with a spouse or loved one. Fromm characterised the receptive orientation as lacking creativity.

=== Exploitative orientation ===
Exploitative-oriented people aggressively take what they want rather than passively receiving it. These types of people do whatever they can to get what they want; even if it includes stealing, or snatching something away from somebody else just to get it.

=== Hoarding orientation ===
Hoarding-oriented people save what they already have obtained, including their opinions, feelings, and material possessions. It may be love, power, or someone’s time.

=== Marketing orientation ===
People who are marketing oriented see themselves as commodities and value themselves against the criterion of their ability to sell themselves. They have fewer positive qualities than the other orientations because they are essentially empty.

== Productive orientation ==
There is a healthy personality as well, which Erich Fromm occasionally refers to as "the person without a mask". This is the type of person who, without disavowing his or her biological and social nature, does not avoid freedom and responsibility. This person most likely comes out of a family that loves, which prefers reason to rules, and freedom to conformity.

== See also ==
- Erich Fromm
- Personality
