= Erich Fromm =

German-American psychologist (1900–1980)

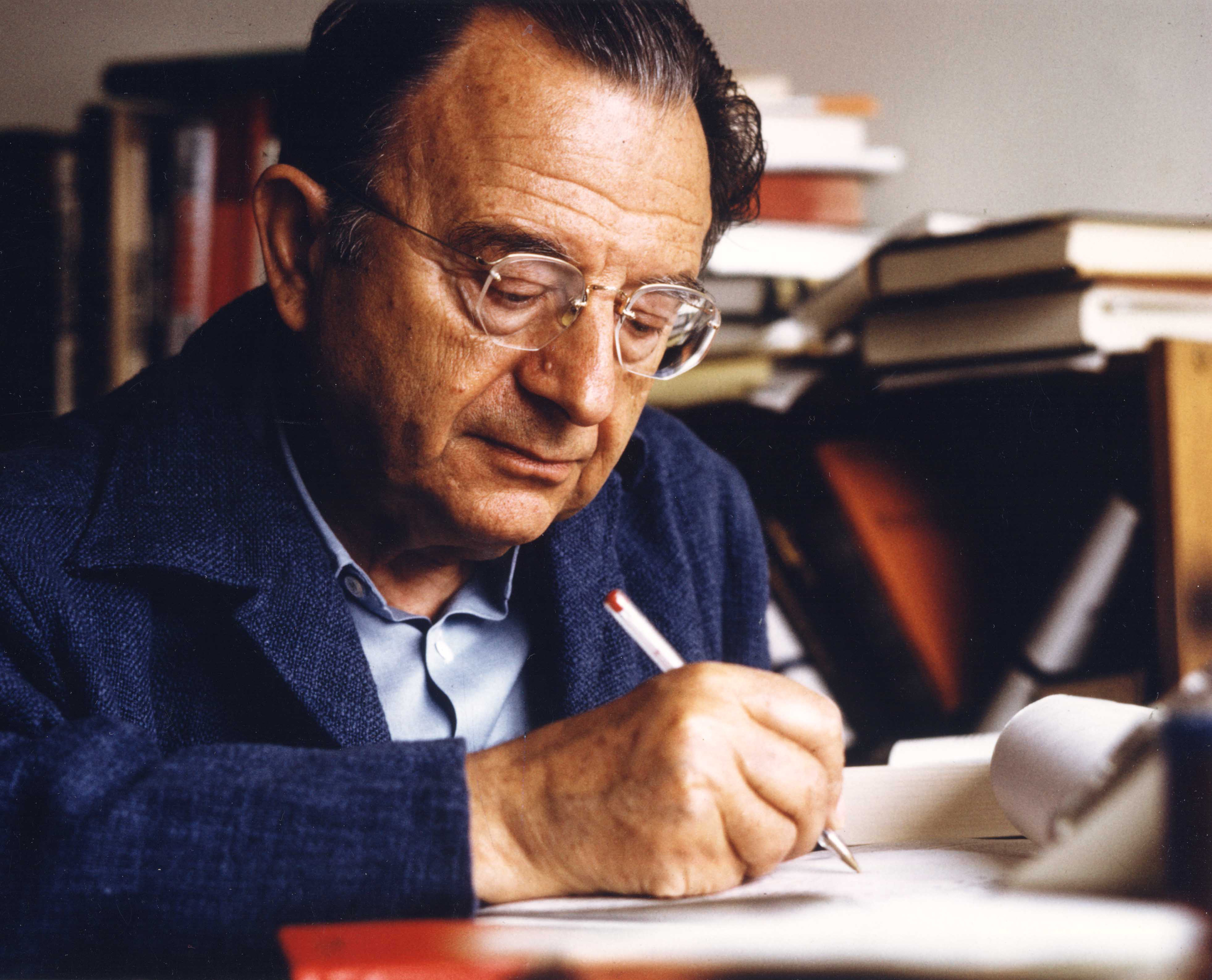
- Fromm in 1974
- Born: Erich Seligmann Fromm; March 23, 1900; Frankfurt am Main, Prussia, German Empire
- Died: March 18, 1980 (aged 79); Muralto, Ticino, Switzerland

Education
- Education: University of Frankfurt am Main; Heidelberg University (PhD, 1922)

Philosophical work
- Era: 20th-century philosophy
- Region: Western philosophy
- School: Continental philosophy; Frankfurt School; psychoanalysis; Marxist humanism; humanistic Judaism
- Institutions: University of Frankfurt am Main; Michigan State University
- Main interests: Social psychology, social theory
- Notable ideas: Being and having as modes of existence, security versus freedom, social character, character orientation

Erich Seligmann Fromm (/frɒm/, German: [ˈeːʁɪç ˈfʁɔm]; March 23, 1900 – March 18, 1980) was a German-American social psychologist, psychoanalyst, sociologist, humanistic philosopher, and democratic socialist. He was a German Jew who fled the Nazi regime and settled in the United States. He was one of the founders of the William Alanson White Institute of Psychiatry, Psychoanalysis and Psychology in New York City and was associated with the Frankfurt School of critical theory. (Note: For a second name he was given that of his grandfather on his father's side, hence Seligmann Pinchas Fromm, although the registry office in Frankfurt does not record him as such, but as Erich Seligmann Fromm. Furthermore, his parents addressed his mail to "Erich S. Fromm".)

== Life ==
Erich Fromm was born on March 23, 1900, at Frankfurt am Main, the only child of Rosa (née Krause) and Naphtali Fromm. He started his academic studies in 1918 at the University of Frankfurt am Main with two semesters of jurisprudence. During the summer semester of 1919, Fromm studied at the University of Heidelberg, where he began studying sociology under Alfred Weber (brother of sociologist Max Weber), psychiatrist-philosopher Karl Jaspers, and Heinrich Rickert. Fromm received his Ph.D. in sociology from Heidelberg in 1922 with a dissertation under the title Das jüdische Gesetz. Ein Beitrag zur Soziologie des Diaspora-Judentums (The Jewish Law: A Contribution to the Sociology of Jewish Diaspora).

Fromm at the time became strongly involved in Zionism, under the influence of the religious Zionist rabbi Nehemia Anton Nobel. He was very active in Jewish Studentenverbindungen and other Zionist organisations. But he soon turned away from Zionism, saying that it conflicted with his ideal of a "universalist Messianism and Humanism".

During the mid-1920s, he trained to become a psychoanalyst through Frieda Reichmann's psychoanalytic sanatorium in Heidelberg. They married in 1926, but separated shortly after and divorced in 1942. He began his own clinical practice in 1927. In 1930 he joined the Frankfurt Institute for Social Research and completed his psychoanalytical training.

After the Nazi takeover of power in Germany, Fromm moved first to Geneva and then, in 1934, to Columbia University in New York. Together with Karen Horney and Harry Stack Sullivan, Fromm belongs to a Neo-Freudian school of psychoanalytical thought. Horney and Fromm each had a marked influence on the other's thought, with Horney illuminating some aspects of psychoanalysis for Fromm and the latter elucidating sociology for Horney. Their relationship ended in the late 1930s. After leaving Columbia, Fromm helped form the New York branch of the Washington School of Psychiatry in 1943, and in 1946 co-founded the William Alanson White Institute of Psychiatry, Psychoanalysis, and Psychology. He was on the faculty of Bennington College from 1941 to 1949, and taught courses at the New School for Social Research in New York from 1941 to 1959.

When Fromm moved to Mexico City in 1949, he became a professor at the National Autonomous University of Mexico (UNAM) and established a psychoanalytic section at the medical school there. Meanwhile, he taught as a professor of psychology at Michigan State University from 1957 to 1961 and as an adjunct professor of psychology at the graduate division of Arts and Sciences at New York University after 1962. He taught at UNAM until his retirement, in 1965, and at the Mexican Society of Psychoanalysis (SMP) until 1974. In 1974, he moved from Mexico City to Muralto, Switzerland, and died at his home in 1980, five days before his eightieth birthday. All the while, Fromm maintained his own clinical practice and published a series of books.

In 1962 Fromm helped initiate and co-found the International Federation of Psychoanalytic Societies (IFPS), formally established in Amsterdam that year as an alternative to the IPA.

Fromm was reportedly an atheist (Note: About the same time he stopped observing Jewish religious rituals and rejected a cause he had once embraced, Zionism. He "just didn't want to participate in any division of the human race, whether religious or political," he explained decades later (Wershba, p. 12), by which time he was a confirmed atheist.) but described his position as "nontheistic mysticism".

== Psychological theory ==
Beginning with his first seminal work of 1941, Escape from Freedom (known in Britain as The Fear of Freedom), Fromm's writings were notable as much for their social and political commentary as for their philosophical and psychological underpinnings. Indeed, Escape from Freedom is viewed as one of the founding works of political psychology. His second important work, Man for Himself: An Inquiry into the Psychology of Ethics, first published in 1947, continued and enriched the ideas of Escape from Freedom. Taken together, these books outlined Fromm's theory of human character, which was a natural outgrowth of Fromm's theory of human nature. Fromm's most popular book was The Art of Loving, an international bestseller first published in 1956, which recapitulated and complemented the theoretical principles of human nature found in Escape from Freedom and Man for Himself—principles which were revisited in many of Fromm's other major works.

Central to Fromm's world view was his interpretation of the Talmud and Hasidism. He began studying Talmud as a young man under Rabbi J. Horowitz and later under Rabbi Salman Baruch Rabinkow, a Chabad Hasid. While working towards his doctorate in sociology at the University of Heidelberg, Fromm studied the Tanya by the founder of Chabad, Rabbi Shneur Zalman of Liadi. Fromm also studied under Nehemia Nobel and Ludwig Krause while studying in Frankfurt. Fromm's grandfather and two great-grandfathers on his father's side were rabbis, and a great uncle on his mother's side was a noted Talmudic scholar. However, Fromm turned away from orthodox Judaism in 1926, towards secular interpretations of scriptural ideals.

The cornerstone of Fromm's humanistic philosophy is his interpretation of the biblical story of Adam and Eve's exile from the Garden of Eden. Drawing on his knowledge of the Talmud, Fromm pointed out that being able to distinguish between good and evil is generally considered to be a virtue, but that biblical scholars generally consider Adam and Eve to have sinned by disobeying God and eating from the Tree of Knowledge. However, departing from traditional religious orthodoxy on this, Fromm extolled the virtues of humans taking independent action and using reason to establish moral values rather than adhering to authoritarian moral values.

Beyond a simple condemnation of authoritarian value systems, Fromm used the story of Adam and Eve as an allegorical explanation for human biological evolution and existential angst, asserting that when Adam and Eve ate from the Tree of Knowledge, they became aware of themselves as being separate from nature while still being part of it. This is why they felt "naked" and "ashamed": they had evolved into human beings, conscious of themselves, their own mortality, and their powerlessness before the forces of nature and society, and no longer united with the universe as they were in their instinctive, pre-human existence as animals. According to Fromm, the awareness of a disunited human existence is a source of guilt and shame, and the solution to this existential dichotomy is found in the development of one's uniquely human powers of love and reason. However, Fromm distinguished his concept of love from unreflective popular notions as well as Freudian paradoxical love (see the criticism by Marcuse below).

Fromm considered love an interpersonal creative capacity rather than an emotion, and he distinguished this creative capacity from what he considered to be various forms of narcissistic neuroses and sado-masochistic tendencies that are commonly held out as proof of "true love". Indeed, Fromm viewed the experience of "falling in love" as evidence of one's failure to understand the true nature of love, which he believed always had the common elements of care, responsibility, respect, and knowledge. Drawing from his knowledge of the Hebrew Bible, Fromm pointed to the story of Jonah, who did not wish to save the residents of Nineveh from the consequences of their sin, as demonstrative of his belief that the qualities of care and responsibility are generally absent from most human relationships. Fromm also asserted that few people in modern society had respect for the autonomy of their fellow human beings, much less the objective knowledge of what other people truly wanted and needed.

Fromm believed that freedom was an aspect of human nature that we either embrace or escape. He observed that embracing our freedom of will was healthy, whereas escaping freedom through the use of escape mechanisms was the root of psychological conflicts. Fromm outlined three of the most common escape mechanisms:

- Automaton conformity: changing one's ideal self to conform to a perception of society's preferred type of personality, losing one's true self in the process; Automaton conformity displaces the burden of choice from self to society;
- Authoritarianism: giving control of oneself to another. By submitting one's freedom to someone else, this act removes the freedom of choice almost entirely.
- Destructiveness: any process which attempts to eliminate others or the world as a whole, all to escape freedom. Fromm said that "the destruction of the world is the last, almost desperate attempt to save myself from being crushed by it".

The word biophilia was frequently used by Fromm as a description of a productive psychological orientation and "state of being". For example, in an addendum to his book The Heart of Man: Its Genius For Good and Evil, Fromm wrote as part of his humanist credo:

"I believe that the man choosing progress can find a new unity through the development of all his human forces, which are produced in three orientations. These can be presented separately or together: biophilia, love for humanity and nature, and independence and freedom."

Erich Fromm postulated the following basic needs:

Need	Description
Transcendence	Being thrown into the world without their consent, humans have to transcend their nature by destroying or creating people or things. Humans can destroy through malignant aggression, or killing for reasons other than survival, but they can also create and care about their creations.
Rootedness	Rootedness is the need to establish roots and to feel at home again in the world. Productively, rootedness enables us to grow beyond the security of our mother and establish ties with the outside world. With the nonproductive strategy, we become fixated and afraid to move beyond the security and safety of our mother or a mother substitute.
Sense of Identity	The drive for a sense of identity is expressed nonproductively as conformity to a group and productively as individuality.
Frame of orientation	Understanding the world and our place in it.
Excitation and Stimulation	Actively striving for a goal rather than simply responding.
Unity	A sense of oneness between one person and the "natural and human world outside."
Effectiveness	The need to feel accomplished.

Fromm's thesis of the "escape from freedom" is epitomized in the following passage. The "individualized man" referenced by Fromm is man bereft of the "primary ties" of belonging (such as nature, family, etc.), also expressed as "freedom from":

There is only one possible, productive solution for the relationship of individualized man with the world: his active solidarity with all men and his spontaneous activity, love and work, which unite him again with the world, not by primary ties but as a free and independent individual.... However, if the economic, social and political conditions... do not offer a basis for the realization of individuality in the sense just mentioned, while at the same time people have lost those ties which gave them security, this lag makes freedom an unbearable burden. It then becomes identical with doubt, with a kind of life which lacks meaning and direction. Powerful tendencies arise to escape from this kind of freedom into submission or some kind of relationship to man and the world which promises relief from uncertainty, even if it deprives the individual of his freedom.

— Erich Fromm

=== Five basic orientations ===
In his book Man for Himself, Fromm spoke of "orientation of character". He differentiates his theory of character from that of Freud by focusing on two ways an individual relates to the world. Freud analyzed character in terms of libido organization, whereas Fromm says that in the process of living, we relate to the world by: 1) acquiring and assimilating things – "Assimilation", and 2) reacting to people – "Socialization". Fromm asserted that these two ways of relating to the world were not instinctive, but an individual's response to the peculiar circumstances of his or her life; he also believed that people are never exclusively one type of orientation. These two ways of relating to life's circumstances lead to basic character-orientations.

Fromm lists four types of nonproductive character orientation, which he called receptive, exploitative, hoarding, and marketing, and one positive character orientation, which he called productive. Receptive and exploitative orientations are basically how an individual may relate to other people and are socialization attributes of character. A hoarding orientation is an acquiring and assimilating materials/valuables character trait. The marketing orientation arises in response to the human situation in the modern era. The current needs of the market determine value. It is a relativistic ethic. In contrast, the productive orientation is an objective ethic. Despite the existential struggles of humanity, each human has the potential for love, reason and productive work in life. Fromm writes, "It is the paradox of human existence that man must simultaneously seek for closeness and for independence; for oneness with others and at the same time for the preservation of his uniqueness and particularity. ...the answer to this paradox – and to the moral problems of man – is productiveness."

=== Fromm's influence on other notable psychologists ===
Fromm's four non-productive orientations were subject to validation through a psychometric test, The Person Relatedness Test by Elias H. Porter, PhD in collaboration with Carl Rogers, PhD at the University of Chicago's Counseling Center between 1953 and 1955. Fromm's four non-productive orientations also served as basis for the LIFO test, first published in 1967 by Stuart Atkins, Alan Katcher, PhD, and Elias Porter, PhD and the Strength Deployment Inventory, first published in 1971 by Elias H. Porter, PhD. Fromm also influenced his student Sally Liberman Smith who went on to become the founder of the Lab School of Washington and the Baltimore Lab School.

== Critique of Freud ==
Fromm examined the life and work of Sigmund Freud at length. He identified a discrepancy between early and later Freudian theory: namely that, prior to World War I, Freud had described human drives as a tension between desire and repression, but after the end of the war, began framing human drives as a struggle between biologically universal Life and Death (Eros and Thanatos) instincts. Fromm charged Freud and his followers with never acknowledging the contradictions between the two theories.

Fromm also criticized Freud's dualistic thinking. According to Fromm, Freudian descriptions of human consciousness as struggles between two poles were narrow and limiting. Fromm also condemned Freud as a misogynist unable to think outside the patriarchal milieu of early 20th century Vienna. However, in spite of these criticisms, Fromm nonetheless expressed a great respect for Freud and his accomplishments. Fromm contended that Freud was one of the "architects of the modern age", alongside Albert Einstein and Karl Marx, but emphasized that he considered Marx both far more historically important than Freud and a finer thinker.

== Political ideas and activism ==
Fromm's best known work, Escape from Freedom, focuses on the human urge to seek a source of authority and control upon reaching a freedom that was thought to be an individual's true desire. Fromm's critique of the modern political order and capitalist system led him to seek insights from medieval feudalism. In Escape from Freedom, he discerned a certain value in the lack of individual freedom, rigid structure, and obligations required of the members of medieval society:

What characterizes medieval in contrast to modern society is its lack of individual freedom…But although a person was not free in the modern sense, neither was he alone and isolated. In having a distinct, unchangeable, and unquestionable place in the social world from the moment of birth, man was rooted in a structuralized whole, and thus life had a meaning which left no place, and no need for doubt… There was comparatively little competition. One was born into a certain economic position which guaranteed a livelihood determined by tradition, just as it carried economic obligations to those higher in the social hierarchy.

The culmination of Fromm's social and political philosophy came in his 1955 book The Sane Society, which argued in favor of a humanistic and democratic socialism. Building primarily upon the early works of Karl Marx, Fromm sought to re-emphasise the ideal of freedom, missing from most Soviet Marxism and more frequently found in the writings of libertarian socialists and liberal theoreticians. Fromm's brand of socialism rejected both Western capitalism and Soviet communism, which he saw as dehumanizing, and which resulted in the virtually universal modern phenomenon of alienation.

Fromm became one of the founders of socialist humanism, promoting the early writings of Marx and his humanist messages to the US and Western European public. He engaged with a Christian-Marxist intellectual dialogue group organized by Milan Machovec and others in 1960s Communist Czechoslovakia.

In the early 1960s, Fromm published two books dealing with Marxist thought (Marx's Concept of Man and Beyond the Chains of Illusion: My Encounter with Marx and Freud). In 1965, working to stimulate the Western and Eastern cooperation between Marxist humanists, Fromm published a series of articles entitled Socialist Humanism: An International Symposium. In 1966, the American Humanist Association named him Humanist of the Year.

For a period, Fromm was also active in U.S. politics. He joined the Socialist Party of America in the mid-1950s, and did his best to help them provide an alternative viewpoint to McCarthyist trends in some US political thought. This alternative viewpoint was best expressed in his 1961 paper May Man Prevail? An Inquiry into the Facts and Fictions of Foreign Policy. However, as a co-founder of SANE, Fromm's strongest political activism was in the international peace movement, fighting against the nuclear arms race and U.S. involvement in the Vietnam War. After supporting Senator Eugene McCarthy's losing bid for the Democratic presidential nomination, Fromm more or less retreated from the American political scene, although he did write a paper in 1974 entitled Remarks on the Policy of Détente for a hearing held by the U.S. Senate Committee on Foreign Relations. Fromm was awarded the Nelly Sachs Prize in 1979.

== Criticism ==
In Eros and Civilization, Herbert Marcuse is critical of Fromm: In the beginning, he was a radical theorist, but later he turned to conformity. Marcuse also noted that Fromm, as well as his close colleagues Sullivan and Karen Horney, removed Freud's libido theory and other radical concepts, which thus reduced psychoanalysis to a set of idealist ethics, which only embrace the status quo. Fromm's response, in both The Sane Society and in The Anatomy of Human Destructiveness, argues that Freud indeed deserves substantial credit for recognizing the central importance of the unconscious, but also that he tended to reify his own concepts that depicted the self as the passive outcome of instinct and social control, with minimal volition or variability. Fromm argues that later scholars such as Marcuse accepted these concepts as dogma, whereas social psychology requires a more dynamic theoretical and empirical approach.

== Works ==
=== Early work in German ===
- Das jüdische Gesetz. Ein Beitrag zur Soziologie des Diaspora-Judentums. Promotion, 1922. ISBN 3-453-09896-X.
- Über Methode und Aufgaben einer analytischen Sozialpsychologie. Zeitschrift für Sozialforschung, Bd. 1, 1932, S. 28–54.
- Die psychoanalytische Charakterologie und ihre Bedeutung für die Sozialpsychologie. Zeitschrift für Sozialforschung, Bd. 1, 1932, S. 253–277.
- Sozialpsychologischer Teil. In: Studien über Autorität und Familie. Forschungsberichte aus dem Institut für Sozialforschung. Alcan, Paris 1936, S. 77–135.
- Zweite Abteilung: Erhebungen (Erich Fromm u.a.). In: Studien über Autorität und Familie. Forschungsberichte aus dem Institut für Sozialforschung. Alcan, Paris 1936, S. 229–469.
- Die Furcht vor der Freiheit, 1941 (In English, "Fear/Dread of Freedom"). ISBN 3-423-35024-5
- Psychoanalyse & Ethik, 1946. ISBN 3-423-35011-3
- Psychoanalyse & Religion, 1949. ISBN 3-423-34105-X (The Dwight H. Terry Lectureship 1949/1950)

=== Later works in English ===
- Escape from Freedom (US), The Fear of Freedom (UK) (1941) ISBN 978-0-8050-3149-2
- Man for Himself: An Inquiry into the Psychology of Ethics (1947) ISBN 978-0-8050-1403-7
- Psychoanalysis and Religion (1950) ISBN 978-0-300-00089-4
- The Forgotten Language: An Introduction to the Understanding of Dreams, Fairy Tales, and Myths (1951) ISBN 978-0-03-018436-9
- The Sane Society (1955) ISBN 978-0-415-60586-1
- The Art of Loving (1956) ISBN 978-0-06-112973-5
- Sigmund Freud's Mission: An Analysis of his Personality and Influence (1959)
- Zen Buddhism and Psychoanalysis (1960) ISBN 978-0-285-64747-3
- May Man Prevail? An Inquiry into the Facts and Fictions of Foreign Policy (1961) ISBN 978-0-385-00035-2
- Marx's Concept of Man (1961) ISBN 978-0-8264-7791-0
- Beyond the Chains of Illusion: My Encounter with Marx and Freud (1962) ISBN 978-0-8264-1897-5
- The Dogma of Christ and Other Essays on Religion, Psychology and Culture (1963) ISBN 978-0-415-28999-3
- The Heart of Man: Its Genius for Good and Evil (1964) ISBN 978-0-06-090795-2
- (editor) Socialist Humanism: An International Symposium, (1965)
- You Shall Be as Gods: A Radical Interpretation of the Old Testament and Its Tradition (1966) ISBN 978-0-8050-1605-5
- The Revolution of Hope: Toward a Humanized Technology (1968) ISBN 978-1-59056-183-6
- The Nature of Man (1968) ISBN 978-0-86562-082-7
- The Crisis of Psychoanalysis: Essays on Freud, Marx and Social Psychology (1970) ISBN 978-0-449-30792-2
- (with Michael Maccoby). Social Character in a Mexican Village: A Sociopsychoanalytic Study (1970) ISBN 978-1-56000-876-7
- The Anatomy of Human Destructiveness (1973) ISBN 978-0-8050-1604-8
- To Have or To Be? (1976) ISBN 978-0-8050-1604-8
- Greatness and Limitation of Freud's Thought (1979) ISBN 978-0-06-011389-6
- On Disobedience and Other Essays (1981) ISBN 978-0-8164-0500-8
- The Working Class in Weimar Germany: A Psychological and Sociological Study (1984) ISBN 0-907582-09-5
- For the Love of Life (1986) ISBN 0-02-910930-2
- The Revision of Psychoanalysis (1992) ISBN 0-8133-1451-8
- The Art of Being (1993) ISBN 978-0-8264-0673-6
- The Art of Listening (1994) ISBN 978-0-8264-1132-7
- On Being Human (1994) ISBN 0-8264-0576-2
- The Essential Erich Fromm: Life Between Being and Having (1995) ISBN 978-0-8264-1133-4
- Love, Sexuality, and Matriarchy: About Gender (1997) Edited and with an introduction by Rainer Funk.
- The Erich Fromm Reader (1999) ISBN 1-57392-479-2
- Beyond Freud: From Individual to Social Psychoanalysis (2010) ISBN 978-1-59056-185-0
- The Pathology of Normalcy (2010) ISBN 978-1-59056-184-3

== See also ==
- American philosophy
- Ernst Simmel
- Group narcissism
- List of American philosophers
- Psychoanalytic sociology
- Psychohistory
