= Arlette Elkaïm-Sartre =

French philosopher (1935–2016)

Arlette Elkaïm-Sartre (15 July 1935 – 16 September 2016) was a French translator and editor, adopted by the writer Jean-Paul Sartre in 1964.

== Life ==
Arlette Elkaïm was born in Constantine, Algeria, to a traditional Jewish family. Before she reached adulthood, her mother committed suicide.

During World War II, she was dismissed from school after a roll-call which revealed she was Jewish. (Students were required to give their grandfathers' full names: her paternal grandfather was Abraham Elkaïm, and her maternal grandfather was Simon Lévi-Valentin.) She then attended a synagogue school.

She grew up in a large apartment where two of her grandparents also lived, in an atmosphere she found stifling.

My father was an autodidact with ideas that were very precise and a bit narrow... he was authoritarian, and very disappointed by my mother, who was a person who liked music, liked to laugh, was a bit silly... who didn't know how to make couscous. [...] He wanted to divorce her, but he didn't want to lose me. And there was a drama, after which she committed suicide.

In 1954-55 Arlette left Algeria for Paris to study for the entrance exam to the École Normale Supérieure. In 1956, she had trouble with her teachers, which led her to write to the already quite famous Jean-Paul Sartre for advice, displaying a kind of naïve fearlessness. He replied with encouraging words, and eventually they had a brief affair. But she failed the exam, and her father ordered her home for an arranged marriage. Sartre then helped to her remain in Paris.

In 1965, Sartre formally adopted Arlette as his daughter.

She worked as an editor, and notably worked on the reports of the Russell Tribunal in the late 1960s.

In 1980, upon Sartre's death, she became his universal legatee.

She initiated and led the movement for the critical re-editing and posthumous publication of Sartre's work, which began in 1985 with the publication of the two volumes of the Critique of Dialectical Reason. She prefaced works by Sartre.

She translated and annotated the Aggadoth of the Talmud of Babylon - Ein Yaakov (preceded by an Introduction to Talmudic Literature, by Marc-Alain Ouaknin, published by Verdier, series "Les dix paroles", Lagrasse, 1982, re-edited 1990, 1450 pp.).

She has also translated for the theatre Oedipus at Colonus, a tragedy by Sophocles, performed in 2006 at the Varia theatre in Brussels in a production by Vincent Sornaga.

In 2010, she undertook the enlarged and revised edition of the book Situations.

Elkaïm died in Paris. She is buried at the cimetière du Montparnasse.

== Publications ==
Prefaces to the works of J.-P. Sartre

- Cahiers pour une morale ("Bibliothèque de philosophie", Éditions Gallimard, 1983).
- Critique de la raison dialectique (New edition with glossary, Gallimard, 1985).
- Mallarmé, la lucidité et sa face d’ombre (Presentation and notes, Arcades, Gallimard, 1986).
- L'Idiot de la famille (Bibliothèque de philosophie, new, revised and expanded edition, Gallimard, 1988).
- Vérité et existence (NRF essais, Gallimard, 1989).
- La Reine Albemarle ou le dernier touriste (Gallimard, 1991).
- Carnets de la drôle de guerre (New edition increased by a new notebook, Gallimard, 1995). Further notes for this same work in Les Mots and other autobiographical writings. Bibliothèque de la Pléiade, Gallimard 2010.
- L'existentialisme est un humanisme (Folio essais, Gallimard, 1996).
- The Imaginary. Psychologie phénoménologique de l’imagination (Folio essais, new edition Gallimard, 2005).
- Anti-Semite and Jew (new édition, 2005).
- Typhus (Scénario, Gallimard, 2007).
- What Is Literature? (Nouvelle édition, Gallimard, 2009).

Notices and notes for a new edition of Situations

- Situations, I, (New enlarged edition, presentation, notices and notes, Gallimard, 2010).
- Situations, II, (New enlarged edition, presentation, notices and notes, Gallimard, 2012).
- Situations, II, (New enlarged edition, presentation, notices and notes, Gallimard, 2013).
- Situations, IV, (New enlarged edition, presentation, notices and notes, Gallimard, 2015).
- Situations, V, (New enlarged edition, presentation, notices and notes, Gallimard, 2018).

Short stories

- Fêtes de nuit (Les Temps modernes n° 155, January 1959)
- Rayon fillettes (Les Temps modernes n° 203, April 1963).
- Le retour au pays (Les Temps modernes n° 215, April 1964).
- Dans le temps (Obliques, 1st quarter 1981).

Articles

- À propos Les Bonnes Femmes (Les Temps modernes n°173-174, August–September 1960).
- L'Avventura (Les Temps modernes n° 178, February 1961).
- Brassens à l’Olympia Les Temps Modernes n° 187, December 1961).
- The Connexion (Les Temps modernes n° 191, April 1962).
- Du cinéma considéré comme un assassinat (Les Temps modernes n° 199, December 1962).
- The Exterminating Angel (Les Temps modernes n° 206, July 1963).
- about 8½ (Les Temps modernes n° 207–208, August/September 1963).
- Alphaville ou Bêtafilm ? (Les Temps modernes n° 229, June 1965).
- Le vieil homme et l’enfant (Les Temps modernes n° 252, May 1967).
