= Situation (Sartre) =

Concept developed by philosopher Jean-Paul Sartre

Situation (French: situation) is a concept developed by French philosopher Jean-Paul Sartre. It refers to "how ritualized action might be avoided or at least confronted consciously as contrary to the subject's freedom of nihilation".

== Overview ==
The concept was first expressed in his 1943 work Being and Nothingness, where he wrote that:

[T]here is freedom only in a situation, and there is a situation only through freedom [...] There can be a free for-itself only as engaged in a resisting world. Outside of this engagement the notions of freedom, of determination, of necessity lose all meaning.

Earlier, in his 1939 novella The Childhood of a Leader collected in The Wall, Sartre expressed the concept while referring to pranks, saying that they "have a revolutionary value. They disturb. There is more destructive power in them than in all the works of Lenin."

Another famous use of the term was in 1945, in his editorial of the first issue of Les Temps modernes (Modern Times); arguing the principle of the responsibility of the intellectual towards his own times and the principle of an engaged literature, he summarized that "the writer is in a situation with his epoch." An influential use of the concept was in the context of theatre, in his 1947 essay For a Theatre of Situations, where he wrote that "if it's true that man is free in a given situation and that in and through that situation he chooses what he will be, then what we have to show in the theatre are simple and human situations and free individuals in these situations choosing what they will be".

In 1947, Sartre began to publish his series, Situations. He continued to publish entries in this series until 1976.

- Situations I: Critiques littéraires / Literary Critiques (1947)
- Situations II: Qu'est-ce que la littérature? / What Is Literature? (1947)
- Situations III / The Aftermath of War (1949)
- Situations IV: Portraits / Portraits (1964)
- Situations V: Colonialisme et Néo-Colonialisme / Colonialism and Neocolonialism (1964)
- Situations VI: Problèmes du Marxisme 1 / Problems of Marxism, Part 1 (1966)
- Situations VII: Problèmes du Marxisme 2 / Problems of Marxism, Part 2 (1967)
- Situations VIII: Autour de 1968 / The Author in 1968 (1972)
- Situations IX: Mélanges (1972)
- Situations X: Politique et Autobiographie / Life/Situations: Essays Written and Spoken (1976)

A second edition of Situations, initially edited by Arlette Elkaïm-Sartre, adds additional material but in a more chronological organisation, which means that essays often appear in different volumes of the two editions. Nine volumes of this second edition have been published so far. The French wikipedia indicates the reorganisation. A guide to the English translations of essays in the first edition of Situations is on the Progressive Geographies site.

== Guy Debord, Letterist and Situationist International ==
Sartre's concept of Situation was reprised by Guy Debord at least since the times of the Letterist International. In January 1954, the Letterist International declared: "The new beauty will be that of THE SITUATION, that is to say, provisional and lived."

Claire Gilman called Sartre a "father figure" for the Situationist International, and wrote that "Sartre and his philosophy of the situation are fundamental to the SI's notion of everyday life authentically experienced". The relationship between Sartre's philosophy of the situation and the Situationist International is clarified by Peter Wollen in his essay "Bitter Victory".
