= Yael Renan =

Israeli writer and translator (1947–2020)

- יעל רנן
- Born: Yael Renan; 17 January 1947; Tel Aviv
- Died: 2 August 2020 (aged 73); Tel Aviv
- Occupations: writer and translator

Yael Renan (Hebrew: יעל רנן; 17 January 1947 – 2 August 2020) was an Israeli writer and translator.

== Biography ==
Renan was born and grew up in Tel Aviv and attended Tel Aviv University, where she received a bachelor's degree in philosophy and a doctorate in English literature in 1978, for her work on "Figurative Language in the Prose of Modernism". She was a senior lecturer in the Department of English Literature at Tel Aviv University until her retirement in 2007 and also volunteered in the Department of Women's Studies.

The highlight of her work as a translator was the translation of James Joyce's book, Ulysses, a book of about 900 pages. Renan began translating at the age of 25 and finished translating the book after 12 years in 1985.

Renan was active in the Kav LaOved association, a non-profit association acting to protect the rights of disadvantaged workers.

She died on 2 August 2020 in Tel Aviv.

== Awards ==
Renan received the Tchernichovsky Prize for Translation in 1994.

== Literary works ==
Among Renan's notable works are the following (in Hebrew):

- Laughter in the Dark - A Look at Modern Literature, Adam Publishing, Tel Aviv, 1986
- Laughing at God, Modan Publishing, Tel Aviv, 1996 ( with Eli Tammuz)
- Goddesses and Heroes - Myths on the Boundaries of Power, published by Am Oved, Tel Aviv, 2001
- The Poisoned Apple - The Heroine in European Legends, United Kibbutz Publishing, Bnei Brak, 2007
- Imagination and the Mind, New World Publishing, Tel Aviv, 2014

== Translations ==
Notable authors and works translated into Hebrew by Renan include the following:

- Jean-Paul Sartre, The Transcendence of the Ego
- James Joyce, Ulysses
- Samuel Beckett, Endgame
- Kenneth Grahame, The Wind in the Willows
- Virginia Woolf, A Room of One's Own
- Terry Pratchett, Men at Arms
