= Sarah Richmond (philosopher) =

Professor of philosophy

Academic background
- Education: University of Oxford (PhD)
- Thesis: Derrida and Davidson (1992)

Academic work
- Era: Contemporary philosophy
- Region: Western philosophy
- Institutions: University College London

Sarah Richmond is an honorary associate professor of philosophy at University College London.

== Work ==
=== Sartrean scholarship ===
Richmond's scholarship on Sartre, has been praised for offering strong arguments through "fidelity to the original text" and without relying too much on secondary sources. Richmond argues that Sartre in basing human freedom on the ontological concept of nothingness (le néant) has been deeply influenced by Christian theology.

==== Sartre's theory of emotion ====
In her analysis of Sartre's Sketch for a Theory of the Emotions, Richmond argues that there is a clear conflict between two lines of argument about emotional experience. For example when a grimacing face appears in front of me I am "frozen with terror", an emotional equivalence of "wonder and horror". But according to Richmond, Sartre ascribes the source of this magic both to the "perceiving subject", as imposing upon the world, and to the "structure of the world", as perceived by the subject. Richmond's view has been challenged by Hatzimoysis, who defends Sartre's view, by claiming that "in being frozen" the subject simply adjusts and unifies itself to the world, therefore the conflict between two sources is removed. Richmond, however, responds to this challenge, by claiming we can still see the contradiction by simply asking: "is the subject’s emotional consciousness accurately disclosing the world or wish-fulfillingly distorting it?"

==== Translation of Being and Nothingness ====
Her 2018 translation of Jean-Paul Sartre's magnum opus Being and Nothingness (following Hazel Barnes translation in 1956) has been described as a "milestone" contribution to Sartre's scholarship and has received critical acclaim, from Sarah Bakewell, Dan Zahavi, Richard Moran, Nancy Bauer, Jonathan Rée and among others the film director Richard Eyre. Richmond cross referenced her translations with volumes at Sartre's disposal such as Henry Corbin's translation of What Is Metaphysics? by Heidegger, resources that Sartre often quotes from memory and the previous translation did not have access to. This has made her work more accurate and contextual.

=== Kleinian psychoanalysis and feminism ===
Richmond explicates the importance of Melanie Klein's claims about human development, such the saliency of the breast for feminist scholars. She opposes radical feminism in ignoring the importance of individual psychology, by advocating a "mutual enhancement" of psychoanalysis and feminism. She argues that Kleinian psychoanalysis, is a kind of psychoanalysis that gives the greatest significance to the internal world of individuals, and is therefore best suited for her thesis which aims at reconciling the internal with the external world, a version of the nature versus nurture debate. As Kleinian psychoanalysis considers the internal world as a "little society" of internal beings, which could correspond well to the world of social persons. Through drawing on Klein's views, Richmond shed's new light Susan James' claim that "at the heart of identity lies the problem of sexual identity".

== Publications ==
=== Translations ===
- Sartre, Jean-Paul; Richmond, Sarah (2022-04-19). Being and Nothingness: An Essay in Phenomenological Ontology (1 ed.). London: Routledge. doi:10.4324/9780429434013. ISBN 978-0-429-43401-3.
- Sartre, Jean-Paul (2004-06-15). The Transcendence of the Ego: A Sketch for a Phenomenological Description (0 ed.). Routledge. doi:10.4324/9780203694367. ISBN 978-0-203-69436-7.

=== Edited volumes ===
- Richmond, Sarah D.; Rees, Geraint; Edwards, Sarah J. L., eds. (2012-08-02). I Know What You're Thinking: Brain imaging and mental privacy. Oxford University Press. doi:10.1093/acprof:oso/9780199596492.001.0001. ISBN 978-0-19-959649-2.

=== Articles ===
- "Feminism and psychoanalysis: Using Melanie Klein", The Cambridge Companion to Feminism in Philosophy, Cambridge Companions to Philosophy, Cambridge: Cambridge University Press, 2000, pp. 68–86, doi:10.1017/CCOL0521624517.005, ISBN 978-0-521-62451-0
- Richmond, Sarah (2001). "Psychoanalysis and Feminism: Anorexia, the Social World, and the Internal World". Philosophy, Psychiatry, & Psychology. 8 (1): 1–12. doi:10.1353/ppp.2002.0009 – via Project MUSE.
- "Nothingness and negation". Taylor & Francis: 105–117. 2014-09-11. doi:10.4324/9781315729695-15. ISBN 978-1-315-72969-5. Archived from the original on 2024-09-05.
- Richmond, Sarah (2010), "Magic in Sartre's Early Philosophy", in Webber, Jonathan (ed.), Reading Sartre: On Phenomenology and Existentialism, Routledge, doi:10.4324/9780203844144, ISBN 978-1-136-91806-3
