= Foreign Policy of the National Liberation Front (Algeria) =

The National Liberation Front of Algeria, also known as the Front de Libération Nationale (FLN), aided a number of African Independence Movements against colonial rule in the 20th century. However, the precise impact, nature, and extent of the FLN's aid to African Independence Movements remains highly debated. That being said, the FLN's involvement is said to have been direct and indirect. For example, it directly aided Mozambique, helping to train soldiers from FRELIMO, the Mozambique Liberation Front, in Algeria. In fact, it estimated by the CIA to have trained approximately 200 FRELIMO fighters in 1964. It indirectly inspired and aided the study of post-Colonialism in Africa.

For example, the FLN inspired Amilcar Cabral, a national liberation theorist from Guinea-Bissau. Algeria gained independence from France in 1962 with the help of the FLN, and consequently, served as an example of successful and violent liberation from a colonial power for a number of African and Latin American countries. Nonetheless, the National Liberation Front of Algeria's motivations remain a point of contention. On one hand, its motivations are thought to stem from a need to control the distribution of world power, particularly in Africa, which at the time was thought to have been split between"moderate" and more "revolutionary" paths for independence. On the other hand, the motivations of the National Liberation Front of Algeria are thought to have been inspired by Gamal Abdel Nasser's pan-Arabist movement within the Arab World, encouraging its greater pan-African vision. However, Algeria's influence infiltrated not just the political, but ideological realm as well. Many Algerian elites of the FLN called for a shift from "economic and political exploitation," to "economic sufficiency and political dignity" in all of Africa.

== FRELIMO and the FLN ==
The Mozambique Liberation Front, also known as FRELIMO, adopted armed struggle against its Portuguese colonizers. However, in order to adopt armed struggle, it needed arms. The Front de Libération Nationale of Algeria is accredited with having provided weapons to national liberation groups, such as FRELIMO, in the 1960s. Yet, how long and what exactly the Front de Liberation Nationale sent to its African counterparts remains widely unknown. Eventually, Algerian instructors within the FLN shifted their focus on violent modes of resisting colonialism, to ideological political agendas. As a result, it was able to consolidate its progressive alliance with organizations like FRELIMO throughout the African continent Nonetheless, the Algerian FLN is accused with having failed with regards to leaving long-standing political and ideological impressions on FRELIMO. Unlike the FLN, FRELIMO was able to consolidate its party ideology, all the while creating and solidifying its political institutions in Mozambique. That being said, FRELIMO was able to establish itself within the society and politics of Mozambique. Therefore, it is difficult to minimize the influence of the FLN on the rise of a Marxist regime in newly post-colonial Mozambique.

== Guinea-Bissau and the FLN ==
Amilcar Cabral is a revolutionary, post-colonial theorist from Guinea-Bissau, who attempted to theorize African liberation movements in the new context of post-colonial Algeria. With regards to the effects of the FLN's intellectual influence, its elites pushed for African unity based upon the shared colonial experience, in the context of a newly post-colonial Algeria However, Africa was torn between both "moderate" and "revolutionary" paths to independence from colonial powers. After it switched to an agenda focused on political ideology, the new policy of the FLN was to sway "moderate" Africa unto a new found "political consciousness." Shortly before, the Algerian War of Independence served as a reminder to all, of the violence and horrors of colonialism and national liberation wars. Consequently, a number of post-colonial scholars argue that African national liberation movements that were anti-colonial and anti-imperialist were inspired by the FLN in Algeria. With this in mind, Amilcar Cabral was heavily influenced by Frantz Fanon, a post-colonial scholar, known to have famously authored The Wretched of the Earth, a book which was heavily influenced by his time fighting against French Colonial rule during Algerian War of Independence. In close quarters with soldiers from the FLN, the ideologies and practices of the FLN heavily influenced Fanon's work, which in turn influenced that of Amilcar Cabral, who wrote in response to Fanon.
