= Sarah Richmond =

Sarah Richmond may refer to:

- Sarah Richmond (philosopher)
- Sarah Richmond (university president)
