= In the Mesh =

- Title page for L'Engrenage (1962)
- Author: Jean-Paul Sartre
- Original title: 'L'Engrenage'
- Language: French
- Publisher: Roshangaran and Women's Studies (Persian edition, 2009)
- Publication date: 1969 (original stage publication)
- Publication place: France
- Media type: Print
- Pages: 208
- ISBN: 9789641940098

In the Mesh (French: L'Engrenage) is a screenplay written by Jean-Paul Sartre in 1946 and published in 1948. Although it was conceived as a film script, it was never made into a movie. In 1969, under the direction of Sartre himself and Jean Mercure (director and manager of the theatre), it was staged during the reopening of the Théâtre de la Ville in Paris in 1970.

In the Mesh is distinct from Sartre’s Dirty Hands (1948), though it is sometimes mistakenly thought to be a new title for that work.

One of Sartre’s stated aims in writing this screenplay was to introduce a new method of presenting the past on the cinema screen.

== Plot ==
The work is a fictional story about an imagined revolution in an unspecified, fictional location. It tells of a failed revolution and many shattered hopes. In In the Mesh, Sartre poses a fundamental question: in revolutionary and political leadership, whose hands become dirty, and whose remain clean? His answer is that anyone who enters the field of action willingly or unwillingly becomes tainted, and only those who do nothing will remain clean. The narrative also concludes that in the Third World and in countries under the influence of powerful nations, events inevitably lead to the same endpoint. Repeated revolutions create a vicious cycle, producing the same outcomes as before, with only those at the top changing.
