= Corydrane =

Psychostimulant drug

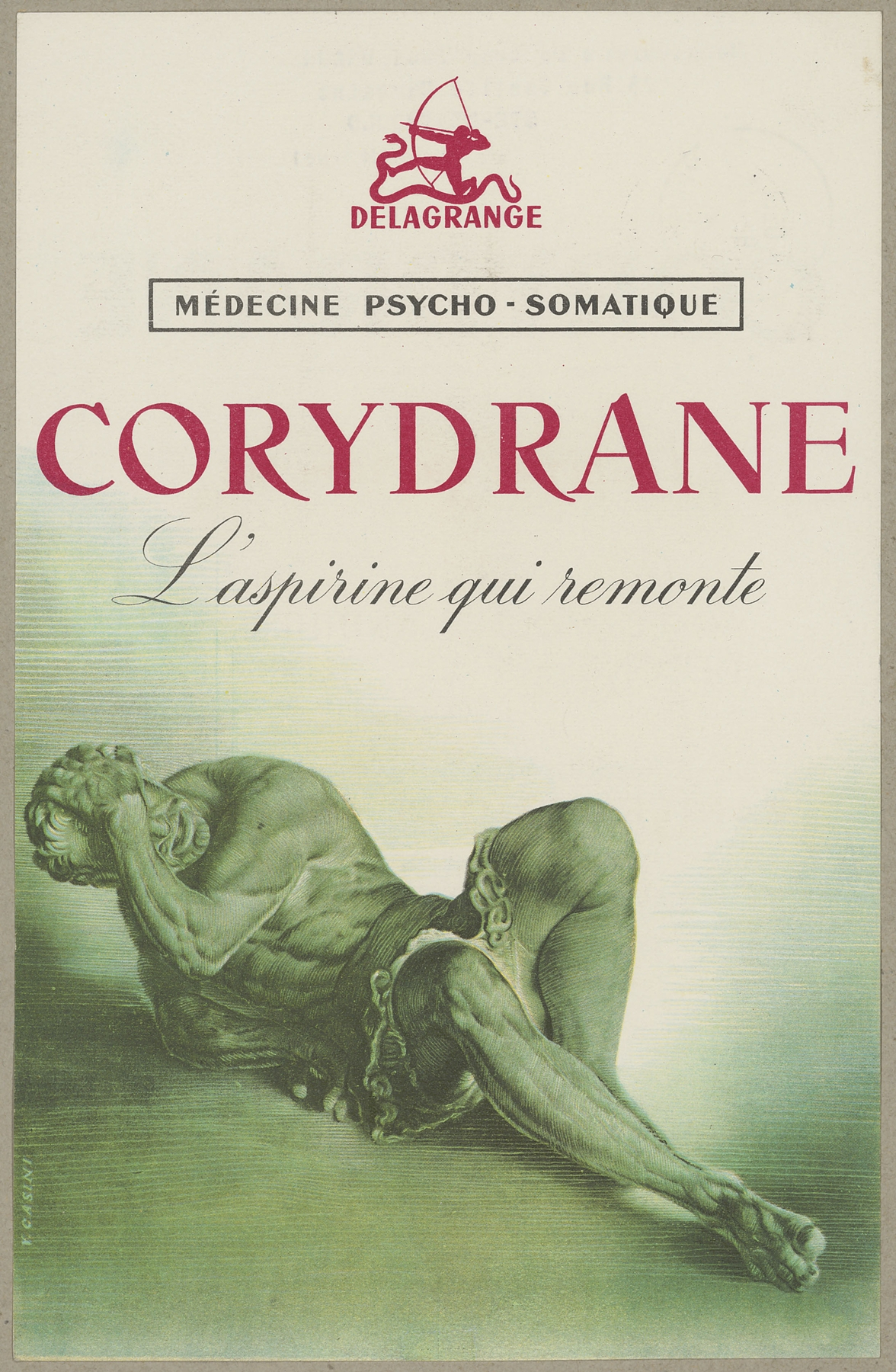
Advertisement from Delagrange Laboratories for Corydrane

Corydrane was a psychostimulant drug composed of amphetamine and aspirin and marketed by Delagrange Laboratories. It was initially available without a prescription and was widely used in the 1950s and 1960s. It was later listed as a Schedule C controlled substance and withdrawn from the French market in 1971.

Corydrane was used to treat "the flu, neuralgia, migraines, feverish aches and pains, asthenia, and physical and mental exhaustion". However, it was widely misused by students preparing for exams.

Several prominent figures in the French intellectual world were heavy users of this product. They included as Jean-Paul Sartre, André Malraux, Marguerite Duras, Françoise Sagan, and the journalist Claude Sarraute.

Jean-Paul Sartre, in particular, abused Corydrane, consuming up to a whole tube of 20 tablets a day, to write his book on Gustave Flaubert, L'Idiot de la famille, and Critique de la raison dialectique. According to his own account, this stimulant gave him, "a speed of thought and writing that was at least three times [his] normal pace".
