= Henri Delacroix =

French psychologist

Henri Delacroix (French: [ɑ̃ʁi dəlakʁwa]; 2 December 1873 – 3 December 1937) was a French psychologist, "one of the most famous and most prolific French psychologists working at the beginning of [the twentieth] century."

Born in Paris, Henri Delacroix was educated at the Lycée Henri-IV and the Sorbonne, gaining his agrégation in philosophy in 1894. After two years at the University of Berlin and the University of Heidelberg, he became a professor at the Lycée de Pau, He later became a professor and subsequently dean of the Faculty of Letters at the Sorbonne. He died in Paris.

== Works ==
- Essai sur le mysticisme spéculatif en Allemagne au quatorzième siècle, 1899.
- Études d'histoire et de psychologie du mysticisme; les grands mystiques chrétiens, 1908.
- La psychologie de Stendhal, 1918.
- La religion et la foi, 1922.
- Le langage et la pensée, 1924.
- L'analyse psychologique de la fonction linguistique, 1926.
- Psychologie de l'art; essai sur l'activité artistique, 1927.
- Les grandes formes de la vie mentale, 1934.
- L'enfant et le langage, 1934.
- Les grands mystiques chrétiens, 1938
