= Jean-Paul Sartre =

French philosopher (1905–1980)

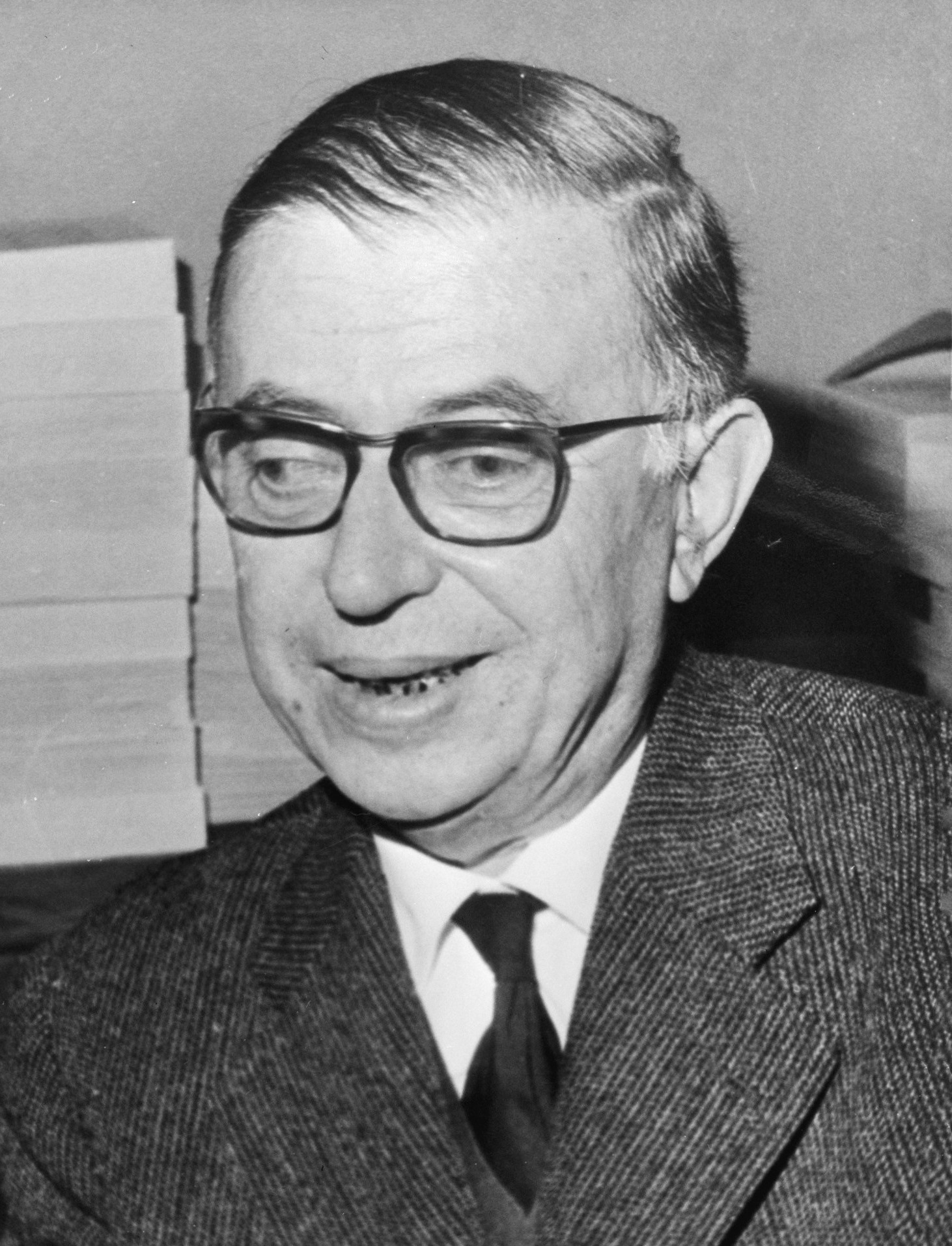
- Sartre in 1965
- Born: 21 June 1905; Paris, France
- Died: 15 April 1980 (aged 74); Paris, France
- Political party: See list: RDR (1948–1949); PCF (1952–1956); GP (1970)
- Partner: Simone de Beauvoir (1929–1980)
- Awards: Nobel Prize for Literature (1964, declined)

Education
- Education: École normale supérieure (BA, MA)
- Academic advisor: Henri Delacroix

Philosophical work
- Era: 20th-century philosophy
- Region: Western philosophy
- School: Continental philosophy, existentialism, phenomenology, existential phenomenology, hermeneutics, Western Marxism
- Notable students: Jacques-Laurent Bost; Jean-Bertrand Pontalis
- Main interests: Metaphysics, epistemology, ethics, consciousness, self-consciousness, literature, political philosophy, ontology
- Notable ideas: Bad faith, "existence precedes essence", nothingness, "Hell is other people", situation, transcendence of the ego ("every positional consciousness of an object is a non-positional consciousness of itself"), the imaginary, being for itself, neocolonialism

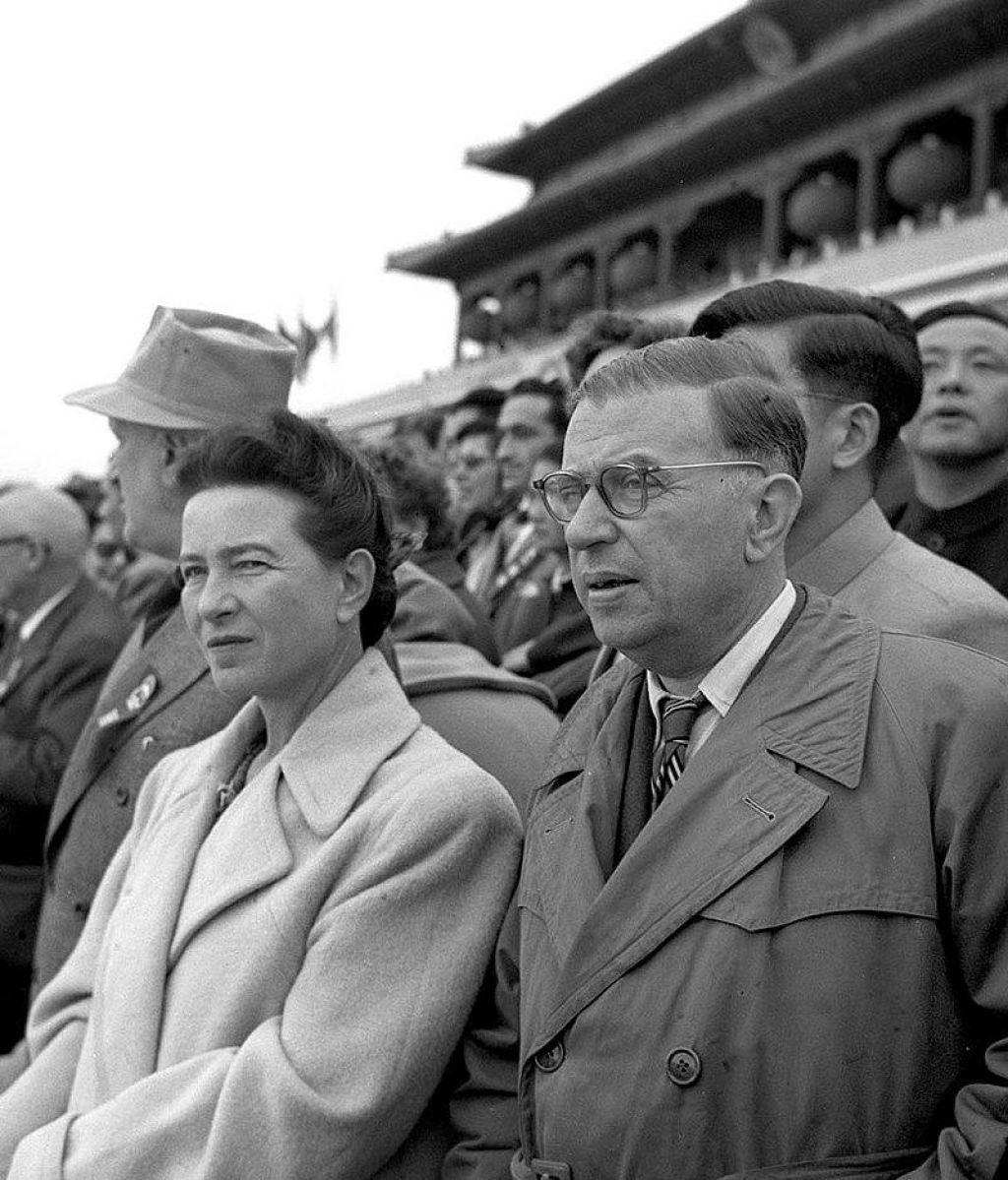
Simone de Beauvoir and Jean-Paul Sartre in Beijing, 1955

Jean-Paul Charles Aymard Sartre (/ˈsɑːrtrə/, US also /sɑːrt/; French: [saʁtʁ]; 21 June 1905 – 15 April 1980) was a French philosopher, political activist, and writer, considered a leading figure in 20th-century French philosophy and Marxism. Sartre was one of the key figures in the philosophy of existentialism (and phenomenology) and was a proponent of Libertarian Marxism. His work has influenced sociology, critical theory, post-colonial theory, and literary studies. He was awarded the 1964 Nobel Prize in Literature despite attempting to refuse it, saying that he always declined official honors and that "a writer should not allow himself to be turned into an institution".

Sartre had an open relationship with prominent feminist and fellow existentialist philosopher Simone de Beauvoir. Together, Sartre and de Beauvoir challenged the cultural and social assumptions and expectations of their upbringings, which they considered bourgeois, in both lifestyles and thought. The conflict between oppressive, spiritually destructive conformity (mauvaise foi, literally, 'bad faith') and an "authentic" way of "being" became the dominant theme of Sartre's early work, a theme embodied in his principal philosophical work Being and Nothingness (L'Être et le Néant, 1943). Sartre provided an introduction to his philosophy in his work Existentialism Is a Humanism (L'existentialisme est un humanisme, 1946), originally presented as a lecture.

Born in Paris, Sartre lost his father at the age of two and was raised primarily by his mother and grandfather, who introduced him to literature. He studied at the prestigious École Normale Supérieure, where he developed a deep interest in philosophy, influenced by thinkers like Henri Bergson, Edmund Husserl, and Martin Heidegger. Sartre's early academic career included teaching in several French lycées and engaging in provocative pranks and debates.

Sartre's life was marked by strong political engagement. During World War II, he was drafted, captured, and later released, after which he co-founded the resistance group Socialisme et Liberté. Though the group dissolved, Sartre became an influential voice in occupied France, contributing to underground literature and writing plays like No Exit. After the war, he co-founded the journal Les Temps modernes and increasingly used his platform to advocate for political and social causes. He supported anti-colonial movements, condemned French policies in Algeria, opposed U.S. intervention in Vietnam, and aligned himself at various times with Marxism and Maoism. Despite declining health in his later years, Sartre remained committed to activism and intellectual debate until his death in 1980. His funeral drew 50,000 mourners.

== Biography ==
=== Early life ===
Jean-Paul Sartre was born on 21 June 1905 in Paris, the only child of Jean-Baptiste Sartre, an officer of the French Navy, and Anne-Marie (Schweitzer). When Sartre was two years old, his father died of an illness, which he most likely contracted in Indochina. Anne-Marie moved back to her parents' house in Meudon, where she raised Sartre with help from her father Charles Schweitzer, a teacher of German who taught Sartre mathematics and introduced him to classical literature at a very early age. The theologian/organist/physician Albert Schweitzer was Sartre's cousin. When he was twelve, Sartre's mother remarried, and the family moved to La Rochelle, where he was frequently bullied, in part due to the wandering of his blind right eye (sensory exotropia).

As a teenager in the 1920s, Sartre became attracted to philosophy upon reading Henri Bergson's essay Time and Free Will: An Essay on the Immediate Data of Consciousness. He attended the Cours Hattemer, a private school in Paris. He studied and earned certificates in psychology, history of philosophy, logic, general philosophy, ethics and sociology, and physics, as well as his diplôme d'études supérieures (roughly equivalent to an MA) in Paris at the École Normale Supérieure (ENS), an institution of higher education that was the alma mater for several prominent French thinkers and intellectuals. (His 1928 MA thesis under the title "L'Image dans la vie psychologique: rôle et nature" ["Image in Psychological Life: Role and Nature"] was supervised by Henri Delacroix.) It was at ENS that Sartre began his lifelong, sometimes fractious, friendship with Raymond Aron. He also befriended Paul Nizan, whom he considered his alter ego during the university years and who shared his literary ambitions. Perhaps the most decisive influence on Sartre's philosophical development was his weekly attendance at Alexandre Kojève's seminars, which continued for a number of years.

From his first years in the École normale, Sartre was one of its fiercest pranksters. In 1927, his antimilitarist satirical cartoon in the revue of the school, which he co-wrote with Georges Canguilhem, particularly upset the director Gustave Lanson. In the same year, with his comrades Nizan, Larroutis, Baillou and Herland, he organized a media prank following Charles Lindbergh's successful New York City–Paris flight; Sartre and his friends called newspapers and informed them that Lindbergh was going to be awarded an honorary École degree. Many newspapers, including Le Petit Parisien, announced the event on 25 May. Thousands, including journalists and curious spectators, showed up, unaware that what they were witnessing was a stunt involving a Lindbergh look-alike. The scandal led Lanson to resign.

Around 1928, Sartre was hired as a private French tutor by the Japanese philosopher Kuki Shūzō. It is at times speculated that Kuki, who would study with Martin Heidegger and Edmund Husserl in Germany, may have been the first to stimulate Sartre's interest in phenomenology. However Sartre's engagement with Husserl's phenomenology is known to date from a later incident in 1932, when a remark on the topic by Raymond Aron, fresh from Berlin, overwhelmed Sartre during a discussion with him at the Bec de Gaz cafe in Montparnasse.

From 1931 until 1945, Sartre taught at various lycées in Le Havre (at the Lycée de Le Havre, the present-day Lycée François-1er (Le Havre), 1931–1936), Laon (at the Lycée de Laon, 1936–37), and, finally, Paris (at the Lycée Pasteur, 1937–1939, and at the Lycée Condorcet, 1941–1944; see below).

In 1932, Sartre read Voyage au bout de la nuit by Louis-Ferdinand Céline, a book that had a remarkable influence on him.

In 1933–34, he succeeded Raymond Aron at the Institut français d'Allemagne in Berlin, where he studied Edmund Husserl's phenomenological philosophy. Aron had already advised him in 1930 to read Emmanuel Levinas's Théorie de l'intuition dans la phénoménologie de Husserl (The Theory of Intuition in Husserl's Phenomenology). In 1939, Sartre published an article on Husserl's intentionality in André Gide's literary magazine La Nouvelle Revue française, which served as a manifesto for his "revolutionary" project of fusing philosophy and literature, and which won him a following among philosophy teachers. The article marked the beginning of Sartre's career as a literary critic under the wing of the journal's editor-in-chief Jean Paulhan.

The neo-Hegelian revival led by Alexandre Kojève and Jean Hyppolite in the 1930s inspired a whole generation of French thinkers, including Sartre, to discover Hegel's Phenomenology of Spirit.

=== World War II ===
In 1939, Sartre was drafted into the French Army, where he served as a meteorologist. He was captured by German troops in 1940 in Padoux, and he spent nine months as a prisoner of war—in Nancy and finally in Stalag XII-D, Trier, where he wrote his first theatrical piece, Bariona, ou le fils du tonnerre, a drama concerning Christmas. It was during this period of confinement that Sartre read Martin Heidegger's Sein und Zeit, which later became a major influence on his own essay on phenomenological ontology. Because of poor health (he claimed that his poor eyesight and exotropia affected his balance), Sartre was released in April 1941. According to other sources, he escaped after a medical visit to the ophthalmologist. Given civilian status, he recovered his teaching position at Lycée Pasteur in Neuilly, near Paris, and settled at the Hotel Mistral. In October 1941, he was given a position, previously held by a Jewish teacher who had been forbidden to teach by Vichy law, at the Lycée Condorcet in Paris.

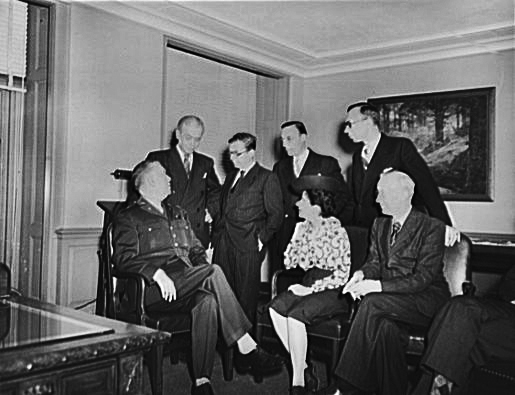
Sartre (third from left) and other French journalists visit General George C. Marshall in the Pentagon, 1945.

After coming back to Paris in May 1941, he participated in the founding of the underground group Socialisme et Liberté ("Socialism and Liberty", a continuation of his 1940 group Sous la Botte, "Under the Boot") with other writers Simone de Beauvoir, Maurice Merleau-Ponty, Jean-Toussaint Desanti, Dominique Desanti, Jean Kanapa, and École Normale students. In spring of 1941, Sartre suggested with "cheerful ferocity" at a meeting that the Socialisme et Liberté assassinate prominent war collaborators like Marcel Déat, but de Beauvoir noted his idea was rejected as "none of us felt qualified to make bombs or hurl grenades". The British historian Ian Ousby observed that the French always had far more hatred for collaborators than they did for the Germans, noting it was French people like Déat that Sartre wanted to assassinate rather than the military governor of France, General Otto von Stülpnagel, and the popular slogan always was "Death to Laval!" rather than "Death to Hitler!". In August Sartre and de Beauvoir went to the French Riviera seeking the support of André Gide and André Malraux. However, both Gide and Malraux were undecided, and this may have been the cause of Sartre's disappointment and discouragement. Socialisme et Liberté soon dissolved and Sartre decided to write instead of being involved in active resistance. He then wrote Being and Nothingness (published with Gallimard in a choice emblematic of Sartre's project of bringing philosophy to a mass public), The Flies, and No Exit, none of which were censored by the Germans, and also contributed to both legal and illegal literary magazines.

In his essay "Paris under the Occupation", Sartre wrote that the "correct" behaviour of the Germans had entrapped too many Parisians into complicity with the occupation, accepting what was unnatural as natural:

The Germans did not stride, revolver in hand, through the streets. They did not force civilians to make way for them on the pavement. They would offer seats to old ladies on the Metro. They showed great fondness for children and would pat them on the cheek. They had been told to behave correctly and be well-disciplined; they tried shyly and conscientiously to do so. Some of them even displayed a naive kindness which could find no practical expression.

Sartre noted that when Wehrmacht soldiers asked Parisians politely in their German-accented French for directions, people usually felt embarrassed and ashamed as they tried their best to help out the Wehrmacht, which led Sartre to remark: "We could not be natural." French was a language widely taught in German schools and most Germans could speak at least some French. Sartre himself always found it difficult when a Wehrmacht soldier asked him for directions, usually saying he did not know where it was that the soldier wanted to go, but still felt uncomfortable as the very act of speaking to the Wehrmacht meant he had been complicit in the Occupation. Ousby wrote: "But, in however humble a fashion, everyone still had to decide how they were going to cope with life in a fragmenting society ... So Sartre's worries ... about how to react when a German soldier stopped him in the street and asked politely for directions were not as fussily inconsequential as they might sound at first. They were emblematic of how the dilemmas of the Occupation presented themselves in daily life". Sartre wrote the very "correctness" of the Germans caused moral corruption in many people who used the "correct" behavior of the Germans as an excuse for passivity, and the very act of simply trying to live one's day-to-day existence without challenging the occupation aided the "New Order in Europe", which depended upon the passivity of ordinary people to accomplish its goals.

Throughout the occupation, it was German policy to plunder France, and food shortages were always a major problem as the majority of food from the French countryside went to Germany. Sartre wrote about the "languid existence" of the Parisians as people waited obsessively for the one weekly arrival of trucks bringing food from the countryside that the Germans allowed, writing: "Paris would grow peaked and yawn with hunger under the empty sky. Cut off from the rest of the world, fed only through the pity or some ulterior motive, the town led a purely abstract and symbolic life". Sartre himself lived on a diet of rabbits sent to him by a friend of de Beauvoir living in Anjou. The rabbits were usually in an advanced state of decay, full of maggots, and despite being hungry, Sartre once threw out one rabbit as uneatable, saying it had more maggots in it than meat. Sartre also remarked that conversations at the Café de Flore between intellectuals had changed, as the fear that one of them might be a mouche (informer) or a writer of the corbeau (anonymous denunciatory letters) meant that no one really said what they meant anymore, imposing self-censorship. Sartre and his friends at the Café de Flore had reasons for their fear; by September 1940, the Abwehr alone had already recruited 32,000 French people to work as mouches while by 1942 the Paris Kommandantur was receiving an average of 1,500 letters per day sent by the corbeaux.

Sartre wrote that under the occupation Paris had become a "sham", resembling the empty wine bottles displayed in shop windows as all of the wine had been exported to Germany, looking like the old Paris, but hollowed out, as what had made Paris special was gone. Paris had almost no cars on the streets during the occupation as the oil went to Germany while the Germans imposed a nightly curfew, which led Sartre to remark that Paris "was peopled by the absent". Sartre also noted that people began to disappear under the occupation, writing:

One day you might phone a friend and the phone would ring for a long time in an empty flat. You would go round and ring the doorbell, but no-one would answer it. If the concierge forced the door, you would find two chairs standing close together in the hall with the fag-ends of German cigarettes on the floor between their legs. If the wife or mother of the man who had vanished had been present at his arrest, she would tell you that he had been taken away by very polite Germans, like those who asked the way in the street. And when she went to ask what had happened to them at the offices in the Avenue Foch or the Rue des Saussaies she would be politely received and sent away with comforting words" [No. 11 Rue des Saussaies was the headquarters of the Gestapo in Paris].

Sartre wrote that the feldgrau ("field grey") uniforms of the Wehrmacht and the green uniforms of the Order Police which had seemed so alien in 1940 had become accepted, as people were numbed into accepting what Sartre called "a pale, dull green, unobtrusive strain, which the eye almost expected to find among the dark clothes of the civilians". Under the occupation, the French often called the Germans les autres ("the others"), which inspired Sartre's aphorism in his play Huis clos ("No Exit") of "l'enfer, c'est les Autres" ("Hell is other people"). Sartre intended the line "l'enfer, c'est les Autres" at least in part to be a dig at the German occupiers.

Sartre was a very active contributor to Combat, a newspaper created during the clandestine period by Albert Camus, a philosopher and author who held similar beliefs. Sartre and de Beauvoir remained friends with Camus until 1951, with the publication of Camus's The Rebel. Sartre wrote extensively post-war about neglected minority groups, namely French Jews and black people. In 1946, he published Anti-Semite and Jew, after having published the first part of the essay, "Portrait de l'antisémite", the year before in Les Temps modernes, No. 3. In the essay, in the course of explaining the etiology of "hate" as the hater's projective fantasies when reflecting on the Jewish question, he attacks antisemitism in France during a time when the Jews who came back from concentration camps were quickly abandoned. In 1947, Sartre published several articles concerning the condition of African Americans in the United States—specifically the racism and discrimination against them in the country—in his second Situations collection. Then, in 1948, for the introduction of Léopold Sédar Senghor's Anthologie de la nouvelle poésie nègre et malgache (Anthology of New Negro and Malagasy Poetry), he wrote "Black Orpheus" (republished in Situations III), a critique of colonialism and racism in light of the philosophy Sartre developed in Being and Nothingness. Later, while Sartre was labeled by some authors as a resistant, the French philosopher and resistant Vladimir Jankélévitch criticized Sartre's lack of political commitment during the German occupation, and interpreted his further struggles for liberty as an attempt to redeem himself. According to Camus, Sartre was a writer who resisted; not a resister who wrote.

Following the liberation of Paris in late August and the launch of épuration légale, Sartre became a member of the Commission d'épuration de la librairie et de l'édition (Commission for the Purification of Bookstores and Publishing), a body of vague legal status. In late October 1944, he met with Jean Bruller and Pierre Seghers, two fellow members of the commission, and struck a deal that suppressed the collaborationist La Nouvelle Revue française as a price for preserving its (and Sartre's own) publisher, Gallimard. That same month, Sartre assumed direction of a new editorial project for Gallimard under the banner of "committed literature" to replace the NRF, initially called La Condition humaine and renamed in December 1944 to Les Temps modernes (after Charlie Chaplin's 1936 film Modern Times).

In 1945, after the war ended, Sartre moved to an apartment on the rue Bonaparte, where he was to produce most of his subsequent work and where he lived until 1962. It was from there that he launched the first issue of the quarterly literary and political review Les Temps modernes as its editor-in-chief in October 1945, in part to popularize his own thought. His early editorials for the magazine vaguely invoked utopian socialism but kept the focus squarely on literature to continue Paulhan's project. He ceased teaching and devoted his time to writing and political activism. He would draw on his war experiences for his great trilogy of novels, Les Chemins de la Liberté (The Roads to Freedom) (1945–1949).

=== Cold War politics and anticolonialism ===
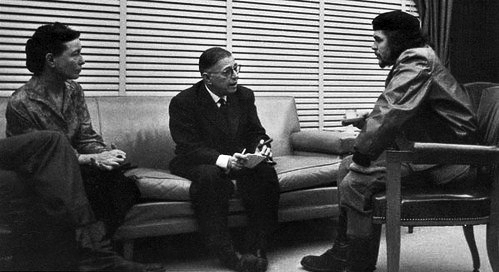
Jean-Paul Sartre (middle) and Simone de Beauvoir (left) meeting with Che Guevara (right) in Cuba, 1960

The first period of Sartre's career, defined in large part by Being and Nothingness (1943), gave way to a second period—when the world was perceived as split into communist and capitalist blocs—of highly publicized political involvement. Sartre tended to glorify the Resistance after the war as the uncompromising expression of morality in action, and recalled that the résistants were a "band of brothers" who had enjoyed "real freedom" in a way that did not exist before nor after the war. Sartre was "merciless" in attacking anyone who had collaborated or remained passive during the German occupation; for instance, criticizing Camus for signing an appeal to spare the collaborationist writer Robert Brasillach from being executed. His 1948 play Les mains sales (Dirty Hands) in particular explored the problem of being a politically "engaged" intellectual. He embraced Marxism but did not join the Communist Party. For a time in the late 1940s, Sartre described French nationalism as "provincial" and in a 1949 essay called for a "United States of Europe". In an essay published in the June 1949 edition of the journal Politique étrangère, Sartre wrote:

If we want French civilization to survive, it must be fitted into the framework of a great European civilization. Why? I have said that civilization is the reflection on a shared situation. In Italy, in France, in Benelux, in Sweden, in Norway, in Germany, in Greece, in Austria, everywhere we find the same problems and the same dangers ... But this cultural polity has prospects only as elements of a policy which defends Europe's cultural autonomy vis-à-vis America and the Soviet Union, but also its political and economic autonomy, with the aim of making Europe a single force between the blocs, not a third bloc, but an autonomous force which will refuse to allow itself to be torn into shreds between American optimism and Russian scientificism.

About the Korean War, Sartre wrote: "I have no doubt that the South Korean feudalists and the American imperialists have promoted this war. But I do not doubt either that it was begun by the North Koreans". In July 1950, Sartre wrote in Les Temps Modernes about his and de Beauvoir's attitude to the Soviet Union:

As we were neither members of the [Communist] party nor its avowed sympathizers, it was not our duty to write about Soviet labor camps; we were free to remain aloof from the quarrel over the nature of this system, provided that no events of sociological significance had occurred.

Sartre held that the Soviet Union was a "revolutionary" state working for the betterment of humanity and could be criticized only for failing to live up to its own ideals, but that critics had to take in mind that the Soviet state needed to defend itself against a hostile world; by contrast, Sartre held that the failures of "bourgeois" states were due to their innate shortcomings. The Swiss journalist François Bondy wrote that, based on a reading of Sartre's numerous essays, speeches and interviews "a simple basic pattern never fails to emerge: social change must be comprehensive and revolutionary" and the parties that promote the revolutionary charges "may be criticized, but only by those who completely identify themselves with its purpose, its struggle and its road to power", deeming Sartre's position to be "existentialist".

Sartre believed at this time in the moral superiority of the Eastern Bloc, arguing that this belief was necessary "to keep hope alive" and opposed any criticism of the Soviet Union to the extent that Maurice Merleau-Ponty called him an "ultra-Bolshevik". Sartre's expression "workers of Billancourt must not be deprived of their hopes" (Fr. "il ne faut pas désespérer Billancourt"), became a catchphrase meaning communist activists should not tell the whole truth to the workers in order to avoid decline in their revolutionary enthusiasm.

In 1954, just after Stalin's death, Sartre visited the Soviet Union, which he stated he found a "complete freedom of criticism" while condemning the United States for sinking into "prefascism". Sartre wrote about those Soviet writers expelled from the Soviet Writers' Union "still had the opportunity of rehabilitating themselves by writing better books". Sartre's comments on Hungarian revolution of 1956 are quite representative to his frequently contradictory and changing views. On one hand, Sartre saw in Hungary a true reunification between intellectuals and workers only to criticize it for "losing socialist base".

In 1964, Sartre attacked Khrushchev's "Secret Speech" which condemned the Stalinist repressions and purges. Sartre argued that "the masses were not ready to receive the truth".

In 1969, Sartre, along with 15 other prominent French writers, including Louis Aragon and Michel Butor, signed the letter of protest against the expulsion of "the writer most representative of the great Russian tradition, Aleksandr Solzhenitsyn – already a victim of Stalinist repression", from the Union of Soviet Writers.

In 1973, he argued that "revolutionary authority always needs to get rid of some people that threaten it, and their death is the only way". A number of people, starting from Frank Gibney in 1961, classified Sartre as a "useful idiot" due to his uncritical position.

Sartre came to admire the Polish leader Władysław Gomułka, a man who favored a "Polish road to socialism" and wanted more independence for Poland, but was loyal to the Soviet Union because of the Oder–Neisse line issue. Sartre's newspaper Les Temps Modernes devoted a number of special issues in 1957 and 1958 to Poland under Gomułka, praising him for his reforms. Bondy wrote of the notable contradiction between Sartre's "ultra-Bolshevism" as he expressed admiration for the Chinese leader Mao Zedong as the man who led the oppressed masses of the Third World into revolution, while also praising more moderate Communist leaders like Gomułka.

As an anti-colonialist, Sartre took a prominent role in the struggle against French rule in Algeria and the use of torture and concentration camps by the French in Algeria. He became an eminent supporter of the FLN in the Algerian War and was one of the signatories of the Manifeste des 121. Consequently, Sartre became a domestic target of the paramilitary Organisation armée secrète (OAS), escaping two bomb attacks in the early '60s. He later argued in 1959 that each French person was responsible for the collective crimes during the Algerian War of Independence. (He had an Algerian mistress, Arlette Elkaïm, who became his adopted daughter in 1965.) He opposed U.S. involvement in the Vietnam War and, along with Bertrand Russell and others, organized a tribunal intended to expose U.S. war crimes, which became known as the Russell Tribunal in 1967.

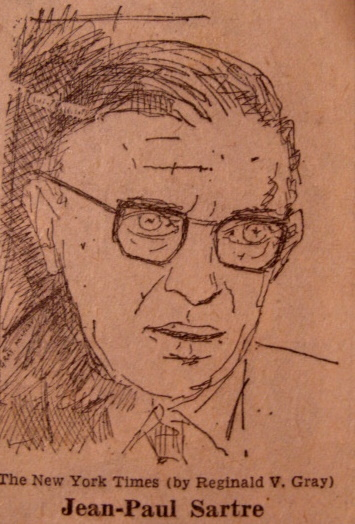
Sketch of Sartre for The New York Times by Reginald Gray, 1965

His work after Stalin's death, the Critique de la raison dialectique (Critique of Dialectical Reason), appeared in 1960 (a second volume appearing posthumously). In the Critique Sartre set out to give Marxism a more vigorous intellectual defense than it had received until then; he ended by concluding that Marx's notion of "class" as an objective entity was fallacious. Sartre's emphasis on the humanist values in the early works of Marx led to a dispute with a leading leftist intellectual in France in the 1960s, Louis Althusser, who claimed that the ideas of the young Marx were decisively superseded by the "scientific" system of the later Marx. In the late 1950s, Sartre began to argue that the European working classes were too apolitical to carry out the revolution predicated by Marx, and, influenced by Frantz Fanon, started to argue it was the impoverished masses of the Third World, the "real damned of the earth", who would carry out the revolution. A major theme of Sartre's political essays in the 1960s was his disgust with the "Americanization" of the French working class, who would much rather watch American TV shows dubbed into French than agitate for a revolution.

Sartre was a sponsor of the Fair Play for Cuba Committee. He went to Cuba in the 1960s to meet Fidel Castro and spoke with Ernesto "Che" Guevara. After Guevara's death, Sartre would declare him to be "not only an intellectual but also the most complete human being of our age" and the "era's most perfect man". Sartre would also compliment Guevara by professing that "he lived his words, spoke his own actions and his story and the story of the world ran parallel". However, he stood against the persecution of homosexuals by Castro's government, which he compared to Nazi persecution of the Jews, and said: "In Cuba there are no Jews, but there are homosexuals".

During a collective hunger strike in 1974, Sartre visited Red Army Faction member Andreas Baader in Stammheim Prison and criticized the harsh conditions of imprisonment.

=== Career as public intellectual ===
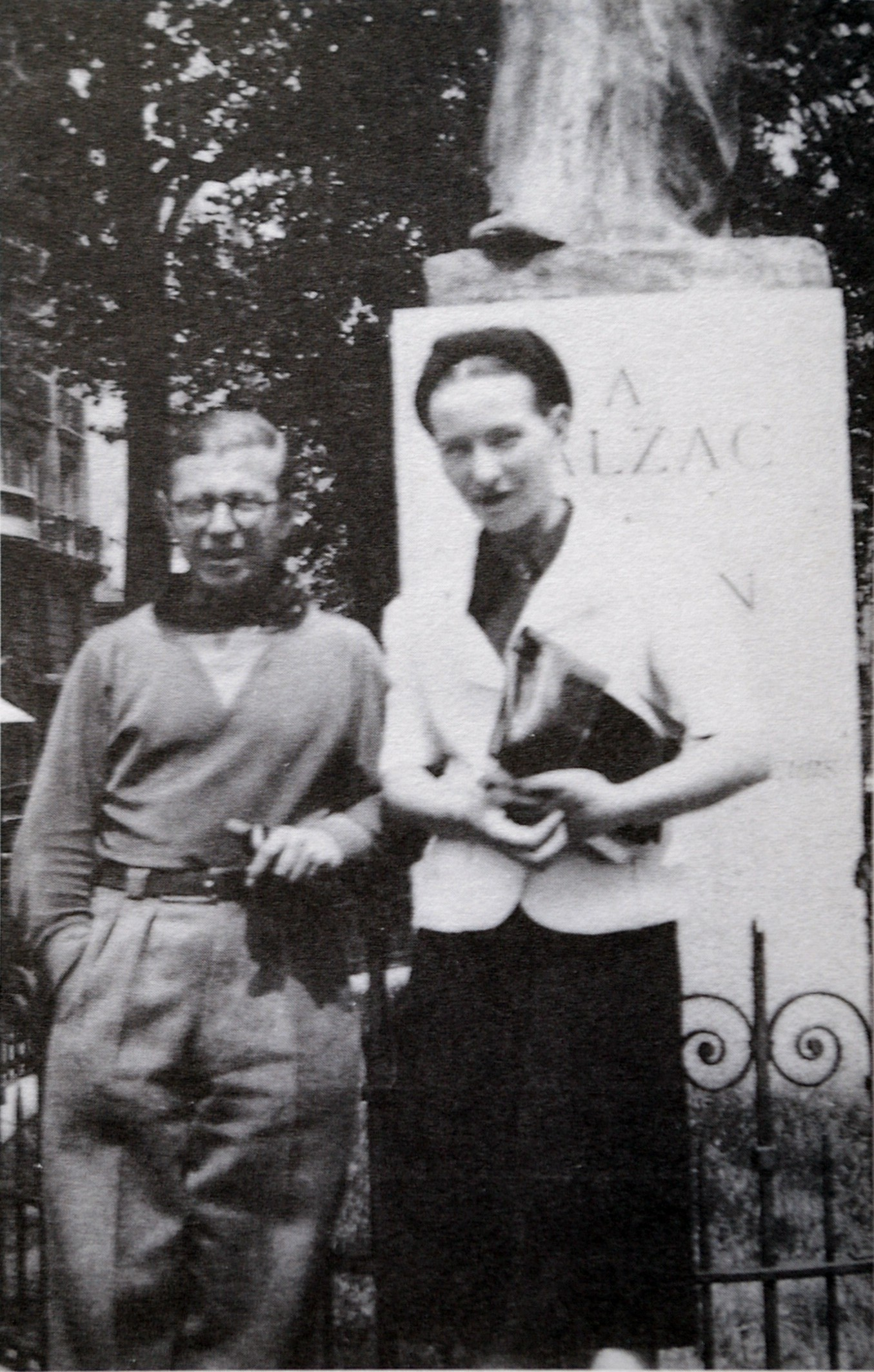
Jean-Paul Sartre and Simone de Beauvoir at the Balzac Memorial

While the broad focus of Sartre's life revolved around the notion of human freedom, he began a sustained intellectual participation in more public matters towards the end of the Second World War, around 1944–1945. Before World War II, he was content with the role of an apolitical liberal intellectual: "Now teaching at a lycée in Laon ... Sartre made his headquarters the Dome café at the crossing of Montparnasse and Raspail boulevards. He attended plays, read novels, and dined [with] women. He wrote. And he was published." Sartre and his lifelong companion, de Beauvoir, existed, in her words, where "the world about us was a mere backdrop against which our private lives were played out".

The war opened Sartre's eyes to a political reality he had not yet understood until forced into continual engagement with it: "the world itself destroyed Sartre's illusions about isolated self-determining individuals and made clear his own personal stake in the events of the time." Returning to Paris in 1941, he formed the "Socialisme et Liberté" resistance group. In 1943, after the group disbanded, Sartre joined a writers' Resistance group, in which he remained an active participant until the end of the war. He continued to write ferociously, and it was due to this "crucial experience of war and captivity that Sartre began to try to build up a positive moral system and to express it through literature".

The symbolic initiation of this new phase in Sartre's work is packaged in the introduction he wrote for a new journal, Les Temps modernes, in October 1945. Here he aligned the journal, and thus himself, with the Left and called for writers to express their political commitment. Yet, this alignment was indefinite, directed more to the concept of the Left than a specific party of the Left.

During the trial of Robert Brasillach, Sartre was among a small number of prominent intellectuals advocating for his execution for 'intellectual crimes'.

Sartre's philosophy lent itself to his being a public intellectual. He envisaged culture as a very fluid concept; neither predetermined nor definitely finished; instead, in true existential fashion, "culture was always conceived as a process of continual invention and re-invention." This marks Sartre, the intellectual, as a pragmatist, willing to move and shift stance along with events. He did not dogmatically follow a cause other than the belief in human freedom, preferring to retain a pacifist's objectivity. It is this overarching theme of freedom that means his work "subverts the bases for distinctions among the disciplines". Therefore, he was able to hold knowledge across a vast array of subjects: "the international world order, the political and economic organisation of contemporary society, especially France, the institutional and legal frameworks that regulate the lives of ordinary citizens, the educational system, the media networks that control and disseminate information. Sartre systematically refused to keep quiet about what he saw as inequalities and injustices in the world."

Sartre always sympathized with the Left. In 1948, he helped found the short-lived left-wing party known as the Rassemblement démocratique révolutionnaire (RDR); the party disbanded a year later. In the 1950s, he supported the French Communist Party (PCF) until the 1956 Soviet invasion of Hungary, despite the fact that, following the Liberation, the PCF had been infuriated by Sartre's philosophy, which appeared to lure young French men and women away from the ideology of communism and into Sartre's own existentialism. From 1956 onwards, Sartre rejected the claims of the PCF to represent the French working classes, objecting to its "authoritarian tendencies". In the late 1960s, Sartre supported the Maoists, a movement that rejected the authority of established communist parties. When the Maoist party Gauche prolétarienne (GP) was banned by the Gaullist state in 1970, promoting its newspaper La Cause du peuple and selling it on the street became a badge of honor for Sartre.

In the aftermath of a war that had for the first time properly engaged Sartre in political matters, he set forth a body of work which "reflected on virtually every important theme of his early thought and began to explore alternative solutions to the problems posed there". The greatest difficulties that he and all public intellectuals of the time faced were the increasing technological aspects of the world that were outdating the printed word as a form of expression. In Sartre's opinion, the "traditional bourgeois literary forms remain innately superior", but there is "a recognition that the new technological 'mass media' forms must be embraced" if Sartre's ethical and political goals as an authentic, committed intellectual are to be achieved: the demystification of bourgeois political practices and the raising of the consciousness, both political and cultural, of the working class.

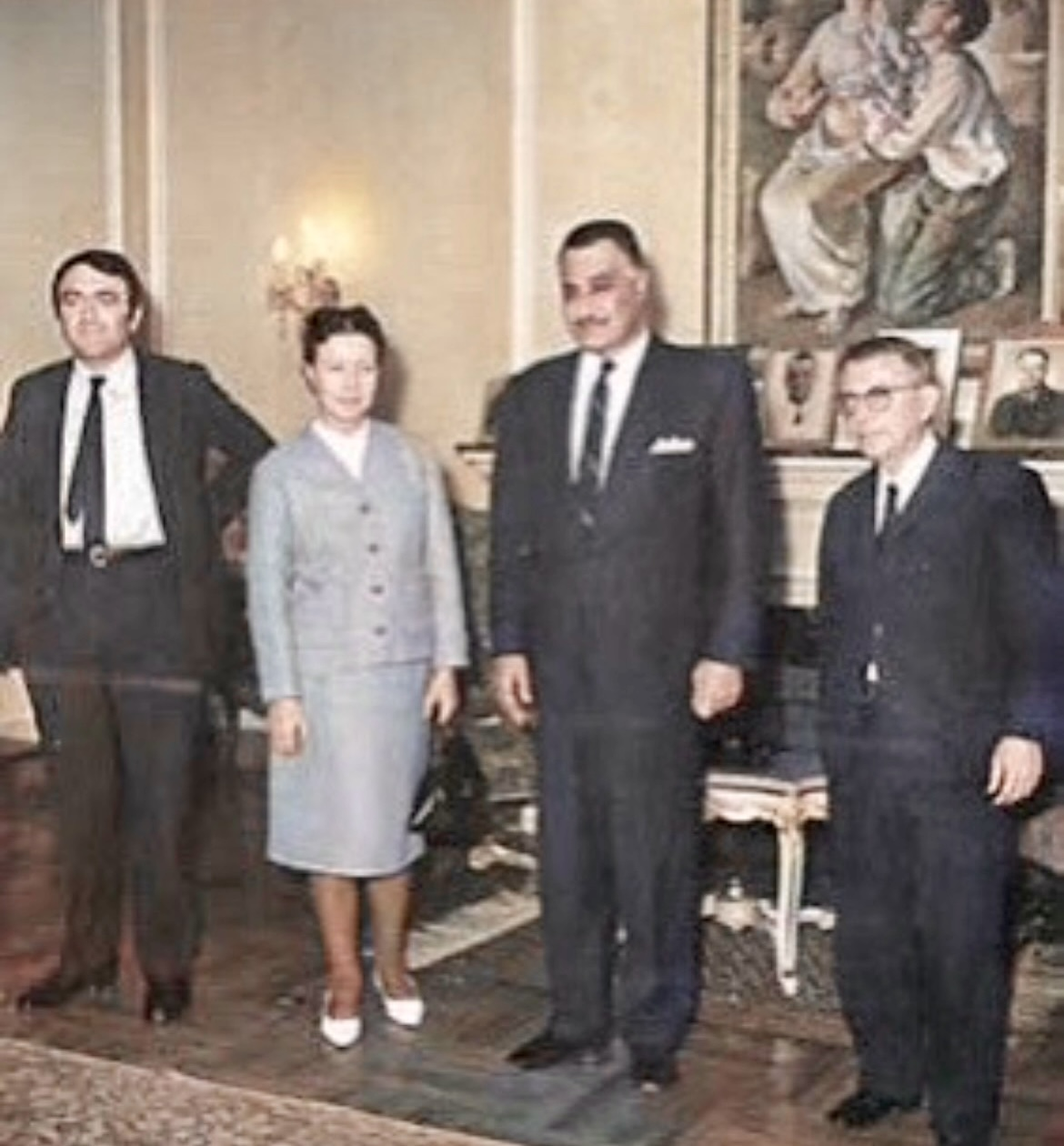
Sartre, Simone de Beauvoir and Claude Lanzmann meeting President Gamal Abdel Nasser at his home in Cairo, February 1967

The struggle for Sartre was against the monopolising moguls who were beginning to take over the media and destroy the role of the intellectual. His attempts to reach a public were mediated by these powers, and it was often these powers he had to campaign against. He was skilled enough, however, to circumvent some of these issues by his interactive approach to the various forms of media, advertising his radio interviews in a newspaper column, for example, and vice versa.

Sartre's role as a public intellectual occasionally put him in physical danger, such as in June 1961, when a plastic bomb exploded in the entrance of his apartment building. His public support of Algerian self-determination at the time had led Sartre to become a target of the campaign of terror that mounted as the colonists' position deteriorated. A similar occurrence took place the next year and he had begun to receive threatening letters from Oran, Algeria.

Sartre's role in this conflict included his comments in his preface to Frantz Fanon's The Wretched of the Earth that, "To shoot down a European is to kill two birds with one stone, to destroy an oppressor and the man he oppresses at the same time: there remains a dead man and a free man". This comment led to some criticisms from the right, such as by Brian C. Anderson and Michael Walzer. Writing for Dissent, Walzer suggested that Sartre, a European, was a hypocrite for not volunteering to be killed.

However, Sartre's stances regarding post-colonial conflict have not been entirely without controversy on the left; Sartre's preface is omitted from some editions of The Wretched of the Earth printed after 1967. The reason for this is his public support for Israel in the Six-Day War. Fanon's widow, Josie, considered Sartre's pro-Israel stance as inconsistent with the anti-colonialist position of the book, from which his preface was eventually omitted. When interviewed at Howard University in 1978, she explained, "when Israel declared war on the Arab countries [during the Six-Day War], there was a great pro-Zionist movement in favor of Israel among western (French) intellectuals. Sartre took part in this movement. He signed petitions favoring Israel. I felt that his pro-Zionist attitudes were incompatible with Fanon's work". Recent reprints of Fanon's book have generally included Sartre's preface.

=== Writing ===
Sartre wrote successfully in a number of literary modes and made major contributions to literary criticism and literary biography. His plays are richly symbolic and serve as a means of conveying his philosophy. The best-known, Huis-clos (No Exit), contains the famous line "L'enfer, c'est les autres", usually translated as "Hell is other people." Aside from the impact of Nausea, Sartre's major work of fiction was The Roads to Freedom trilogy which charts the progression of how World War II affected Sartre's ideas. In this way, Roads to Freedom presents a less theoretical and more practical approach to existentialism.

John Huston got Sartre to script his film Freud: The Secret Passion. However, it was too long, and Sartre withdrew his name from the film's credits. Nevertheless, many key elements from Sartre's script survive in the finished film.

Despite their similarities as polemicists, novelists, adapters, and playwrights, Sartre's literary work has been counterposed, often pejoratively, to that of Camus in the popular imagination. In 1948 the Catholic Church placed Sartre's œuvre on the Index Librorum Prohibitorum (List of Prohibited Books).

=== Later life and death ===
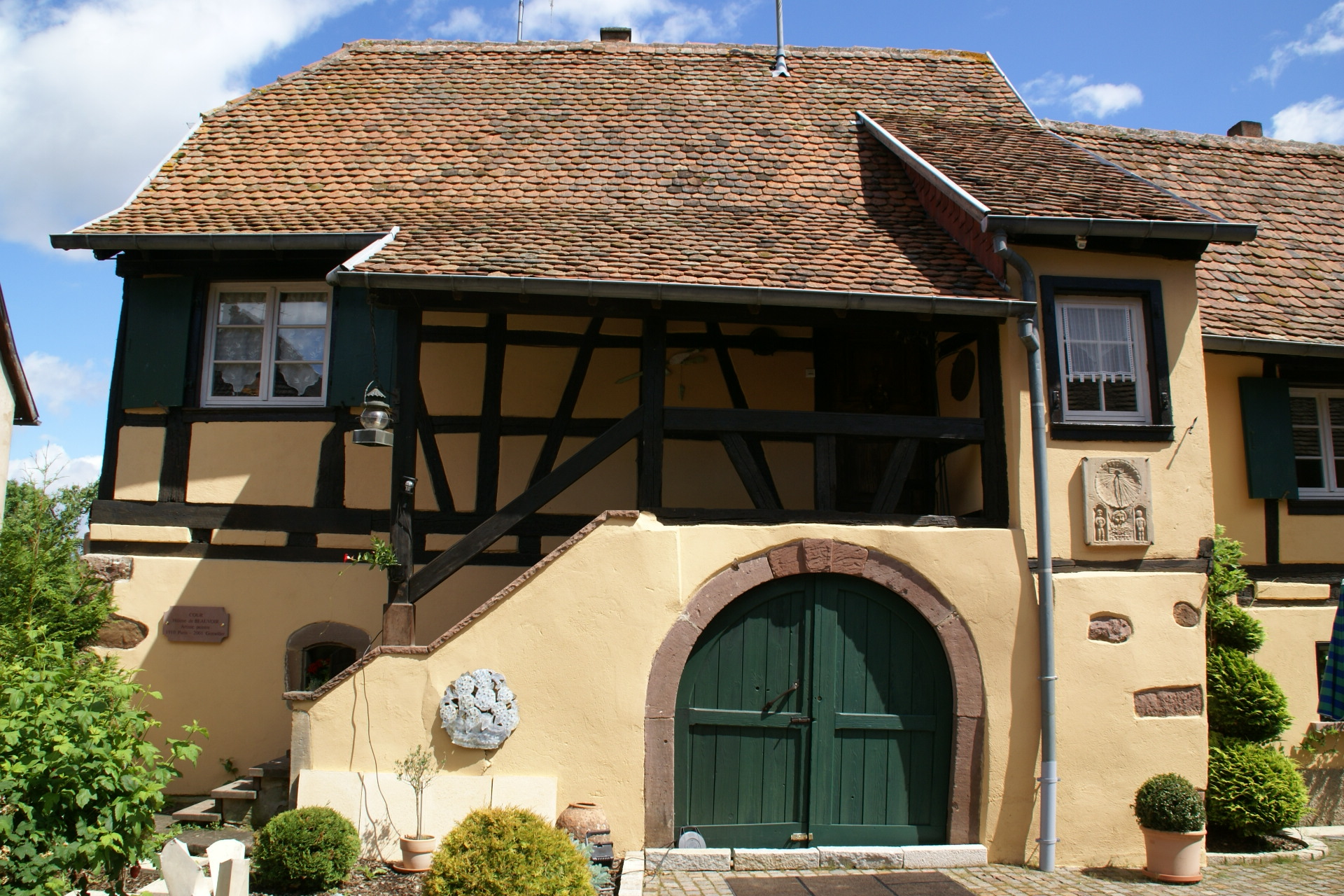
Hélène de Beauvoir's house in Goxwiller, where Sartre tried to hide from the media after being awarded the Nobel Prize

In 1964, Sartre renounced literature in a witty and sardonic account of the first ten years of his life, Les Mots (The Words). The book is an ironic counterblast to Marcel Proust, whose reputation had unexpectedly eclipsed that of André Gide (who had provided the model of littérature engagée for Sartre's generation). Literature, Sartre concluded, functioned ultimately as a bourgeois substitute for real commitment in the world. In October 1964, Sartre was awarded the Nobel Prize in Literature, but he declined it. He was the first Nobel laureate to voluntarily decline the prize, and remains one of only two laureates to do so. According to Lars Gyllensten, in the book Minnen, bara minnen ("Memories, Only Memories") published in 2000, Sartre himself or someone close to him got in touch with the Swedish Academy in 1975 with a request for the prize money, but was refused. In 1945, he had refused the Légion d'honneur. The Nobel prize was announced on 22 October 1964; on 14 October, Sartre had written a letter to the Nobel Institute, asking to be removed from the list of nominees, and warning that he would not accept the prize if awarded, but the letter went unread; on 23 October, Le Figaro published a statement by Sartre explaining his refusal. He said he did not wish to be "transformed" by such an award, and did not want to take sides in an East vs. West cultural struggle by accepting an award from a prominent Western cultural institution. Nevertheless, he was that year's prizewinner.

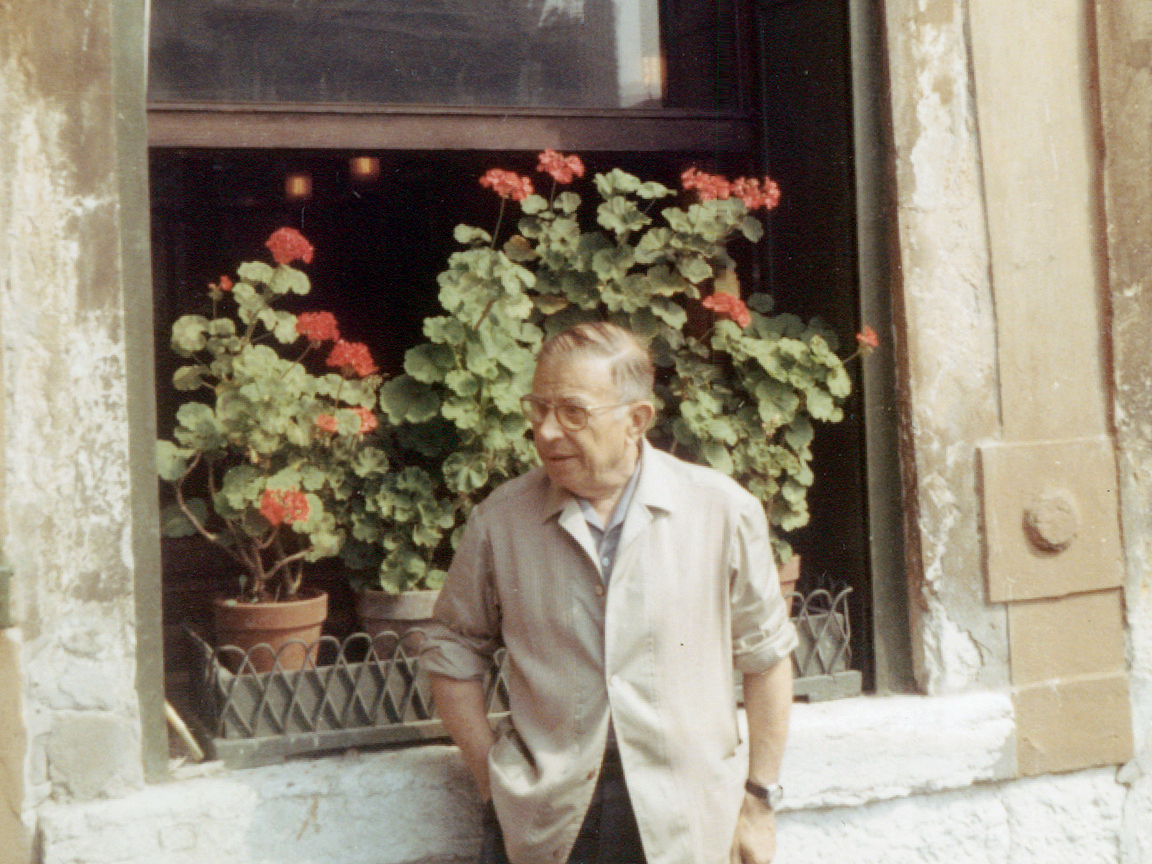
Sartre in Venice in 1967

Though his name was then a household word (as was "existentialism" during the tumultuous 1960s), Sartre remained a simple man with few possessions, actively committed to causes until the end of his life, such as the May 1968 strikes in Paris during the summer of 1968 during which he was arrested for civil disobedience. President Charles de Gaulle intervened and pardoned him, commenting that "you don't arrest Voltaire".

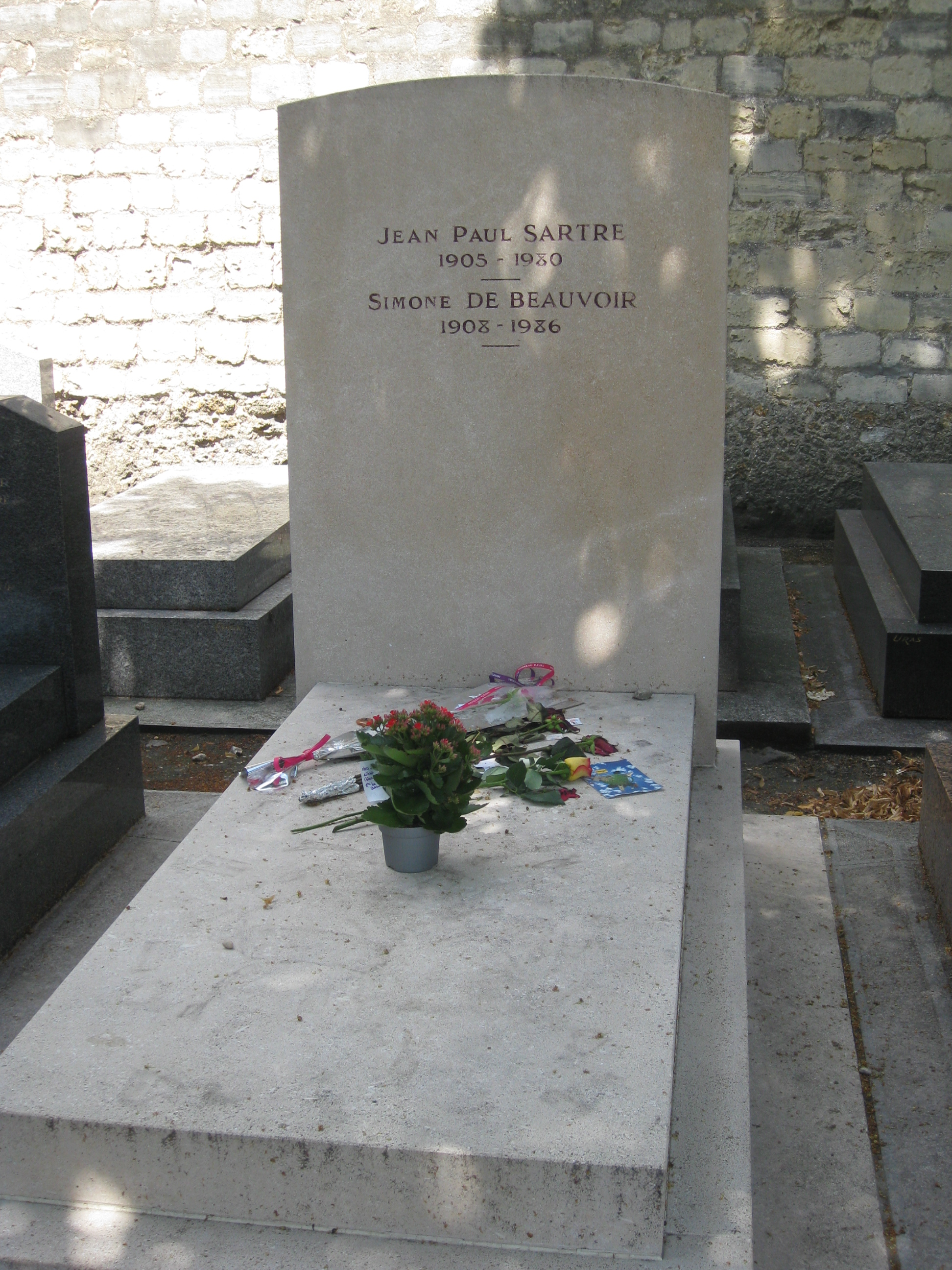
Sartre's and de Beauvoir's grave in the cimetière du Montparnasse

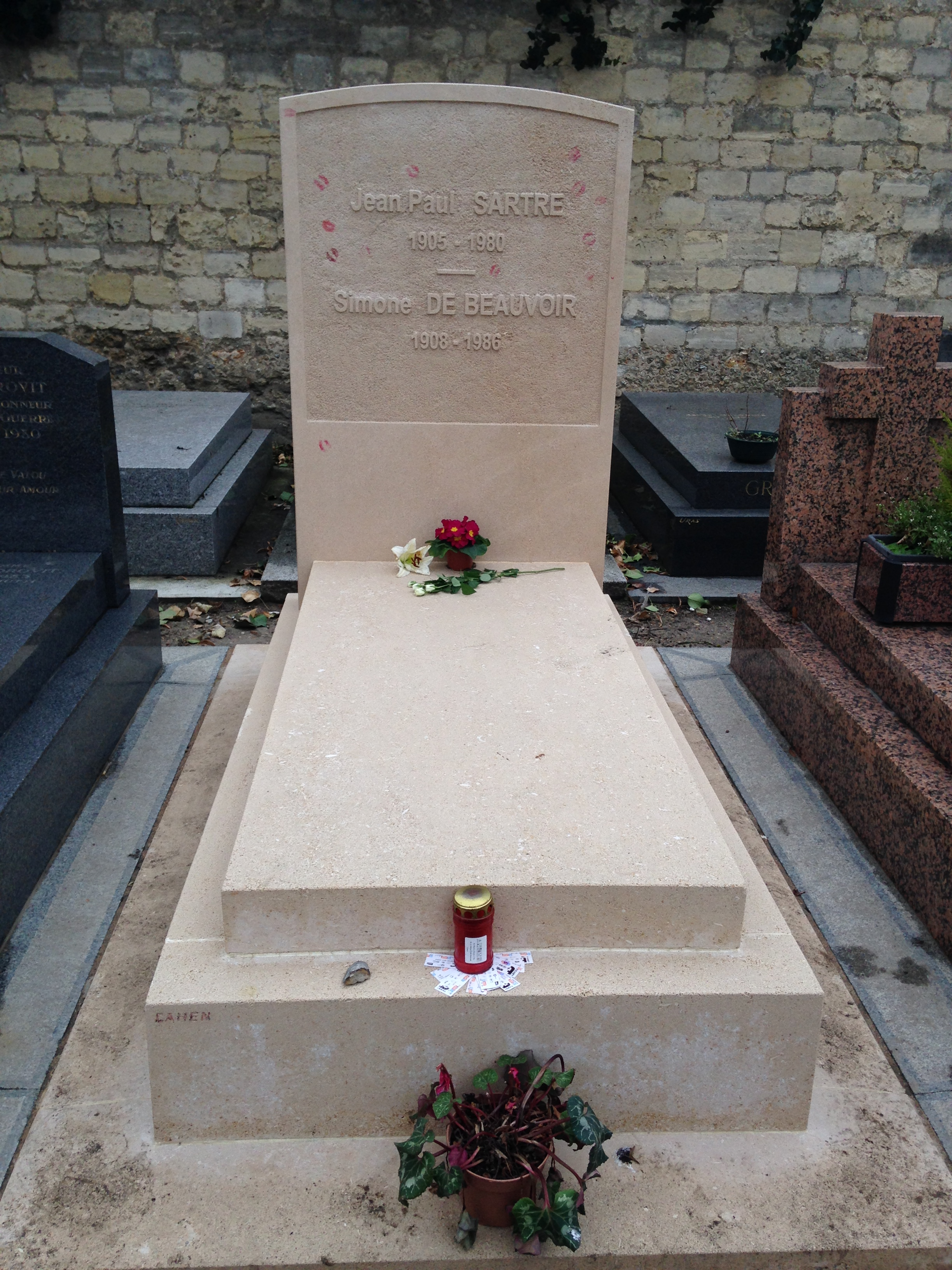
Sartre's and de Beauvoir's grave in 2016, with a new gravestone. Note the Metro tickets left by visitors.

In 1975, when asked how he would like to be remembered, Sartre replied:

I would like [people] to remember Nausea, [my plays] No Exit and The Devil and the Good Lord, and then my two philosophical works, more particularly the second one, Critique of Dialectical Reason. Then my essay on Genet, Saint Genet. ... If these are remembered, that would be quite an achievement, and I don't ask for more. As a man, if a certain Jean-Paul Sartre is remembered, I would like people to remember the milieu or historical situation in which I lived, ... how I lived in it, in terms of all the aspirations which I tried to gather up within myself.

Sartre's physical condition deteriorated, partially because of the merciless pace of work (and the use of amphetamines) he put himself through during the writing of the Critique and a massive analytical biography of Gustave Flaubert (The Family Idiot), both of which remained unfinished. He had hypertension, and became almost completely blind in 1973. Sartre was a notorious chain smoker, which could also have contributed to the deterioration of his health.

Sartre died on 15 April 1980 in Paris from pulmonary edema. He had not wanted to be buried at Père-Lachaise Cemetery between his mother and stepfather, so it was arranged that he be buried at Montparnasse Cemetery. At his funeral on Saturday, 19 April, 50,000 Parisians descended onto boulevard du Montparnasse to accompany Sartre's cortege. The funeral started at "the hospital at 2:00 p.m., then filed through the fourteenth arrondissement, past all Sartre's haunts, and entered the cemetery through the gate on the Boulevard Edgar Quinet". Sartre was initially buried in a temporary grave to the left of the cemetery gate. Four days later the body was disinterred for cremation at Père-Lachaise Cemetery, and his ashes were reburied at the permanent site in Montparnasse Cemetery, to the right of the cemetery gate.

== Philosophy ==
=== Existentialism ===
Sartre's primary idea is that people, as humans, are "condemned to be free". He explained, "This may seem paradoxical because condemnation is normally an external judgment which constitutes the conclusion of a judgment. Here, it is not the human who has chosen to be like this. There is a contingency of human existence. It is a condemnation of their being. Their being is not determined, so it is up to everyone to create their own existence, for which they are then responsible. They cannot not be free, there is a form of necessity for freedom, which can never be given up." This theory relies upon his position that there is no creator, and is illustrated using the example of the paper cutter. Sartre says that if one considered a paper cutter, one would assume that the creator would have had a plan for it: an essence. Sartre said that human beings have no essence before their existence because there is no Creator. Thus: "existence precedes essence". This forms the basis for his assertion that because one cannot explain one's own actions and behavior by referring to any specific human nature, they are necessarily fully responsible for those actions. "We are left alone, without excuse." "We can act without being determined by our past which is always separated from us."

Sartre maintained that the concepts of authenticity and individuality have to be earned but not learned. We need to experience "death consciousness" so as to wake up ourselves to what is really important: the authentic in our lives, which is life experience, not knowledge. Death draws the final point when we, as beings, cease to live for ourselves and permanently become objects that exist only for the outside world. In this way, death emphasizes the burden of our free, individual existence. "We can oppose authenticity to an inauthentic way of being. Authenticity consists in experiencing the indeterminate character of existence in anguish. It is also to know how to face it by giving meaning to our actions and by recognizing ourselves as the author of this meaning. On the other hand, an inauthentic way of being consists in running away, in lying to oneself in order to escape this anguish and the responsibility for one's own existence."

While Sartre had been influenced by Heidegger, the publication of Being and Nothingness did mark a split in their perspectives, with Heidegger remarking in Letter on Humanism:

Existentialism says existence precedes essence. In this statement he is taking existentia and essentia according to their metaphysical meaning, which, from Plato's time on, has said that essentia precedes existentia. Sartre reverses this statement. But the reversal of a metaphysical statement remains a metaphysical statement. With it, he stays with metaphysics, in oblivion of the truth of Being.

Herbert Marcuse also had issues with Sartre's metaphysical interpretation of human existence in Being and Nothingness and suggested the work projected anxiety and meaninglessness onto the nature of existence itself:

Insofar as Existentialism is a philosophical doctrine, it remains an idealistic doctrine: it hypostatizes specific historical conditions of human existence into ontological and metaphysical characteristics. Existentialism thus becomes part of the very ideology which it attacks, and its radicalism is illusory.

Sartre also took inspiration from phenomenological epistemology, explained by Franz Adler in this way: "Man chooses and makes himself by acting. Any action implies the judgment that he is right under the circumstances not only for the actor, but also for everybody else in similar circumstances." Also important is Sartre's analysis of psychological concepts, including his suggestion that consciousness exists as something other than itself, and that the conscious awareness of things is not limited to their knowledge: for Sartre intentionality applies to the emotions as well as to cognitions, to desires as well as to perceptions. "When an external object is perceived, consciousness is also conscious of itself, even if consciousness is not its own object: it is a non-positional consciousness of itself." However his critique of psychoanalysis, particularly of Freud, has faced some counter-critique. Richard Wollheim and Thomas Baldwin argued that Sartre's attempt to show that Sigmund Freud's theory of the unconscious is mistaken was based on a misinterpretation of Freud.

== Personal life ==
In 1929 at the École normale, he met Simone de Beauvoir, who studied at the Sorbonne and later went on to become a noted philosopher, writer, and feminist. The two became inseparable and lifelong companions, initiating a romantic relationship, though they were not monogamous. The first time Sartre took the agrégation, he failed. He took it a second time and virtually tied for first place with Beauvoir, although Sartre was eventually awarded first place, with Beauvoir second.

=== Relationship with Albert Camus ===
In June 1943, Sartre first met Albert Camus at the opening of Sartre's play The Flies. The two quickly became close. They often spoke of philosophy and women, corresponding frequently and spending nights in town together. In 1945, Sartre accepted an assignment by Camus's newspaper Combat to travel to America to write a series of articles. Sartre praised Camus and his work, writing in a Vogue magazine article, "In Camus’s sombre, pure works one can already detect the main traits of the French literature of the future. It offers us the promise of a classical literature, without illusions, but full of confidence in the grandeur of humanity; hard but without useless violence; passionate, without restraint … A literature that tries to portray the metaphysical condition of man while fully participating in the movements of society".

In 1951, Camus published The Rebel, in which he expressed his strong disdain for communism, political violence, and authoritarianism. Sartre reportedly disagreed with Camus, believing that violence at times was necessary in order for change to take place. This put an end to their close relationship. However, after Camus's death, Sartre wrote a eulogy for his once close friend which praised Camus for his commitment to life, consciousness, and his "stubborn" pursuit of meaning against the absurd.

== Controversy ==
=== Allegations of sexual exploitation ===
In 1993, French author Bianca Lamblin (originally Bianca Bienenfeld) wrote in her book Mémoires d'une jeune fille dérangée (Memoirs of a deranged young girl, published in English under the title A Disgraceful Affair) of her sexual exploitation by Sartre and Beauvoir. Lamblin claims that while a student at Lycée Molière, she was sexually exploited by her teacher Beauvoir, who introduced her to Sartre a year later. Bianca wrote her Mémoires in response to the posthumous 1990 publication of Jean-Paul Sartre's Lettres au Castor et à quelques autres: 1926–1963 (Letters to Castor and other friends), in which she noted that she was referred to by the pseudonym Louise Védrine. Olga Kosakiewicz and Natalie Sorokin made similar allegations against Sartre and Beauvoir.

Sartre and Beauvoir frequently followed this pattern, in which Beauvoir would seduce female students and then pass them on to Sartre.

In 1977, Sartre and his partner Simone de Beauvoir signed petitions calling for reforms to the age of consent laws in France, including the decriminalization of consensual sexual relations between adults and minors.

== Works ==
=== Novels and short story collections ===
- Nausea / La nausée (1938)
- The Wall / Le mur (1939) – collection of 5 short stories
- Hurricane over Sugar, (1960)

==== The Roads to Freedom ====
1. The Age of Reason / L'âge de raison (1945)
2. The Reprieve / Le sursis (1945)
3. Troubled Sleep (London ed. (Hamilton) has title: Iron in the Soul) / La mort dans l'âme (1949)
4. The Last Chance (1949 and 1981) – unfinished

=== Plays ===
- Bariona / Bariona, ou le fils du tonnerre (1940)
- The Flies / Les mouches (1943)
- No Exit / Huis clos (1944)
- The Respectful Prostitute / La putain respectueuse (1946)
- The Victors (Men Without Shadows) / Morts sans sépulture (1946)
- In the Mesh / L'engrénage (1948)
- Dirty Hands (Crime Passionnel, The Assassin, Red Gloves ) / Les mains sales (1948)
- Intimacy (1949)
- The Devil and the Good Lord (Lucifer and the Lord) / Le diable et le bon dieu (1951)
- Kean (1953)
- Nekrassov (1955)
- The Condemned of Altona / Les séquestrés d'Altona (1959)
- The Trojan Women / Les Troyennes (1965)

=== Screenplays ===
- Typhus, wr. 1944, pub. 2007; adapted as The Proud and the Beautiful
- The Chips Are Down / Les jeux sont faits (screenplay, dir. Jean Delannoy; 1947)
- The Crucible (screenplay, 1957; dir. Raymond Rouleau)
- Freud: The Secret Passion (screenplay, 1962; dir. John Huston; Sartre had his name removed from the film)
- The Freud Scenario / Le scénario Freud (1984)

=== Autobiographical ===
- Sartre By Himself / Sartre par lui-mème (1959)
- The Words / Les Mots (1964)
- Witness to My Life & Quiet Moments in a War / Lettres au Castor et à quelques autres (1983)
- War Diaries: Notebooks from a Phony War / Les carnets de la drole de guerre (1984)

=== Biographical ===
- The Family Idiot: Gustave Flaubert, 1821-1857 (5 vol) (1971)

=== Philosophical essays ===
- The Transcendence of the Ego / La transcendence de l'égo (1936)
- Imagination: A Psychological Critique / L'imagination (1936)
- Sketch for a Theory of the Emotions / Esquisse d'une théorie des émotions (1939)
- The Imaginary / L'imaginaire (1940)
- Being and Nothingness / L'être et le néant (1943)
- Existentialism Is a Humanism / L'existentialisme est un humanisme (1946)
- Existentialism and Human Emotions / Existentialisme et émotions humaines (1957)
- Search for a Method / Question de méthode (1957)
- Critique of Dialectical Reason / Critique de la raison dialectique (1960, 1985)
- Notebooks for an Ethics / Cahiers pour une morale (1983)
- Truth and Existence / Vérité et existence (1989)
- Anti-Semite and Jew / Réflexions sur la question juive (wr. 1944, pub. 1946)
- Baudelaire (1946)
- Situations I: Literary Critiques / Critiques littéraires (1947)
- Situations II: What Is Literature? / Qu'est-ce que la littérature ? (1947)
- "Black Orpheus" / "Orphée noir" (1948)
- Situations III (1949)
- Saint Genet, Actor and Martyr / S.G., comédien et martyr (1952)
- The Henri Martin Affair / L'affaire Henri Martin (1953)
- Situations IV: Portraits (1964)
- Situations V: Colonialism and Neocolonialism (1964)
- Situations VI: Problems of Marxism, Part 1 (1966)
- Situations VII: Problems of Marxism, Part 2 (1967)
- The Family Idiot / L'idiot de la famille (1971–72)
- Situations VIII: Autour de 1968 (1972)
- Situations IX: Mélanges (1972)
- Situations X: Life/Situations: Essays Written and Spoken / Politique et Autobiographie (1976)

== See also ==
- Corydrane
- Robert Misrahi
- Place Jean-Paul-Sartre-et-Simone-de-Beauvoir
- Sartrean terminology

== Sources ==
- Aronson, Ronald (1980). Jean-Paul Sartre – Philosophy in the World. London: NLB.
- Aronson, Ronald (2004). Camus & Sartre: The Story of a Friendship and the Quarrel That Ended It. University of Chicago Press. ISBN 978-0-226-02796-8.
- Baert, Patrick (2015). The Existentialist Moment: The Rise of Sartre as a Public Intellectual. Cambridge: Polity Press.
- Bondy, Francois (April 1967). "Jean-Paul Sartre and Politics". The Journal of Contemporary History. 2 (2): 25–48. doi:10.1177/002200946700200204. S2CID 150438929.
- Boschetti, Anna (1988). The Intellectual Enterprise: Sartre and "Les temps modernes". Evanston, IL: Northwestern University Press. ISBN 0-8101-0755-4.
- Cohen-Solal, Annie (1987). Narman MacAfee (ed.). Sartre: A Life. Translated by Anna Cancogni. New York: Pantheon Books. ISBN 978-0-394-52525-9.
- de Beauvoir, Simone (1984). Adieux: A Farewell to Sartre. Translated by Patrick O'Brian. New York: Pantheon Books. ISBN 9780394530352.
- Fulton, Ann (1999). Apostles of Sartre: Existentialism in America, 1945–1963. Evanston, IL: Northwestern University Press.
- Gerassi, John (1989). Jean-Paul Sartre: Hated Conscience of His Century. Volume 1: Protestant or Protester?. Chicago: University of Chicago Press. ISBN 978-0-226-28797-3.
- Hayman, Ronald (1992). Sartre: A Biography. New York: Carroll & Graf Publishers. ISBN 978-0-881-84875-5. (Detailed chronology of Sartre's life on pages 485–510.)
- Kirsner, Douglas (2003). The Schizoid World of Jean-Paul Sartre and R.D. Laing. New York: Karnac.
- Lecarme, Jacques (2001). "Les pouvoirs d'une grande revue". Les cahiers de médiologie. 11 (1): 55–61. ISSN 1270-0665. Archived from the original on 20 December 2020.
- Malinge, Yoann (2013). "Does our past have a motivational effect? Our reasons for acting: Sartre's philosophy of action". Vol. 4, no. 2. Ethics in Progress. pp. 46–53.
- Malinge, Yoann (2016). "Sartre, " The Transcendance of the Ego "". The Literary Encyclopedia – via Academia.
- Malinge, Yoann (2021). "Sartre, "Existentialism is a humanism"". The Literary Encyclopedia – via Academia.
- Ousby, Ian (2000). Occupation: The Ordeal of France, 1940–1944. New York: Cooper Square Press.
- Scriven, Michael (1993). Sartre and the Media. London: MacMillan Press Ltd.
- Scriven, Michael (1999). Jean-Paul Sartre: Politics and Culture in Postwar France. London: MacMillan Press Ltd.
- Thody, Philip (1964). Jean-Paul Sartre. London: Hamish Hamilton.
