= The Imaginary (Sartre) =

1940 book by Jean-Paul Sartre

The Imaginary: A Phenomenological Psychology of the Imagination
- Cover of the first edition
- Author: Jean-Paul Sartre
- Original title: L'Imaginaire: Psychologie phénoménologique de l'imagination
- Language: French
- Subject: Imagination, Imaginary
- Published: 1940 (Gallimard, in French); 1948 (Philosophical Library, in English)
- Publication place: France
- Pages: 234 (Routledge edition)
- ISBN: 0-415-11954-5 (Routledge edition)

The Imaginary: A Phenomenological Psychology of the Imagination (French: L'Imaginaire: Psychologie phénoménologique de l'imagination), also published under the title The Psychology of the Imagination, is a 1940 book by the philosopher Jean-Paul Sartre, in which the author propounds his concept of the imagination and discusses what the existence of imagination shows about the nature of human consciousness.

== Summary ==
Sartre argues that while some believe imagining to be like an internal perception, imagination is nothing like perception. Perception is our study over time of a particular object with our senses. It is necessarily incomplete; one can only see one side of a chair at a time, for example. Thus, perception involves observation. By contrast, imagination is total. In the chair that appears in our imagination, we have all sides of the chair given to us at once. However, Sartre points out that imaginary objects cannot teach us anything. The totality of the chair that appears in our imagination comes from a synthesis of our knowledge of the chair and our intention toward it. We expect the chair to be X or Y, therefore, in our imagination, it appears to us this way. Thus, Sartre calls what goes on when we picture something imaginary, "quasi-observation". Imaginary objects are a "melange of past impressions and recent knowledge" (The Imaginary 90). In short, imaginary objects are what we intend them to be. Because imaginary objects appear to us in a way which is like perception but is not perception, we have a tendency to treat them as if they were real. That is not to say we are deluded; we know that they're imaginary. But we tend to ascribe emotions, traits, and beliefs to these irreal objects as if they were real.

Throughout the book Sartre offers arguments against conceiving images as something inside a spatial consciousness. Sartre refers to this idea as the "illusion of immanence".

Sartre says that what is required for the imaginary process to occur is an analogon—that is, an equivalent of perception. This can be a painting, a photograph, a sketch, or even the mental image we conjure when we think of someone or something. Through the imaginary process, the analogon loses its own sense and takes on the sense of the object it represents. Again, we are not deluded. But at some level the photograph of my father ceases being merely colors on paper and instead stands in for my absent father. I then have a tendency to ascribe the feelings I have about my father to the picture of him. Thus, an analogon can take on new qualities based on my own intention toward it.

Ultimately, Sartre argues that because we can imagine, we are ontologically free. A consciousness that could not imagine, he points out, would be hopelessly mired in the "real", incapable of the perception of unrealized possibilities, and thus any real freedom of thought or choice. In order to imagine, a consciousness must be able to posit an object as irreal—nonexistent, absent, somewhere else and it does so always from a particular point of view. All of our engagements with the world have the potential to activate the imaginary process. And because the imaginary process relies on intentionality, the world is constituted not from the outside into our consciousness, but rather we constitute the world based on our intentions toward it.

== Editions ==
- Sartre, Jean-Paul, L'Imaginaire: Psychologie phénoménologique de l'imagination (Paris: Gallimard, 1940)
- Sartre, Jean-Paul, The Imaginary: A Phenomenological Psychology of the Imagination Translated by Jonathan Webber, (London and New York: Routledge, 2004). ISBN 978-0-415-28755-5.
