= The Transcendence of the Ego =

1936 book by Jean-Paul Sartre

- Cover of the first edition
- Author: Jean-Paul Sartre
- Original title: La Transcendance de l'ego: Esquisse d'une description phénomenologique
- Language: French
- Subject: Philosophy
- Publication date: 1936
- Publication place: France
- Media type: Print

The Transcendence of the Ego (French: La Transcendance de l'ego: Esquisse d'une description phénomenologique) is a philosophical and phenomenological essay written by the philosopher Jean-Paul Sartre in 1934 and published in 1936. The essay demonstrates Sartre’s transition from traditional phenomenological thinking and most notably his break from the philosopher Edmund Husserl’s school of thought (phenomenology), and into his own. This transition is more apparent after Sartre’s military service from 1939 where we observe a rather more sympathetic view of being in the world, a topic that is dealt with in much greater detail in his 1943 work Being and Nothingness. This essay begins Sartre's study and hybridisation of phenomenology and ontology.

The basis of the essay is to at once appreciate Husserl's description of 'intended objects' (as appearing) being described in their own right, but also to observe the ego as 'in the world' and not materially of consciousness. For Sartre, it was rather more apt to describe the ego as an object for consciousness.

== Publication history ==
"The essay [...] is Sartre's very first work. The only two publications that preceded it, in fact, cannot be considered as philosophical inquiries in the strictest sense."^{:7} It grew out of his study of Husserl at the French Institute in Berlin,^{:viii} and first appeared in the 1936–37 issue of the philosophy journal Recherches Philosophiques.

An English translation by Forrest Williams and Robert Kirkpatrick was published in 1957. Librairie Philosophique J. Vrin issued the essay in book form in French in 1966. A new English translation by Andrew Brown appeared in 2004.

== Summary ==
'Intentional objects' are objects of consciousness; that is to say, physical objects, numbers, value, the psyche, and psycho-physical persons—that Sartre agreed should be studied in their own right. It was also Sartre's view, which differed from Husserl's, that 'intentional objects' are consciousness, and that the value of intended stuffs was in consciousness of them. 'Intentional objects' are therefore both objects of consciousness and consciousness, and this is because consciousness is both itself and a reflection of itself. Sartre describes the cogito by noting that 'the consciousness which says I think'—this is the consciousness that can reflect on the mental concept of thinking—is not 'the consciousness which thinks'. So, one can think of one's own thinking, like the idea that a painting of a pipe is not an actual pipe. And, so, consciousness transcends its own properties because it includes both itself and the reflection of itself.

For Sartre, 'intentional objects' are objects for consciousness and consciousness itself, just as consciousness itself is both consciousness and reflecting consciousness. Moreover, consciousness is in the world as we are conscious of things, but we are also conscious of ourselves being conscious of things, so, things and our own consciousness of the things evoke our own reflective consciousness. Unfortunately, there exists no easier or any less mundane sounding explanation of what is meant here. It remains to be pointed out that the consciousness of reflection is not able to be reflected on. "When an external object is perceived, consciousness is also conscious of itself, even if consciousness is not its own object: it is a non-positional consciousness of itself, whereas, when an object is perceived, consciousness is a positional one. There is no need for a reflection. Consciousness is always aware of its activity and experience. This is what Sartre calls “unreflective consciousness”".

In light of this for Sartre, the constitution of the ego is 'states and actions [these intended objects we speak of] it supports'. This is to say, that the material presence of things in turn proves the ontology of the object contemplating them. Ego is then nothing without something in which to contemplate but is reliant on itself and its being. Further, the flexibility of consciousness for Sartre is the ability to contemplate something in its absence, this being special for his idea of reflection.

== Conclusion ==
He concludes that though people can contemplate the same thing, we cannot contemplate 'the intuitive apprehension' of another. This connotes the Sartrean idea of becoming apprehensive about the awareness that we are to be responsible for our own doings, and also that we can be conscious of the thing like another consciousness is conscious of the thing, but we cannot reflect on their being conscious of the thing like we can reflect on our being conscious of the thing. In this way we are still only condemned to making ourselves as we battle with our own consciousness, and so we don’t create the world, we are objects in the world.
