= The Wretched of the Earth =

1961 book by Frantz Fanon

- Cover of the first edition
- Author: Frantz Fanon
- Original title: Les Damnés de la Terre
- Translator: Constance Farrington (1963); Richard Philcox (2004)
- Language: French
- Subjects: Racism, colonialism, violence, post-colonialism, third-world development, revolution
- Publisher: François Maspero
- Publication date: 1961
- Publication place: France
- English publication date: 1963
- Media type: Print
- Pages: 251
- ISBN: 0-8021-5083-7
- OCLC: 11787563

The Wretched of the Earth (French: Les Damnés de la Terre) is a 1961 book by the philosopher Frantz Fanon, in which the author provides a psychoanalysis of the dehumanising effects of colonisation upon individuals and nations, and discusses the broader social, cultural, and political implications of establishing a social movement for the decolonisation of a person and of a people.

Some believe that the French-language title derives from the opening line of "The Internationale", (Note: French: Debout, les damnés de la terre) which is reflected in the English title as well. (Note: Translated as: "Arise, wretched of the earth".) However, Fanon biographer Adam Shatz has stated that it originates from the poem "Sales nègres" (Dirty Negroes), published posthumously in 1945 in the collection Bois-d'ébène by the Haitian poet Jacques Roumain (1907-1944).

== Summary ==
Through critiques of nationalism and of imperialism, Fanon presents a discussion of personal and societal mental health, a discussion of how the use of language (vocabulary) is applied to the establishment of imperialist identities, such as coloniser and colonised, to teach and psychologically mould the native and the colonist into their respective roles as slave and master, and a discussion of the role of the intellectual in a revolution.

Fanon proposes that revolutionaries should seek the help of the lumpenproletariat to provide the force required to effect the expulsion of the colonists. In traditional Marxist theory, the lumpenproletariats are the lowest, most degraded stratum of the proletariat—especially criminals, vagrants and the unemployed—people who lack the class consciousness to participate in the socialist revolution.

Fanon applies the term lumpenproletariat to the colonial subjects who are not involved in industrial production, especially the peasantry, because, unlike the urban proletariat (the working class), the lumpenproletariat has sufficient intellectual independence from the dominant ideology of the colonial ruling class, ready to grasp that they can revolt against the colonial status quo and so decolonise their nation. One of the essays included in The Wretched of the Earth is "On National Culture", in which Fanon highlights the necessity for each generation to discover its mission and fight for it.

== "On Violence" ==
The first section is entitled "On Violence". It is a detailed explanation of violence in relation to both the colonial world and the process of decolonisation. Fanon begins with the premise that decolonisation is, by definition, a violent process without exception. The object of that process is the eventual replacement of one group of humans with another, and that process is only complete when the transition is total. This conception of decolonisation is based on Fanon's construction of the colonial world.

Through his observations, he concluded that all colonial structures are actually nested societies which are not complementary. He uses Aristotelian logic in that the colony followed the "principle of reciprocal exclusivity". Based on this conclusion, Fanon characterises the assessment of the native population by the settler class as dehumanising. The settlers literally do not see the natives as members of the same species.

The natives are incapable of ethics and thereby are the embodiment of absolute evil as opposed to the Christian settlers who are forces of good. This is a crucial point for Fanon because it explains two phenomena that occur in the colonial world. The first is the idea that decolonisation is the replacement of one population by another, and the second is that since the native knows that they are not animals, they immediately develop a feeling of rebellion against the settler.

One of the temporary consequences of colonisation that Fanon talks about is the division of the native into three groups. The first is the native worker who is valued by the settler for their labour. The second group is what he calls the "colonised intellectual". These are, by western standards, the more educated members of the native group who are in many ways recruited by the settler to be spokespeople for their views. The settlers had "implanted in the minds of the colonised intellectual that the essential qualities remain eternal in spite of the blunders men may make: the essential qualities of the West, of course". These intellectuals were "ready to defend the Graeco-Latin pedestal" against all foes, settler or native.

The third group described by Fanon are the lumpenproletariat. This group is described in Marxism as the poorest class; those who are outside of the system because they have so little. This group is often dismissed by Marxists as unable to assist in the organising of the workers, but Fanon sees them differently. For him, the lumpenproletariat will be the first to discover violence in the face of the settler.

Once the idea of revolution is accepted by the native, Fanon describes the process by which it is debated, adjusted, and finally implemented. According to Fanon, the revolution begins as an idea of total systematic change, and through the actual application to real world situations is watered down until it becomes a small shift of power within the existing system. "[The] pacifists and legalists ... put bluntly enough the demand ... 'Give us more power'" (46), but the "native intellectual has clothed his aggressiveness in his barely veiled desire to assimilate himself to the colonial world" (47).

The colonialist bourgeoisie offers non-violence and then compromise as further ways out of the violence of decolonization. These too are mechanisms to blunt and degrade the movement. An example of this is the newly independent Republic of Gabon which gained independence from France in 1960 and afterward, the new president, Léon M'ba said "Gabon is independent, but between Gabon and France nothing has changed; everything goes on as before". (Note: quoted in Wretched of the Earth, p. 52) For Fanon, this is the perfect example of a decolonization movement which has been enfeebled by the tentativeness of its leaders. To fight this, "The newly independent Third World countries are urged not to emulate the decadent societies of the West (or East), but to chart a new path in defining human and international relationship".

In this essay, Fanon describes many aspects of the violence and response to violence necessary for total decolonization. He also offers cautions about several different approaches to that violence.

== "On National Culture" ==
In the essay "On National Culture" published in The Wretched of the Earth, Fanon sets out to define how a national culture can emerge among the former and, at the time of its release in 1961, colonized nations of Africa. Rather than depending on an orientalised, fetishised understanding of precolonial history, Fanon argues a national culture should be built on the material resistance of a people against colonial domination. Fanon narrates the essay with reference to what he calls the "colonised intellectual".

=== The return to precolonial history ===
For Fanon, colonisers attempt to write the precolonial history of a colonized people as one of "barbarism, degradation, and bestiality" to justify the supremacy of Western civilization. To upset the supremacy of the colonial society, writes Fanon, the colonised intellectual feels the need to return to their so-called "barbaric" culture, to prove its existence and its value in relation to the West.

Fanon suggests colonized intellectuals often fall into the trap of trying to prove the existence of a common African or "Negro" culture. This is a dead end, according to Fanon, because it was originally the colonists who essentialized the peoples in Africa as "Negro", without considering distinct national cultures and histories. This points to what Fanon sees as one of the limits of the Négritude movement. In articulating a continental identity, based on the colonial category of the "Negro", Fanon argues "the men who set out to embody it realized that every culture is first and foremost national".

An attempt among colonized intellectuals to "return" to the nation's pre-colonial culture is then ultimately an unfruitful pursuit, according to Fanon. Rather than culture, the intellectual emphasizes traditions, costumes, and clichés, which romanticize history in a similar way as the colonist would. The desire to reconsider the nation's pre-colonial history, even if it results in orientalized clichés, still marks an important turn according to Fanon, since by rejecting the normalized eurocentrism of colonial thought, these intellectuals provide a "radical condemnation" of the larger colonial enterprise.

This radical condemnation attains its full meaning when we consider that the "final aim of colonization", according to Fanon, "was to convince the indigenous population that it would save them from darkness". A persistent refusal among Indigenous peoples to admonish national traditions in the face of colonial rule, according to Fanon, is a demonstration of nationhood, but one that holds on to a fixed idea of the nation as something of the past, a corpse.

=== Struggle as the site of national culture ===
Ultimately, Fanon argues that the colonised intellectual will have to realise that a national culture is not a historical reality waiting to be uncovered in a return to pre-colonial history and tradition, but is already existing in the present national reality. National struggle and national culture then become inextricably linked in Fanon's analysis. To struggle for national liberation is to struggle for the terrain whereby a culture can grow, since Fanon concludes a national culture cannot exist under conditions of colonial domination.

A decisive turn in the development of the colonized intellectual is when they stop addressing the oppressor in their work and begin addressing their own people. This often produces what Fanon calls "combat literature", writing that calls upon the people to undertake the struggle against the colonial oppressor. This change is reflected in all modes of artistic expression among the colonized nation, from literature to pottery, to ceramics, and oral story-telling. Fanon specifically uses the example of Algerian storytellers changing the content and narration of their traditional stories to reflect the present moment of struggle against French colonial rule.

He considers the bebop jazz movement in America as a similar turn, whereby black jazz musicians began to delink themselves from the image imposed on them by a white-Southern imaginary. Whereas the common trope of African-American jazz musicians was, according to Fanon, "an old 'Negro', five whiskeys under his belt, bemoaning his misfortune", bebop was full of energy and dynamism that resisted and undermined the common racist trope.

For Fanon, national culture is then intimately tied to the struggle for the nation itself, the act of living and engaging with the present reality that gives birth to the range of cultural productions. This might be best summarized in Fanon's idea of replacing the "concept" with the "muscle". Fanon is suggesting that the actual practice and exercise of decolonization, rather than decolonization as an academic pursuit, is what forms the basis of national culture.

=== Towards an international consciousness ===
In concluding the essay, Fanon is careful to point out that building a national culture is not an end in itself, but a "stage" toward larger international solidarity. The struggle for national culture induces a break from the inferior status that was imposed on the nation by the process of colonization, which in turn produces a "national consciousness". This national consciousness, born of struggle undertaken by the people, represents the highest form of national culture, according to Fanon. Through this process, the liberated nation emerges as an equal player on the international stage, where an international consciousness can discover and advance a set of universalizing values.

== Reception ==
In his preface to the 1961 edition of The Wretched of the Earth, Jean-Paul Sartre supported Frantz Fanon's advocacy of violence by the colonized people against the colonizer, as necessary for their mental health and political liberation. Sartre later applied that introduction in Colonialism and Neocolonialism (1964), a politico–philosophic critique of France's Algerian colonialism. The political focus derives from the first chapter of the book, "On Violence", wherein Fanon indicts colonialism and its postcolonial legacies, for which violence is a means of catharsis and liberation from being a colonial subject. In the foreword to the 2004 edition of The Wretched of the Earth, Homi K. Bhabha criticized Sartre's introduction, stating that it limits the reader's approach to the book to focus on its promotion of violent resistance to oppression.

After 1967, in the wake of Sartre's support for Israel in the Six-Day War, the introduction by Sartre was removed from new editions by Fanon's widow, Josie. Interviewed in 1978 at Howard University, she said, "when Israel declared war on the Arab countries, there was a great pro-Zionist movement in favor of Israel among western (French) intellectuals. Sartre took part in this movement. He signed petitions favoring Israel. I felt that his pro-Zionist attitudes were incompatible with Fanon's work".

Fanon's writing on culture has inspired much of the contemporary postcolonial discussions on the role of the national culture in liberation struggles and decolonization. In particular, Robert J. C. Young partially credits Fanon for inspiring an interest about the way the individual human experience and cultural identity are produced in postcolonial writing. Fanon's theorizing of national culture as first and foremost a struggle to overthrow colonial rule was a radical departure from other considerations of culture that took a more historical and ethnographic view.

=== Criticism ===
Some theorists working in postcolonial studies have criticized Fanon's commitment to the nation as reflective of an essentialist and authoritarian tendency in his writing. In response to "On National Culture", Christopher L. Miller, professor of African-American studies and French at Yale University, faults Fanon for viewing the nation as the unquestioned site of anti-colonial resistance, since national borders were imposed on African peoples during the Scramble for Africa.

According to Miller, the lack of attention to the imposition and artificiality of national borders in Africa overlooks the cultural and linguistic differences of each country that make theorizing a unified national culture, as Fanon does, problematic. Miller also criticizes Fanon for following much of "post-Enlightenment Western thought" by treating particular or local histories as subordinate to the universal or global struggle of the nation.

Neil Lazarus, professor at the University of Warwick, has suggested that Fanon's "On National Culture" overemphasizes a sense of unified political consciousness onto the peasantry in their struggle to overthrow colonial systems of power. In particular, Lazarus argues that the idea of a "national consciousness" does not align with the history of the Algerian Revolution, in which Fanon was highly involved, since when the country gained independence in 1962 after an eight-year liberation war, the population was largely demobilized. In Lazarus's view, the peasant militancy in Fanon's analysis becomes the exact justification for his theory, yet does not necessarily exist in the material sense.

In the foreword to the 2004 edition of Wretched of the Earth, Bhabha also pointed to some of the dangers of Fanon's analysis in "On National Culture". He wrote that Fanon's dedication to a national consciousness can be read as a "deeply troubling" demand for cultural homogeneity and the collapse of difference. Bhabha suggests Fanon's vision is one of strategy and any focus on the homogeneity of the nation should not be interpreted as "narrow-minded nationalism", but an attempt to break the imposed Cold War era binaries of capitalism vs. socialism or East vs. West.

=== Strategic essentialism ===
Some scholars have noted the similarities between Fanon's conception of national culture and strategic essentialism. Strategic essentialism is a popular concept in postcolonial studies, which was coined by Gayatri Chakravorty Spivak in the 1980s. The concept acknowledges the impossibility of defining a set of essential attributes to a group or identity, while also acknowledging the importance of some kind of essentialism in order to mobilize for political action. This resonates with Fanon's argument in "On National Culture", since any essentialism of national cultural identity was basically a strategic step towards overcoming the assimilation of colonialism, and building an international consciousness where binaries of colonized and colonizer were dissolved.

=== Relationship to the Négritude movement ===
"On National Culture" is also a notable reflection on Fanon's complex history with the Négritude movement. Aimé Césaire, Fanon's teacher and an important source of intellectual inspiration throughout his career, was the co-founder of the movement. While Fanon's thinking often intersected with figures associated with Négritude, including a commitment to rid humanism of its racist elements and a general dedication to Pan-Africanism in various forms, "On National Culture" was rather critical of the Négritude movement especially considering its historical context. The last section of the essay was initially drafted as a speech for the Second Congress of Black Writers and Artists in Rome: "The Unity and Responsibilities of African Negro Culture" (1959). The problems and solutions presented by the congress, inspired as they were by the movement, often revolved around the presumption that a unified African Negro culture existed. Alioune Diop, speaking as one of the key figures of the movement at the conference, said Négritude intended to enliven black culture with qualities indigenous to African history, but made no mention of a material struggle or a nationalist dimension.

Meanwhile, throughout the essay, Fanon stressed the cultural differences between African nations and the particular struggles black populations were facing, which required material resistance on a national level. In a portion of the essay written after he delivered the speech at the conference, Fanon was especially critical of prominent Négritude writers and politicians Jacques Rabemananjara and Léopold Sédar Senghor, who called for black cultural unity yet opposed Algeria's bid for independence at the United Nations.

== English and other translations ==
- in English by Constance Farrington (Présence Africaine, 1963)
- in English by Constance Farrington (Grove Press, 1965)
- in English by Constance Farrington (Penguin Books, 2001)
- in English by Richard Philcox (Grove Press, 2004)
- in Zulu by Makhosazana Xaba (Inkani Books, 2024)

== See also ==
- Discovery doctrine
