= Critique of Dialectical Reason =

1960 book by Jean-Paul Sartre

- Cover of the first edition
- Author: Jean-Paul Sartre
- Original title: Critique de la raison dialectique
- Translator: Alan Sheridan-Smith
- Language: French
- Subject: Marxism
- Publisher: Éditions Gallimard
- Publication date: 1960 (vol. 1); 1985 (vol. 2)
- Publication place: France
- English publication date: 1976 (vol. 1); 1991 (vol. 2)
- Media type: Print (Hardcover and Paperback)
- Pages: 835 (English ed., vol. 1); 467 (English ed., vol. 2)
- ISBN: 0-86091-757-6 (vol. 1); 0-86091-311-2 (vol. 2)

Critique of Dialectical Reason (French: Critique de la raison dialectique) is a 1960 book by the philosopher Jean-Paul Sartre, in which the author further develops the existentialist Marxism he first expounded in his essay Search for a Method (1957). Critique of Dialectical Reason and Search for a Method were written as a common manuscript, with Sartre intending the former to logically precede the latter. Critique of Dialectical Reason was Sartre's second large-scale philosophical treatise, Being and Nothingness (1943) having been the first. The book has been seen by some as an abandonment of Sartre's original existentialism, while others have seen it as a continuation and elaboration of his earlier work. It was translated into English by Alan Sheridan-Smith.

The first volume, "Theory of Practical Ensembles", was first published in English in 1976; a corrected English translation was published in 1991, based on the revised French edition of 1985. The second volume, "The Intelligibility of History", was published posthumously in French in 1985 with an English translation by Quintin Hoare appearing in 1991.

Sartre is quoted as having said this was the principal of his two philosophical works for which he wished to be remembered.

== Background ==
In the wake of Being and Nothingness, Sartre became concerned with reconciling his concept of freedom with concrete social subjects and was strongly influenced in this regard by his friend and associate Maurice Merleau-Ponty, whose writings in the late 1940s and early 1950s, including Sense and Non-Sense, were pioneering a path towards a synthesis of existentialism and Marxism. Merleau-Ponty, however, then became increasingly skeptical of Marxism, culminating in his Adventures of the Dialectic (1955), while Sartre continued to grow more engaged with Marxist thought. Though Sartre had, by 1957, decisively broken with the Soviet Union and "official" Marxism in the wake of the Soviet suppression of the Hungarian uprising, he nonetheless declared Marxism "the philosophy of our time" and stated the need to resuscitate it from the moribund state that Soviet dogma had left it in, a need he attempted to answer by writing Critique of Dialectical Reason. The conflict between Sartre and Merleau-Ponty on this issue ended their long-standing friendship, though Ronald Aronson states that, in part, Critique of Dialectical Reason was Sartre's answer to his former friend and political mentor's attack on Marxism.

More generally, Critique of Dialectical Reason was written following the rejection of Communism by leftist French intellectuals sympathetic to Marxism, a process that not only ended Sartre's friendship with Merleau-Ponty but with Albert Camus as well. The work was part of Sartre's attempt to learn "the lessons of history" from these events, and to try to create an adequate Marxist history and sociology.

== Summary ==
Critique of Dialectical Reason is the product of a later stage in Sartre's thinking, during which he no longer identified Marxism with the Soviet Union or French Communism but came closer to identifying as a Marxist. In it, Sartre puts forward a revision of existentialism, and an interpretation of Marxism as a contemporary philosophy par excellence, one that can be criticized only from a reactionary pre-Marxist standpoint.

Sartre argues that while the free fusion of many human projects may possibly constitute a Communist society, there is no guarantee of this. Conscious human acts are not projections of freedom that produce human 'temporality', but movements toward 'totalization', their sense being co-determined by existing social conditions. People are thus neither absolutely free to determine the meaning of their acts nor slaves to the circumstances in which they find themselves. Social life does not consist only of individual acts rooted in freedom since it is also a sedimentation of history by which we are limited and a fight with nature, which imposes further obstacles and causes social relationships to be dominated by scarcity. Every satisfaction of a need can cause antagonism and make it more difficult for people to accept each other as human beings. Scarcity deprives people of the ability to make particular choices and diminishes their humanity. Communism will restore the freedom of the individual and his/her ability to recognize the freedom of others.

== Reception ==
From the time the Critique of Dialectical Reason was published in 1960, there has been much discussion about where it stands in relation to Sartre's earlier, seminal work, Being and Nothingness. Some Sartre scholars and critics, like George Kline, see the work as essentially a repudiation of Sartre's existentialist stance. Marjorie Grene thinks that the Critique of Dialectical Reason can be readily translated into the categories of Being and Nothingness. Hazel Barnes and Peter Caws see a shift in emphasis between the two works but not a difference of kind. Barnes observes that the title Critique of Dialectical Reason "suggests both Kant and Hegel." According to Barnes, the Critique of Dialectical Reason resembles Kant's Critique of Pure Reason in that it is concerned "with the nature, possibilities, and limitations of human reason." She sees this as the only similarity, however, since Sartre's interests are not primarily epistemological or metaphysical and he is more indebted to Hegel than to Kant. Josef Catalano argues that the Critique of Dialectical Reason gives a historical and social dimension to the being-for-itself described in Being and Nothingness. Finally, Fredric Jameson believes that a reading of the Critique forever alters our view of what Sartre meant in Being and Nothingness, that the label "existentialist" as applied to Sartre can no longer have its previous meaning.

Sartre's analysis of "groups-in-fusion" (people brought together by a common cause) resonated with the events of the May–June 1968 uprising in France and allowed him to sideline for a while the competing influence of Louis Althusser's structuralist interpretation of Marxism. Situating the Critique of Dialectical Reason in the context of May–June 1968, the psychoanalyst Didier Anzieu stated that "Sartre first described in his book the passive and anonymous forms of individual alienation--this is what he calls the 'practico-inert'--and then he showed how a group introduces negation into history and shapes itself (instead of being shaped), invents itself by breaking with this passive and anonymous society that an American sociologist called 'the lonely crowd.' The students who sparked the outbreak of the revolution of the spring of 1968 were shaped by, if not this second Sartrean philosophy, at least a dialectical philosophy of history. May of 1968 is the historical upsurge of a 'wild-flowering' force of negation. It is the inroad of 'Sartrean' freedom, not that of the isolated individual but the creative freedom of groups."

The philosopher Sidney Hook described the work as a philosophical justification for widespread human rights abuses by the Communist leadership of the Soviet Union. The psychiatrists R. D. Laing and David Cooper consider the Critique of Dialectical Reason an attempt to provide a dialectical basis for structural anthropology, and to establish through a dialectical approach the limits of dialectical reason. Gilles Deleuze and Félix Guattari endorsed Sartre's view that there is no "class spontaneity" but only "group spontaneity".

Leszek Kołakowski argues that the Critique of Dialectical Reason represents an abandonment of Sartre's original existentialism and that it absurdly depicts Marxism as "invincible". Kołakowski nevertheless considers the book an interesting attempt to find room for creativity and spontaneity within Marxism, noting that Sartre rejects the dialectic of nature and historical determinism while preserving the social significance of human behavior. Kołakowski criticizes Sartre for failing to explain how Communism could restore freedom. In his view, Sartre gives such a generalized account of revolutionary organization that he ignores the real difficulties of groups engaging in common action without infringing the freedom of their individual members. Kołakowski criticizes Sartre for introducing many superfluous neologisms, writing that aside from these he does not provide a genuinely new interpretation of Marxism; he sees Sartre's view of the historical character of perception and knowledge and its rejection of the dialectic of nature as stemming from the work of György Lukács. In his view, neither Sartre's view that freedom must be safeguarded in revolutionary organization nor his view that there will be perfect freedom when Communism has abolished shortages is new in a Marxist context, and Sartre fails to explain how either could have been brought about.

The conservative philosopher Roger Scruton writes that the Critique of Dialectical Reason "shows a total rejection of the rules of intellectual enquiry—a determined flight from the rule of truth. To suppose that the book might actually fulfill the promise offered by its title is in fact a gross impertinence."

== See also ==
- Corydrane
