= Anti-Semite and Jew =

1946 book by Jean-Paul Sartre

- Cover of the French edition
- Author: Jean-Paul Sartre
- Original title: Réflexions sur la question juive
- Translator: George J. Becker
- Language: French
- Subject: Antisemitism
- Publisher: Editions Morihien
- Publication date: 1946
- Publication place: France
- English publication date: 1948
- Media type: Print
- Pages: 153
- ISBN: 0-8052-1047-4

Anti-Semite and Jew (French: Réflexions sur la question juive, "Reflections on the Jewish Question") is an essay about antisemitism written by Jean-Paul Sartre shortly after the Liberation of Paris from German occupation in 1944. The first part of the essay, "The Portrait of the Antisemite", was published in December 1945 in Les Temps modernes. The full text was then published in 1946.

The essay analyzes four characterisations and their interactions: The antisemite, the democrat, the authentic Jew, and the inauthentic Jew. It explains the etiology of hate by analyzing antisemitic hate. According to Sartre, antisemitism (and hate more broadly) is, among other things, a way by which the middle class lay claim to the nation in which they reside, and an oversimplified conception of the world in which the antisemite sees "not a conflict of interests but the damage an evil power causes society."

The essay deals not with racist hatred of living Jews, but with Judaism and imaginary Jews as a category of fantasy projected in the thought of the antisemite, a phenomenon described as antijudaism by intellectual historian David Nirenberg in citing this essay and its salient observation that "if the Jew did not exist, the anti-semite would invent him."

== Summary ==
=== Definition of antisemitism ===
Sartre begins by defining antisemitism as characterized by certain beliefs: attributing "all or part of his own misfortunes and those of his country to the presence of Jewish elements in the community, ... proposes to remedy this state of affairs by depriving the Jews of certain of their rights, by keeping them out of certain economic and social activities, by expelling them from the country, by exterminating all of them ...." He then describes the concept that these antisemitic beliefs are produced by external causes, such as the experience of objective situations involving Jews. Sartre states that these non-contradictory conceptions are "dangerous and false" and refuses to "characterize as opinion a doctrine that is aimed directly at particular persons and that seeks to suppress their rights or to exterminate them."

Sartre argues that antisemitism is not an "idea" in the commonly understood sense of the word: it is not a point of view based rationally upon empirical information calmly collected and calibrated in as objective a manner as is possible. Sartre states that "It is first of all a passion." It is also often a deep passion, "Some men are suddenly struck with impotence if they learn from the woman with whom they are making love that she is a Jewess. It is an involvement of the mind, but one so deep-seated and complex that it extends to the physiological realm, as happens in cases of hysteria."

Sartre tells of a classmate of his who complained that he had failed the agrégation exam while a Jew, the son of eastern immigrants, had passed. There was – said Sartre's classmate – no way that that Jew could understand French poetry as well as a true Frenchman. But Sartre's classmate admitted that he disdained the agrégation and had not studied for it. "Thus to explain his failure, he made use of two systems of interpretation… His thoughts moved on two planes without his being in the least bit embarrassed by it." Sartre's classmate had adopted in advance a view of Jews and of their role in society. "Far from experience producing his idea of the Jew, it was the latter that explained his experience. If the Jew did not exist, the anti-Semite would invent him." Antisemitism is a view that arises not from experience or historical fact, but from itself. It lends new perspective to experience and historical fact. The antisemite convinces himself of beliefs that he knows to be spurious at best.

=== Bad faith ===
Sartre deploys his concept of bad faith as he develops his argument. For Sartre, the antisemite has escaped the insecurity of good faith, the impossibility of sincerity. He has abandoned reason and embraced passion. Sartre comments that, "It is not unusual for people to elect to live a life of passion rather than of reason. But ordinarily they love the objects of passion: women, glory, power, money. Since the anti-Semite has chosen hate, we are forced to conclude that it is the state of passion that he loves." He chooses to reason from passion, to reason falsely "because of the longing for impenetrability. The rational man groans as he gropes for the truth; he knows that reasoning is no more than tentative, that other considerations may intervene to cast doubt on it." Antisemites are attracted by "the durability of a stone." What frightens them is the uncertainty of truth. "The anti-Semite has chosen hate because hate is a faith." He has escaped responsibility and doubt. He can blame anything on the Jew; he does not need to engage reason, for he has his faith.

The antisemite is a prime example of a person who has entered into bad faith to avoid responsibility. He attempts to relinquish his responsibility to antisemitism and a community of antisemites. He "fears every kind of solitariness… however small his stature, he takes every precaution to make it smaller, lest he stand out from the herd and find himself face to face with himself. He has made himself an anti-Semite because that is something one cannot be alone." Antisemitism is a way of feeling good, proud even, rather than guilty at the abandonment of responsibility and the flight before the impossibility of true sincerity. The antisemite abandons himself to the crowd and his bad faith, he "flees responsibility as he flees his own consciousness, and choosing for his personality the permanence of the rock, he chooses for his morality the scale of petrified values." He pulls down shutters, blinds, mirrors and mirages over his consciousness to keep himself in his bad faith away from his responsibilities and his liberty. The antisemite is afraid "of himself, of his own consciousness, of his own liberty, of his instincts, of his responsibilities, of solitariness, of change, of society, and the world – of everything except the Jews." He is "a coward who does not want to admit his cowardice to himself." The antisemite wallows in the depths of an extreme bad faith. "Anti-Semitism, in short, is fear of the human condition. The anti-Semite is a man who wishes to be pitiless stone, a furious torrent, a devastating thunderbolt – anything except a man." This is his bad faith.

=== The democrat and the Jew ===
In his essay Anti-Semite and Jew, Jean-Paul Sartre explores the relationship between the Jew, the anti-Semite, and the democrat. Sartre characterizes the Democrat as the believer in Enlightenment reason and the natural equality of man. But by insisting on universal rights of humanity while denying the Jew his identity as a Jew, the democrat is blind to the true effects of anti-Semitism. While the anti-Semite creates the Jew to destroy him, the democrat negates the Jew to pretend the problem of anti-Semitism does not exist.

=== Jewishness and antisemitism ===
In the final section of Anti-Semite and Jew, Sartre turns to consider the Jew. First he goes through the various ways in which the term or identity "Jew" has been defined. One by one he proves to his own satisfaction why each is fatally flawed. Then he borrows from his existentialist and phenomenological philosophy to define a Jew as a person that others look at and say, "look, he/she is a Jew". Just as a chair is a chair by virtue of our considering it a chair, so is a Jew a person whom others consider to be a Jew. Therefore, a Jew's Jewishness exists only to the extent they are considered Jewish by those around them.

== Critical response ==
David Nirenberg faults Sartre for his inability to "let go of the conviction that in a more perfect world the particularities of Judaism would vanish into one universal French identity—and this at a time when, in the not-yet-liberated East, Jews were still being liquidated in the name of a competing program for the improvement of society".

== See also ==
- Max Nordau: Failure of emancipation
