= Colonialism and Neocolonialism =

1964 book by Jean-Paul Sartre

- Author: Jean-Paul Sartre
- Language: French
- Publication date: 1964

Colonialism and Neocolonialism by Jean-Paul Sartre (first published in French in 1964) is a controversial and influential critique of French policies in Algeria. It argues for French disengagement from its former Overseas Empire and controversially defending the rights of violent resistance by groups such as the Algerian FLN in order to achieve this.

Its text includes Sartre's preface to Frantz Fanon's Wretched of the Earth. The book influenced later writings by Albert Memmi, and Jean-François Lyotard.

== Synopsis ==
Sartre argues that colonialism and neocolonialism are oppressive systems that exploit colonized people and extract resources from their lands. Colonialism creates a power dynamic where the colonizer holds all the power and the colonized are reduced to objects of exploitation. Neocolonialism maintains the same oppressive system but operates under the guise of economic and cultural dominance. Sartre also critiques the role of intellectuals in justifying and perpetuating the oppressive system. He believes that intellectuals have the potential to challenge this system by aligning themselves with the oppressed and embracing their role as critics. Overall, Sartre calls for a reevaluation of the dominant ideology and a reclamation of agency by colonized people.
