= Sketch for a Theory of the Emotions =

1939 book by Jean-Paul Sartre

- Author: Jean-Paul Sartre
- Original title: Esquisse d'une théorie des émotions
- Language: French
- Subject: Emotion
- Published: 1939
- Publication place: France
- Media type: Print

Sketch for a Theory of the Emotions (French: Esquisse d'une théorie des émotions) is a 1939 book by the philosopher Jean-Paul Sartre. This work contains some of his thoughts about human and emotions. Some of his ideas later appeared in his masterpiece Being and Nothingness.

== Summary ==
Sartre analyses existing theories of emotion, including psychological and psychoanalytic accounts, before presenting his own phenomenological account. In Sartre's view, emotion is not simply a passive inner state or a bodily reaction, but a way consciousness actively responds to a difficult situation. The Internet Encyclopedia of Philosophy describes this as Sartre replacing "the traditional picture of the passivity of our emotional nature" with a view of the subject's active participation in emotional experience.

The book argues that emotion can function as a "magical" transformation of the world: when ordinary action appears blocked, consciousness changes the way the situation is apprehended. The Routledge Encyclopedia of Philosophy summarizes Sartre's position as the claim that emotions are "chosen rather than caused" and involve an attempt to transform reality by changing one's own feelings rather than the external situation. The work is generally treated as part of Sartre's early phenomenological psychology and as anticipating themes later developed in Being and Nothingness.

== Editions ==
- The Emotions: Outline of a Theory, translated by Bernard Frechtman, The Philosophical Library, 1948.
