= What Is Metaphysics? =

1929 lecture by Martin Heidegger

"What Is Metaphysics?" (German: Was ist Metaphysik?) is a lecture by the philosopher Martin Heidegger, first presented to the faculties of the University of Freiburg on July 24, 1929, as inaugural address.

== English translations ==
- R.F.C. Hull and Alan Crick in 1949, in Existence and Being, edited by Werner Brock (Chicago: Henry Regnery), pp. 325–349
- David Krell, in Basic Writings (1977) New York: Harper and Row (expanded edition, 1993), pp. 93–110
- Miles Groth, "What Is Metaphysics?"

== See also ==
- Metaphilosophy
