= What Is Literature? =

1948 book by Jean-Paul Sartre

- Cover of the first edition
- Author: Jean-Paul Sartre
- Original title: Qu'est-ce que la littérature?
- Translator: Bernard Frechtman
- Language: French
- Subject: Literature, philosophy
- Publisher: Methuen & Co. Ltd (London)
- Publication date: 1948
- Publication place: France
- English publication date: 1950
- Media type: Print
- Pages: 238

What Is Literature? (French: Qu'est-ce que la littérature?), also published as Literature and Existentialism, is an essay by French philosopher and novelist Jean-Paul Sartre, published by Gallimard in 1948. Initially published in freestanding essays across French literary journals Les Temps modernes, Situations I and Situations II, essays "What Is Writing?" and "Why Write?" were translated into English and published by the Paris-based literary journal Transition 1948. The English translation by Bernard Frechtman was published in 1950.

== Summary ==
Sartre attempts to devise an understanding of the effect literature has on those who are subjected to it. In the foreword Sartre addresses his critics who condemn him for supposing literature can be political rather than relegated to purely art. Using the term "committed writing" in relation to the writer who is politically active, Sartre begins his query into the art of writing. The book is divided into four chapters:

1. What is Writing?
2. Why Write?
3. For Whom Does One Write?
4. Situation of the Writer in 1947

Sartre makes a significant distinction between prose and poetry; arguing that prose is committed writing, and that only poetry fits into his critics' conception of literature as an object (such as a painting or a sculpture). Sartre maintains that the prose writer utilizes language with deliberation, and in keeping with his early existentialist philosophy that man is ultimately free, Sartre argues that committed writing communicates the ideal of a free society.

== What is writing? ==
Sartre distinguishes the art of writing prose from other forms of art such as poetry, painting, or a musical composition. In the latter group, the viewer subjects the piece of art to the viewer's own interpretation, and the work becomes an object. Meanwhile, prose remains attached to the social, political and historical contexts of the writer, and prose becomes a signifier rather than an object.

Sartre describes the poet as "outside of language." The poet refuses to utilize language, and instead manipulates and disassociates words from the structure of language in an expression to change his internal economy of the world.

Contrarily, prose is utilitarian. The speaker interpolates, persuades, insinuates a particular aim. The prose writer recognizes the loaded nature of words, and deliberately works within the framework of language with resolute will. Sartre rails against aesthetic purism, saying that style determines the value of prose, but beauty is not its main intent. Sartre proclaims, "our great writers wanted to destroy, to edify, to demonstrate." Sartre stresses that the underlying purpose of prose is to communicate meaning, despite the fallibility of its cause over time, because great prose is directly linked to the writer's external economy. Sartre considers it a mistake to divorce literature from the author, and accuses his critics of only appreciating literature after its authors are dead; thus supposedly removed from history, their work can be consumed without being considered "committed", or inherently political or philosophical.

== Why write? ==
Sartre believes that prose communicates ideas, and is an appeal by the individual to feel essential from the world. The prose writer reveals or discloses his experience of the world to others. This contrasts with the poet, who performs acts of perceiving rather than disclosing. The art of writing is deeply linked to freedom and thus ventures into the fields of politics and democracy. The poet frees himself by disassociation, and the prose writer fulfills a duty to utilize language for the end of a conceived free society.
