= Nausea (novel) =

1938 novel by Jean-Paul Sartre

- La Nausée by Jean-Paul Sartre
- Author: Jean-Paul Sartre
- Original title: La Nausée
- Translator: Lloyd Alexander; Robert Baldick
- Language: French
- Genre: Philosophical novel
- Published: 1938 (Éditions Gallimard, in French); 1949 (in English)
- Publication place: France
- Media type: Print (paperback)
- Pages: 248 (Gallimard), 253 (Penguin)
- ISBN: 978-0-141-19484-4 (Penguin UK edition)
- OCLC: 8028693

Nausea (French: La Nausée) is a philosophical novel by the existentialist philosopher Jean-Paul Sartre, published in 1938. It is Sartre's first novel.

The novel takes place in 'Bouville' (homophone of Boue-ville, literally, 'Mud town') a town similar to Le Havre. It comprises the thoughts and subjective experiences—in a personal diary format—of Antoine Roquentin, a melancholic and socially isolated intellectual who is residing in Bouville ostensibly for the purpose of completing a biography on a historical figure. Roquentin's growing alienation and disillusionment coincide with an increasingly intense experience of revulsion, which he calls "the Nausea", in which the people and things around him seem to lose all their familiar and recognizable qualities. Sartre's original title for the novel before publication was Melancholia.

The novel has been translated into English by Lloyd Alexander as The Diary of Antoine Roquentin and by Robert Baldick as Nausea.

== Characters ==
- Antoine Roquentin – The protagonist of the novel, Antoine is a former adventurer who has been living alone in Bouville for three years. He has no friends and is out of touch with family, and often resigns himself to eavesdropping on other people's conversations and examining their actions from a distance. He settles in the seaport town of Bouville to finish his research on the life of an 18th-century political figure, the Marquis de Rollebon. During the winter of 1932 a "sweetish sickness," which he calls "the nausea", increasingly impinges on almost everything he does or enjoys. He tries to find solace in the presence of others, but exhibits signs of boredom and lack of interest when interacting with them. Because of his aloofness to the world and the people around him, he starts to doubt his own existence.
- Anny – An English woman who was once Antoine's lover. After Antoine arranges to meet with her hoping it will ameliorate his condition, Anny makes clear to him she has changed considerably and must get on with her life.
- Ogier P. – Generally referred to as "the self-taught man" or the Autodidact, he is a bailiff's clerk and an acquaintance of Antoine's. Ogier lives for the pursuit of knowledge and love of humanity, which inspires in Antoine much criticism and mockery, although he develops a strange compassion for him. Highly disciplined, he has spent hundreds of hours reading at the local library. He often speaks to Antoine and confides to him that he is a socialist.

== Literary genre and style ==
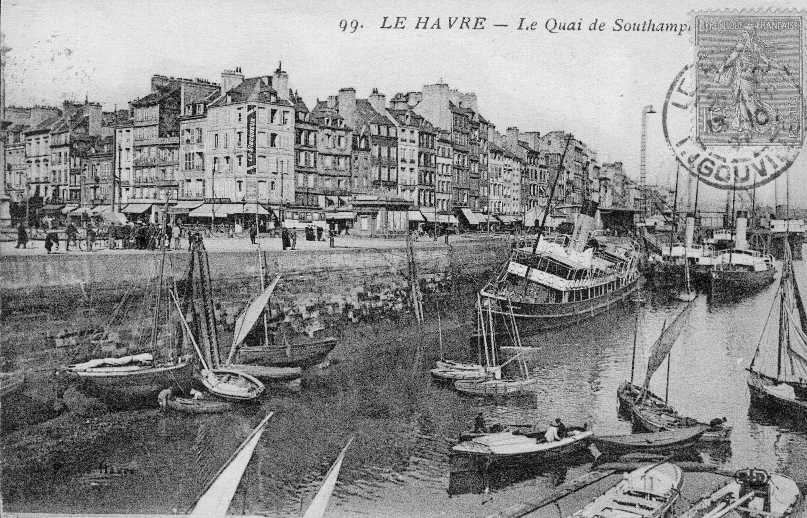
Le Havre: Quai de Southampton in the 1920s

Like many Modernist novels, La Nausée is a "city-novel", encapsulating experience within the city. It is widely assumed that Bouville in the novel is a fictional portrayal of Le Havre, where Sartre was living and teaching in the 1930s as he wrote it.

The critic William V. Spanos has used Sartre's novel as an example of "negative capability", a presentation of the uncertainty and dread of human existence so strong that the imagination cannot comprehend it.

The Cambridge Companion to the French Novel places La Nausée in a tradition of French activism: "Following on from Malraux, Sartre, Beauvoir, and Camus among others were all able to use the writing of novels as a powerful tool of ideological exploration." Although novelists like Sartre claim to be in rebellion against the 19th Century French novel, "they in fact owe a great deal both to its promotion of the lowly and to its ambiguous or 'poetic' aspects."

In his essay What Is Literature?, Sartre wrote, "On the one hand, the literary object has no substance but the reader's subjectivity ... But, on the other hand, the words are there like traps to arouse our feelings and to reflect them towards us ... Thus, the writer appeals to the reader's freedom to collaborate in the production of the work."

The novel, according to Sartre, is an intricate formal achievement modeled on much 18th-century fiction that was presented as a "diary discovered among the papers of...".

Hayden Carruth wonders if there are unrecognized layers of irony and humor beneath the seriousness of Nausea: "Sartre, for all his anguished disgust, can play the clown as well, and has done so often enough: a sort of fool at the metaphysical court."

Like many modernist authors, Sartre, when young, loved popular novels in preference to the classics and claimed in his autobiography that it was from them, rather than from the balanced phrases of Chateaubriand, that he had his "first encounters with beauty".

Sartre described the stream of consciousness technique as one method of moving the novel from the era of Newtonian physics forward into the era of Einstein's theory of general relativity, in terms of writing style. He saw this as crucial because he felt that "narrative technique ultimately takes us back to the metaphysics of the novelist." He wanted his novelistic techniques to be compatible with his theories on the existential freedom of the individual as well as his phenomenological analyses of the unstable, shifting structures of consciousness.

== As a psychological novel ==
Disdaining 19th-century notions that character development in novels should obey and reveal psychological law, La Nausée treats such notions as bourgeois bad faith, ignoring the contingency and inexplicability of life.

From the psychological point of view, Antoine Roquentin could be seen as an individual suffering from depression, and the Nausea itself as one of the symptoms of his condition. Unemployed, living in deprived conditions, lacking human contact, being trapped in fantasies about the 18th-century secret agent he is writing a book about, he establishes Sartre's oeuvre as a follow-up to Dostoevsky's Crime and Punishment, or Rilke's The Notebooks of Malte Laurids Brigge in search of a precise description of schizophrenia. Rilke's character anticipates Sartre's.

However, Roquentin's predicament is not simply depression or mental illness, although his experience has pushed him to that point. Sartre presents Roquentin's difficulties as arising from man's inherent existential condition. His seemingly special situation (returning from travel, reclusiveness), which goes beyond the mere indication of his very real depression, is supposed to induce in him (and in the reader) a state that makes one more receptive to noticing an existential situation that everyone experiences, but may not be sensitive enough to let become consciously noticeable. Roquentin undergoes a strange metaphysical experience that estranges him from the world. His problems are not merely a result of personal insanity, which would be deprived of larger significance. Rather, like the characters in the Dostoevsky and Rilke novels, he is a victim of larger ideological, social, and existential forces that have brought him to the brink of insanity. Sartre's point in Nausea is to comment on our universal reaction to these common external predicaments.

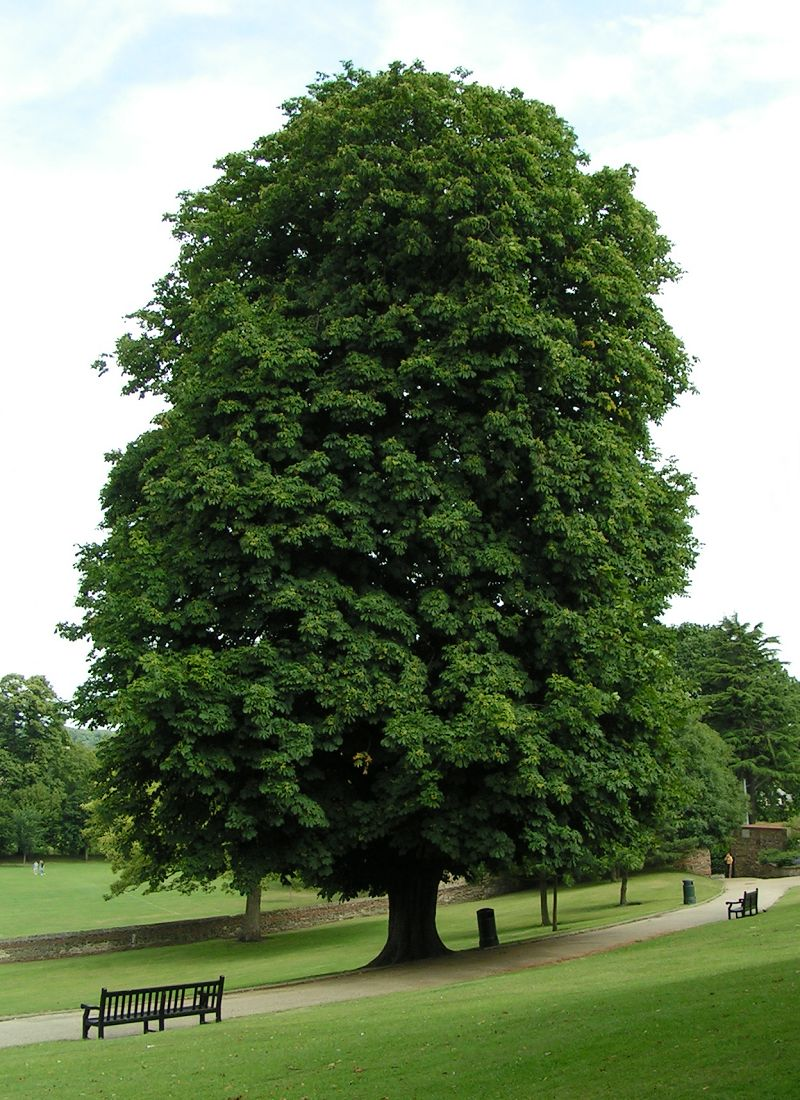
Horse chestnut tree

Hayden Carruth wrote of the way that "Roquentin has become a familiar of our world, one of those men who, like Hamlet or Julien Sorel, live outside the pages of the books in which they assumed their characters ... It is scarcely possible to read seriously in contemporary literature, philosophy, or psychology without encountering references to Roquentin's confrontation with the chestnut tree, for example, which is one of the sharpest pictures ever drawn of self-doubt and metaphysical anguish. ... Certainly, Nausea gives us a few of the clearest and hence most useful images of man in our time that we possess; and this, as Allen Tate has said, is the supreme function of art."

More recently, younger French academics following Emmanuel Legeard have rather built upon cultural psychology to interpret the nausea feeling more metaphorically: "The feeling of nausea has spawned a series of implausible interpretations, but any truly involved reader should be able to apprehend through intuitive sympathy that nausea is disgust at the traumatic decomposition of the divine within existence, symptomatic of the discovery of the absurd, of the disenchantment of the world. Transcendence and providence were invented by man. Every being is meaningless "in itself". There is no God. But the experience through nausea ends up taking a positive turn: if God doesn't exist, then everything becomes possible. And that's how, with despair, true optimism begins."

== As a work of philosophy ==
Criticism of Sartre's novels frequently centered on the tension between the philosophical and political on one side, and the novelistic and individual on the other.

Ronald Aronson describes the reaction of Albert Camus, still in Algeria and working on his own first novel, L’Étranger. At the time of the novel's release, Camus was a reviewer for an Algiers left-wing daily. Camus told a friend that he "thought a lot about the book" and it was "a very close part of [himself]." In his review, Camus wrote, "the play of the toughest and most lucid mind are at the same time both lavished and squandered." Camus felt that each of the book's chapters, taken by itself, "reaches a kind of perfection in bitterness and truth." However, he also felt that the descriptive and the philosophical aspects of the novel are not balanced, that they "don't add up to a work of art: the passage from one to the other is too rapid, too unmotivated, to evoke in the reader the deep conviction that makes the art of the novel." He likewise felt that Sartre had tipped the balance too far in depicting the repugnant features of mankind "instead of placing the reasons for his despair, at least to a certain degree, if not completely, on the elements of human greatness." Still, Camus's largely positive review led to a friendship between the two authors.

Philosopher G. J. Mattey describes Nausea and others of Sartre's literary works as "practically philosophical treatises in literary form."

In his book Irrational Man, the philosopher William Barrett, in distinction both from Camus's feeling that Nausea is an uneasy marriage of novel and philosophy and also from Mattey's belief that it is a philosophy text, expresses an opposite judgment. He writes that Nausea "may well be Sartre's best book for the very reason that in it the intellectual and the creative artist come closest to being conjoined." Barrett says that, in other literary works and in his literary criticism, Sartre feels the pull of ideas too strongly to respond to poetry, "which is precisely that form of human expression in which the poet—and the reader who would enter the poet's world—must let Being be, to use Heidegger's phrase, and not attempt to coerce it by the will to action or the will to intellectualization."

The poet Hayden Carruth agrees with Barrett, whom he quotes, about Nausea. He writes firmly that Sartre, "is not content, like some philosophers, to write fable, allegory, or a philosophical tale in the manner of Candide; he is content only with a proper work of art that is at the same time a synthesis of philosophical specifications."

Barrett feels that Sartre as a writer is best when "the idea itself is able to generate artistic passion and life."

The core philosophical issue of the novel is the realization that reality is fundamentally "contingent" – that it is utterly groundless – a view Sartre took from Nietzsche. For Sartre, this realization is not intellectual comprehension of an abstract idea, but rather a lived experience of reality itself. Thus, instead of arguing abstractly for contingency, Nausea is a literary invitation to share the experience of contingency. From its earliest beginnings, Simone de Beauvoir recognised Nausea as the first robust expression of this key philosophical idea:

I came to realize the wealth of meaning in what he called his 'theory of contingency,' and in which were to be found already the seeds of all his ideas on being, existence, necessity, and liberty... But he wasn't making things easy for himself, for he had no intention of composing a theoretical treatise on conventional lines. He ... refused to separate philosophy from literature. In his view, Contingency was no abstract notion, but an actual dimension of real life: it would be necessary to make use of all the resources of art to make the human heart aware of that secret 'failing' which he perceived in Man and in the world around him."

As the project developed, Sartre intended to follow Husserl's phenomenological maxim, "to the things themselves," and lead his audience as directly as possible to the experience of reality itself, which required the art of literature rather than the abstract prose of academic philosophy.

== As a novel of personal commitment ==
Steven Ungar compares Nausea with French novels of different periods, such as Madame de La Fayette's La Princesse de Clèves (1678), Honoré de Balzac's Le Père Goriot (1835), André Malraux's La Condition humaine (1933), and Annie Ernaux's Une femme (1988), all of which have scenes with men and women faced with choices and "provide literary expressions to concerns with personal identity that vary over time more in detail than in essence."

Cover: 1964, 7th printing of Nausea; New Directions.

A main theme in La Nausée is that life is meaningless unless a person makes personal commitments that give it meaning. William Barrett emphasizes that the despair and disgust in Nausea contrast with the total despair of Céline (who is quoted on the flyleaf of the French edition) that leads to nothing; rather, they are a necessary personal recognition that eventuate in "a release from disgust into heroism."

Barrett adds that, "like Adler's, Sartre's is fundamentally a masculine psychology; it misunderstands and disparages the psychology of woman. The humanity of man consists in the For-itself, the masculine component by which we choose, make projects, and generally commit ourselves to a life of action. The element of masculine protest, to use Adler's term, is strong throughout Sartre's writings ... the disgust ... of Roquentin, in Nausea, at the bloated roots of the chestnut tree ...".

Mattey elaborates further on the positive, redeeming aspect of the seemingly bleak, frustrating themes of existentialism that are so apparent in Nausea: "Sartre considered the subjectivity of the starting-point for what a human is as a key thesis of existentialism. The starting-point is subjective because humans make themselves what they are. Most philosophers consider subjectivity to be a bad thing, particularly when it comes to the motivation for action... . Sartre responds by claiming that subjectivity is a dignity of human being, not something that degrades us." Therefore, the characteristic anguish and forlornness of existentialism are temporary: only a prerequisite to recognizing individual responsibility and freedom. The basis of ethics is not rule-following. A specific action may be either wrong or right and no specific rule is necessarily valid. What makes the action, either way, ethical is "authenticity," the willingness of the individual to accept responsibility rather than dependence on rules, and to commit to his action. Despair, the existentialist says, is the product of uncertainty: being oriented exclusively to the outcome of a decision rather than to the process yields uncertainty, as we cannot decide the future, only our action.

In his "Introduction" to the American edition of Nausea, the poet and critic Hayden Carruth feels that, even outside those modern writers who are explicitly philosophers in the existentialist tradition, a similar vein of thought is implicit but prominent in a main line through Franz Kafka, Miguel de Unamuno, D. H. Lawrence, André Malraux, and William Faulkner. Carruth says:

'Suffering is the origin of consciousness,' Dostoevsky wrote. But suffering is everywhere in the presence of thought and sensitivity. Sartre for his part has written, and with equal simplicity: 'Life begins on the other side of despair.'

Sartre declared, in a lecture given in Paris on 29 October 1945 (later published under the title L'existentialisme est un humanisme):

What is meant ... by saying that existence precedes essence? It means that, first of all, man exists, turns up, appears on the scene, and only afterwards defines himself. If man, as the existentialist conceives of him, is undefinable, it is only because he is nothing. Only afterwards will he be something, and he will have made what he will be.

If things—and also people—are contingent, if they "just are," then we are free and we create ourselves solely through our decisions and choices.

David Drake mentions that, in Nausea, Sartre gives several kinds of examples of people whose behavior shows bad faith, who are inauthentic: members of the bourgeoisie who believe their social standing or social skills give them a "right" to exist, or others who embrace the banality of life and attempt to flee from freedom by repeating empty gestures, others who live by perpetuating past versions of themselves as they were or who live for the expectations of others, or those who claim to have found meaning in politics, morality, or ideology.

In simply narrative terms, Roquentin's nausea arises from his near-complete detachment from other people, his not needing much interaction with them for daily necessities: "The fact of his alienation from others is important; as his own work ceases to entertain and to occupy him, Roquentin has nothing that could distract him from the business of existing in its simplest forms." As a practical matter, he could solve his problem by getting a job; but, as a device for developing the novel's theme, his aloneness is a way of making him (and the reader) recognize that there is nothing inherent in the objective nature of the world that would give any necessary meaning to whatever actions he chose, and therefore nothing to restrict his freedom. "[H]is perception of the world around him becomes unstable as objects are disengaged from their usual frames of reference," and he is forced to recognize that freedom is inescapable and that therefore creating a meaning for his life is his own responsibility. "Nothing makes us act the way we do, except our own personal choice."

"But," David Clowney writes, "freedom is frightening, and it is easier to run from it into the safety of roles and realities that are defined by society, or even by your own past. To be free is to be thrown into existence with no "human nature" as an essence to define you, and no definition of the reality into which you are thrown, either. To accept this freedom is to live "authentically"; but most of us run from authenticity. In the most ordinary affairs of daily life, we face the challenge of authentic choice, and the temptation of comfortable inauthenticity. All of Roquentin's experiences are related to these themes from Sartre's philosophy."

Genius is what a man invents when he is looking for a way out.

— Jean-Paul Sartre

== As a novel of political commitment ==
During the Second World War, the experience of Sartre and others in the French Resistance to the Nazi occupation of France emphasized political activism as a form of personal commitment. This political dimension was developed in Sartre's later trilogy of novels, Les Chemins de la Liberté (The Roads to Freedom) (1945–1949), which concern a vicious circle of failure on the part of a thinking individual to progress effectively from thought to action. Finally, for Sartre, political commitment became explicitly Marxist.

In 1945, Sartre gave a lecture in New York that was printed in Vogue in July of that year. In it he recast his prewar works, such as Nausea, into politically committed works appropriate to the postwar era.

Marxism was not, in any case, always as appreciative of Sartre as he was of it. Mattey describes their objections:

Marxism was a very potent political and philosophical force in France after its liberation from the Nazi occupation. Marxist thinkers tend to be very ideological and to condemn in no uncertain terms what they regard to be rival positions. They found existentialism to run counter to their emphasis on the solidarity of human beings and their theory of material (economic) determinism. The subjectivity that is the starting point of existentialism seemed to the Marxists to be foreign to the objective character of economic conditions and to the goal of uniting the working classes in order to overthrow the bourgeoise capitalists. If one begins with the reality of the "I think," one loses sight of what really defines the human being (according to the Marxists), which is their place in the economic system. Existentialism's emphasis on individual choice leads to contemplation, rather than to action. Only the bourgeoise have the luxury to make themselves what they are through their choices, so existentialism is a bourgeoise philosophy.

== Sartre's philosophy ==
=== From Husserl to Heidegger ===
Sartre was influenced at the time by the philosophy of Edmund Husserl and his phenomenological method. He received a stipend from the Institut Français, allowing him to study in Berlin with Husserl and Martin Heidegger in 1932, as he began writing the novel.

Roy Elveton reports:

In January, 1939, one year after the death of Edmund Husserl, Sartre published a short essay entitled 'Husserl's Central Idea.' In the space of a few paragraphs, Sartre rejects the epistemology of Descartes and the neo-Kantians and their view of consciousness's relationship to the world. Consciousness is not related to the world by virtue of a set of mental representations and acts of mental synthesis that combine such representations to provide us with our knowledge of the external world. Husserl's intentional theory of consciousness provides the only acceptable alternative: 'Consciousness and the world are immediately given together: the world, essentially external to consciousness, is essentially related to it.' The only appropriate image for intentionality and our knowing relationship to the world is that of an 'explosion': 'to know is to "explode" toward' an object in the world, an object 'beyond oneself, over there ... towards that which is not oneself ... out of oneself.'

Following Husserl, Sartre views absurdity as a quality of all existing objects (and of the material world collectively), independent of any stance humans might take with respect to them. Our consciousness of an object does not inhere in the object itself. Thus in the early portions of the novel, Roquentin, who takes no attitude towards objects and has no stake in them, is totally estranged from the world he experiences. The objects themselves, in their brute existence, have only participation in a meaningless flow of events: they are superfluous. This alienation from objects casts doubt for him, in turn, on his own validity and even his own existence.

Roquentin says of physical objects that, for them, "to exist is simply to be there." When he has the revelation at the chestnut tree, this "fundamental absurdity" of the world does not go away. What changes then is his attitude. By recognizing that objects won't supply meaning in themselves, but people must supply it for them – that Roquentin himself must create meaning in his own life – he becomes both responsible and free. The absurdity becomes, for him, "the key to existence."

Victoria Best writes:

Language proves to be a fragile barrier between Roquentin and the external world, failing to refer to objects and thus place them in a scheme of meaning. Once language collapses it becomes evident that words also give a measure of control and superiority to the speaker by keeping the world at bay; when they fail in this function, Roquentin is instantly vulnerable, unprotected.

Thus, although, in some senses, Sartre's philosophy in Nausea derives from Husserl and ultimately from René Descartes, the strong role he gives to the contingent randomness of physical objects contrasts with their commitment to the role of necessity. (Roy Elveton mentions that, unknown to Sartre, Husserl himself was developing the same ideas, but in manuscripts that remained unpublished.)

Ethan Kleinberg writes that, more than Husserl, it was Martin Heidegger who appealed to Sartre's sense of radical individualism. He says, "for Sartre, the question of being was always and only a question of personal being. The dilemma of the individual confronting the overwhelming problem of understanding the relationship of consciousness to things, of being to things, is the central focus" of Nausea. Eventually, "in his reworking of Husserl, Sartre found himself coming back to the themes he had absorbed from Heidegger's Was ist Metaphysik?" Nausea was a prelude to Sartre's sustained attempt to follow Heidegger's Sein und Zeit by analyzing human experience as various ontological modes, or ways of being in the world.

In 1937, just as Sartre was finishing Nausea and getting it to press, he wrote an essay, The Transcendence of the Ego. He still agreed with Husserl that consciousness is "about" objects or, as they say, it "intends" them – rather than forming within itself a duplicate, an inner representation of an outward object. The material objects of consciousness (or "objects of intention") exist in their own right, independent and without any residue accumulating in them from our awareness of them. However, the new idea in this essay was that Sartre now differed in also believing that the person's ego itself is also "in the world," an object of consciousness to be discovered, rather than the totally known subject of consciousness. In the novel, not only Roquentin's consciousness but his own body also become objectified in his new, alarming perception.

And so Sartre parted company with Husserl over the latter's belief in a transcendent ego, which Sartre believed instead was neither formally nor materially in consciousness, but outside it: in the world.

This seemingly technical change fit with Sartre's native predisposition to think of subjectivity as central: a conscious person is always immersed in a world where his or her task is to make himself concrete. A "person" is not an unchanging, central essence, but a fluid construct that continually re-arises as an interaction among a person's consciousness, his physiology and history, the material world, and other people. This view itself supported Sartre's vision of people as fundamentally both doomed and free to live lives of commitment and creativity.

As Søren Kierkegaard, the earliest existentialist, wrote: 'I must find a truth that is true for me ... the idea for which I can live or die.'

— Problems of absurd life

=== Compared to other philosophies ===
La Nausée allows Sartre to explain his philosophy in simplified terms. Roquentin is the classic existentialist hero whose attempts to pierce the veil of perception lead him to a strange combination of disgust and wonder. For the first part of the novel, Roquentin has flashes of Nausea that emanate from mundane objects. These flashes appear seemingly randomly, from staring at a crumpled piece of paper in the gutter to picking up a rock on the beach. The feeling he perceives is pure disgust: a contempt so refined that it almost shatters his mind each time it occurs. As the novel progresses, the Nausea appears more and more frequently, though he is still unsure of what it actually signifies. However, at the base of a horse chestnut tree in a park, he receives a piercingly clear vision of what the Nausea actually is. Existence itself, the property of existence to be something rather than nothing was what was slowly driving him mad. He no longer sees objects as having qualities such as color or shape. Instead, all words are separated from the thing itself, and he is confronted with pure being.

Carruth points out that the antipathy of the existentialists to formal ethical rules brought them disapproval from moral philosophers concerned with traditional schemes of value. On the other hand, analytical philosophers and logical positivists were "outraged by Existentialism's willingness to abandon rational categories and rely on nonmental processes of consciousness."

Additionally, Sartre's philosophy of existentialism is opposed to a certain kind of rationalistic humanism. Upon the confession of the Self-Taught Man as to being a member of the S.F.I.O., a French Socialist party, Roquentin quickly engages him in a Socratic dialogue to expose his inconsistencies as a humanist. Roquentin first points out how his version of humanism remains unaffiliated to a particular party or group so as to include or value all of mankind. However, he then notes how the humanist nonetheless caters his sympathy with a bias towards the humble portion of mankind. Roquentin continues to point out further discrepancies of how one humanist may favor an audience of laughter while another may enjoy the somber funeral. In dialogue, Roquentin challenges the Self-Taught Man to show a demonstrable love for a particular, tangible person rather than a love for the abstract entity attached to that person (e.g. the idea of Youth in a young man). In short, he concludes that such humanism naively attempts to "melt all human attitudes into one." More importantly, to disavow humanism does not constitute "anti-humanism".

The kind of humanism Sartre found unacceptable, according to Mattey, "is one that denies the primacy of individual choice... . But there is another conception of humanism implicit in existentialism. This is one that emphasizes the ability of individual human beings to transcend their individual circumstances and act on behalf of all humans. The fact is, Sartre maintains, that the only universe we have is a human universe, and the only laws of this universe are made by humans."

== Early reception ==
In his Sartre biography, David Drake writes, "Nausea was on the whole well received by the critics and the success of Sartre the novelist served to enhance the reputation he had started to enjoy as a writer of short stories and philosophical texts, mostly on perception."

Although his earlier essays did not receive much attention, Nausea and the collection of stories The Wall, swiftly brought him recognition.

Carruth writes that, on publication, "it was condemned, predictably, in academic circles, but younger readers welcomed it, and it was far more successful than most first novels."

== Publication history ==
=== Writing and editing ===
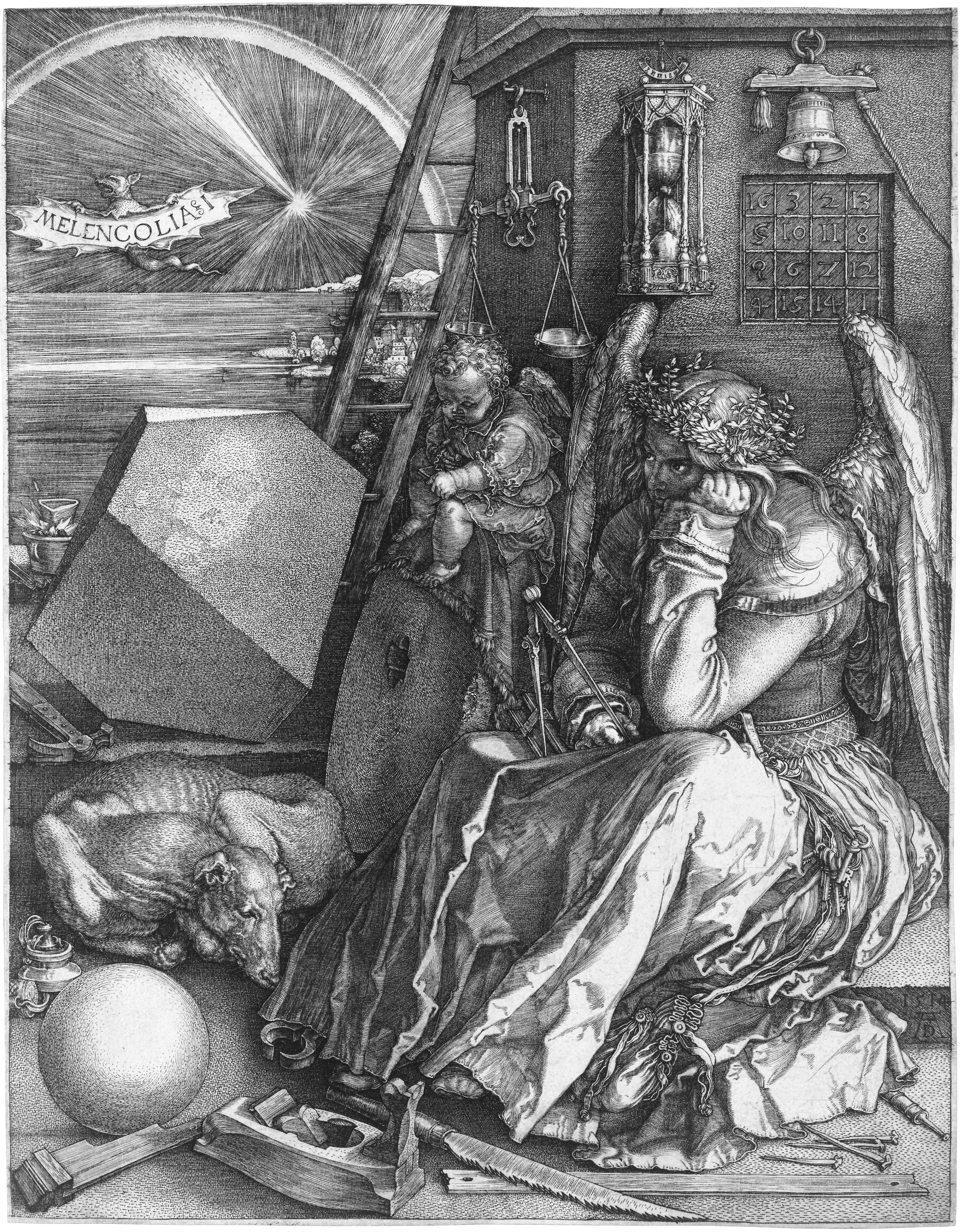
Melencolia I, by Albrecht Dürer

Sartre originally titled the novel Melancholia, based on the engraving Melencolia I by Albrecht Dürer. Simone de Beauvoir referred to it as his "factum on contingency." He composed it from 1932 to 1936. He had begun it during his military service and continued writing at Le Havre and in Berlin.

Ethan Kleinberg reports:

Sartre went to study in Berlin for the academic year 1933. While in Berlin, Sartre did not take any university courses or work with Husserl or Heidegger. Sartre's time seems to have been spent reading Husserl and working on the second draft of Nausea.

David Drake confirms this account.

The manuscript was subsequently typed. It was at first refused by the Nouvelle Revue Française (N.R.F.), despite a strong recommendation from their reviewer, Jean Paulhan. In 1937, however, the imprint's publisher, Gaston Gallimard, accepted it and suggested the title La Nausée.

Brice Parain, the editor, asked for numerous cuts of material that was either too populist or else too sexual to avoid an action for indecency. Sartre deleted the populist material, which was not natural to him, with few complaints, because he wanted to be published by the prestigious N.R.F., which had a strong, if vague, house style. However, he stood fast on the sexual material which he felt was an artistically necessary hallucinatory ingredient.

Michel Contat, one of Sartre's closest collaborators and then among his most prominent scholars, has examined the original typescript and feels that, "if ever Melancholia is published as its author had originally intended it, the novel will no doubt emerge as a work which is more composite, more baroque and perhaps more original than the version actually published."

=== Translations ===
The North-American publisher New Directions first issued Lloyd Alexander's translation in 1949 as part of its New Classics library; a New Directions paperback edition was introduced in 1959.

Retranslated into English by Robert Baldick, published in the UK by Penguin Books in 1965 and reissued in 2000 with an introduction by James Wood.

Translated into Sinhala language as ජුගුප්සාව by Ranjan Premathilaka Hapuarachchi in 1994 and published by the State Printing Corporation, Sri Lanka.

Translated into Arabic by the late Lebanese novelist Suhayl Idris.

== See also ==
- French literature of the 20th century
- Existentialism
