= Artus =

Artus or Arthus is a Breton surname and given name which means "bear" (cf. arth), and may refer to:

- Amédée Artus (1815–1892), French conductor and composer of operettas
- Alexandre Artus (1821–1911), French conductor and composer of classical music
- Dominique Artus (born 1962), French journalist
- Patrick Artus (born 1951), French economist
- Artus (born 1987), French actor, director and comedian
- Artus de Cossé-Brissac (1512–1582), French military man, diplomat, and finance minister
- Artus de Penguern (1957–2013), French director, writer and actor
- Henri Arthus (1872–1962), French skipper
- Nicolas Maurice Arthus (1862–1945), French immunologist and physiologist
- Yann Arthus-Bertrand (born 1946), French photographer, journalist, reporter and environmentalist
- Arthus Barthélémy Vingtrinier (1796–1872), French physician

== See also ==
- Arthus (disambiguation)
- Artus (disambiguation)
