= Ranjan Ghosh (academic) =

Indian academic and professor

- Occupations: Academic; teacher

Academic work
- Institutions: University of North Bengal
- Main interests: comparative literature; comparative philosophy; philosophy of education; environmental humanities; critical and cultural theory; intellectual history
- Website: Official website

Ranjan Ghosh is an Indian academic and thinker who teaches at the Department of English, University of North Bengal, India. His wide-ranging scholarly work spans across the fields of comparative literature, comparative philosophy, philosophy of education, environmental humanities, critical and cultural theory, and Intellectual history. He has been an Alexander von Humboldt Fellow.

== Career ==
Ghosh teaches at the Department of English, University of North Bengal. Prior to that he taught at Darjeeling Government College, West Bengal. He was a university professor at the Institute of English Studies, University of Wrocław, Poland during 2005–06, and a Professorial Fellow at the Institute for Cultural Studies at the University of Duisburg-Essen, Germany in 2006. He was elected an Alexander von Humboldt Fellow by the Alexander von Humboldt Foundation in November 2006.

He delivered a distinguished lecture series on Plastic hosted by Beijing Language and Culture University, Shenzhen University and Lanzhou University (2021), and a mini seminar series, Plastic Turn, at the Critical Theory Institute, University of California (2018). He was a visiting professor at the Department of English and Culture, University of Eastern Piedmont, Vercelli, Italy (2019); visiting professor at the Department of English, Ashoka University (2019); visiting faculty member of the South Asia Program at Cornell University; visiting professor at the Department of English and American Studies, University of Würzburg, Germany and guest professor at the Siebold Institute of Advanced Studies (2017).

== Works ==
His wide-ranging scholarly work engages with many fields of comparative literature, comparative philosophy, philosophy of education, environmental humanities, critical and cultural theory and intellectual history. His significant work in these areas include: the critically acclaimed Thinking Literature across Continents (2016) that he co-authored with American literary critic J. Hillis Miller, issued by Duke University Press. The book has been cited in numerous essays, journal forums, and reviews. In particular two special numbers on the book were published by CounterText. Subsequently Penn State University's Interdisciplinary Literary Studies also issued a special number of their work, as did Symploke (University of Nebraska Press), College Literature (Johns Hopkins University Press), and Literary Imagination (Oxford University Press).

His works have been published in journals including Critical Inquiry, Diacritics, SubStance, Oxford Literary Review, The Comparatist, Comparative Education Review, Symploke, Canadian Review of Comparative Literature, The Minnesota Review, History and Theory, Modern Language Notes, College Literature, Comparative Literature Studies, Parallax, University of Toronto Quarterly, Angelaki and others.

Ghosh's thinking on historiography and historical theory comes through in his book A Lover's Quarrel with the Past: Romance, Representation, Reading (2012). His book Thinking Literature Across Continents (2016) examines the function of literature and literariness through the transnational and transcultural basis of critical, scholarly, literary, and artistic voices.

Ghosh's work on education resulted in the exploration of Rabindranath Tagore's ideas of education within the framework of transcultural philosophy of education. His book Aesthetics, Politics, Pedagogy and Tagore: A Transcultural Philosophy of Education (2017) offers "a radical rethinking of Indian thinker Rabindranath Tagore, exploring how his philosophy of education relates to the ideas of Western theorists such as Plato, Aristotle, Kant, Hegel, Heidegger, Martin Buber, Derrida, Deleuze, and others". Ghosh has also introduced new conceptual terms of readings in the critical humanities like 'trans(in)fusion approach' (his recent book is called Trans(in)fusion: Reflections for Critical Thinking from New York, 2020), 'trans-habit' in literary studies (his book Transcultural Poetics and the Concept of the Poet from New York, 2017), and very recently Plastic literature, Plastic Turn and others.

Ghosh is currently the co-editor with Emelia Quinn of the English Association's journal Yearbook on Critical and Cultural Theory published by Oxford University Press.

=== Representative works ===
- Lover's Quarrel with the Past: Romance, Representation, Reading (Oxford, Berghahn Books, 2012)
- Presence: Philosophy, History, and Cultural Theory for the Twenty-First Century ed. (Ithaca, New York, London: Cornell University Press, 2013, with Ethan Kleinberg)
- Thinking Literature Across Continents (with J. Hillis Miller) (Durham, London: Duke University Press, 2016)
- Aesthetics, Politics, Pedagogy and Tagore: A Transcultural Philosophy of Education (London: Palgrave, 2017)
- Transcultural Poetics and the Concept of the Poet: From Philip Sidney to T. S. Eliot (New York: Routledge, 2017)
- Philosophy and Poetry: Continental Perspectives (New York: Columbia University Press, 2019)
- Trans(in)fusion: Reflections for Critical Thinking (New York: Routledge, 2019)
- The Plastic Turn (Ithaca: Cornell University Press, 2022)
- Plastic Controversy. Critical Inquiry, In the Moment. February, 2021.
- Ghosh, Ranjan (Spring 2019). "Plastic Literature". University of Toronto Quarterly. 88 (2): 277–291. doi:10.3138/utq.88.2.13. ISSN 1712-5278. S2CID 241732532.
- Ghosh, Ranjan (July–August 2018). "Introduction to Focus: What Secular?". American Book Review. 39 (5): 3–4. doi:10.1353/abr.2018.0060. ISSN 2153-4578. S2CID 149655135.
- Ghosh, Ranjan (December 2015). "Intra-active Transculturality". MLN. 130 (5): 1198–1220. doi:10.1353/mln.2015.0080. ISSN 1080-6598. S2CID 164050641.
- Ghosh, Ranjan (2015). "Caught in the Cross Traffic: Rabindranath Tagore and the Trials of Child Education". Comparative Education Review. 59 (3). University of Chicago Press: 399–419. doi:10.1086/681905. ISSN 0010-4086. S2CID 142451236.
- Ghosh, Ranjan (2015). "Rabindranath and Rabindranath Tagore: Home, World, History". History and Theory. 54 (4). Wiley: 125–148. doi:10.1111/hith.10782. ISSN 0018-2656.
