= Amédée Artus =

French conductor and composer

- Born: Amedée, Urbain, Louis, Henry, Joseph Artus; 28 October 1815; Perpignan
- Died: 16 March 1892 (aged 76); Ille-sur-Têt
- Occupation: Composer

Amedée Urbain Louis Henry Joseph Artus (28 October 1815 – 26 March 1892) was a 19th-century French conductor and composer, author of more than eight hundred incidental music pieces.

Born in Perpignan, Amédée Arthur was the son of Joseph Pierre Artus (1791–1864) and Marie Angélique Salvo (1793–1864), both also from Perpignan. His father played the viola, and he was the older brother of Alexandre Artus, also a conductor and composer.

== Works ==
- 1842: Paris la nuit, drama in 5 acts and 8 scenes by Charles Dupeuty and Eugène Cormon, at Théâtre de l'Ambigu-Comique (26 June)
- 1843: Un Français en Sibérie, drama in 3 acts by Charles Lafont and Noël Parfait, at Théâtre de l'Ambigu-Comique (27 July).
- 1843: Les Bohémiens de Paris, drama in 5 acts by Adolphe d'Ennery and Eugène Grangé, at Théâtre de l'Ambigu-Comique (27 September)
- 1844: Les Amants de Murcie, drama in 5 acts and 6 scenes by Frédéric Soulié, at Théâtre de l'Ambigu-Comique (9 March)
- 1845: Les Mousquetaires, drama in 5 acts and 12 scenes by Alexandre Dumas and Auguste Maquet, at Théâtre de l'Ambigu (27 October)
- 1846: La Closerie des Genêts, drama in 5 acts and 8 scenes by Frédéric Soulié, at Théâtre de l'Ambigu-Comique (14 October)
- 1847: Le Fils du diable, drama in 5 acts and 12 scenes by Paul Féval and Saint-Yves, at Théâtre de l'Ambigu-Comique (24 August)
- 1848: Le Morne-au-Diable, drama in 5 acts and 7 scenes by Eugène Sue, directed by Saint-Ernest, at Théâtre de l'Ambigu-Comique (5 August).
- 1849: Le Pardon de Bretagne, drama in 5 acts and 7 scenes by Marc Fournier, at Théâtre de l'Ambigu-Comique (13 January)
- 1853: Le Ciel et l'Enfer, féérie mingled with songs and dances, in 5 acts and 20 scenes, by Hippolyte Lucas, Eugène Barré and Victor Hugo, at Théâtre de l'Ambigu-Comique (23 May).
- 1854: Le Juif de Venise, drama in 5 acts and 7 scenes by Ferdinand Dugué, after Shakespeare's The Merchant of Venice, at Théâtre de l'Ambigu-Comique (13 January)
- 1857: Les Chevaliers du brouillard, drama in 5 acts and 10 scenes by Adolphe d'Ennery and Ernest Bourget, at Théâtre de la Porte-Saint-Martin (10 July)
- 1860: Le Juif errant, drama à grand spectacle in 5 acts and 17 scenes, with prologue and epilogue by Arthur Dinaux and Adolphe d'Ennery, after Eugène Sue's novel, at Théâtre de l'Ambigu-Comique (15 June).
- 1866: La Bergère d'Ivry, drama in 5 acts by Eugène Grangé and Lambert-Thiboust, at Théâtre de l'Ambigu-Comique (30 June).
- 1868: Le Drame de Faverne, drama in 5 acts and 6 scenes by Théodore Barrière and Léon Beauvallet, at Théâtre de l'Ambigu-Comique (6 February)
- 1881: Les Mille et Une Nuits, féérie in 3 acts and 31 scenes by Adolphe d'Ennery and Paul Ferrier, at Théâtre du Châtelet (14 December)
