= The Autodidact =

Fictional character in Nausea

- Nausea character
- First appearance: Nausea (1938)
- Created by: Jean-Paul Sartre

In-universe information
- Occupation: Autodidact, reader of books

The Autodidact is a fictional character from Jean-Paul Sartre's 1938 novel Nausea. The Autodidact, who lives in Bouville near the protagonist Antoine Roquentin, passes his time by reading every book in the local library in alphabetical order. Self-instruction is of critical importance to him, and provides the explanation for his odd behaviour and continual self-delusion.

The name Autodidact comes from the noun Autodidactism, which is the act of self-directed learning about a subject or subjects in which one has had little to no formal education.
