= Arthus =

Arthus may refer to:

- Arthus reaction, a type of local type III hypersensitivity reaction
- Arthus-Bertrand, a French maker of medals and decorations
- Tangara arthus or Golden tanager, a species of bird in the family Thraupidae
- Le roi Arthus (King Arthur), a 1903 opera by the French composer Ernest Chausson
- A variation of the name Artus

== See also ==
- Artus (disambiguation)
