= Eugène Woestyn =

Abuffard Eugène Augustin Woestyn (1813, in Romorantin-Lanthenay – 18 April 1861, in Paris) was a 19th-century French playwright, librettist, poet, journalist, chansonnier and writer.

== Biography ==
Woestyn met Victor Hugo at 14 and had him read his poems. He later became a critic and editor for Le Figaro, and by his profession, left a correspondence with authors like Honoré de Balzac from 1840. He also participated with the Journal du dimanche or among others with Le Gaulois, was a chief editor of the Foyer (1843) and wrote many articles, sometimes polemical, which led to a major quarrel with Frédérick Lemaître. In 1857, he also became chief editor of the Blason de l'Industrie française and in 1858 of the Figaro-programme.

His plays were presented on the most important Parisian stages of the 19th century, including the Théâtre de la Porte-Saint-Martin and the Théâtre de l'Ambigu-Comique.

== Works ==
- 1837: Essais poétiques
- 1838: Riens, poésies
- 1839: La voie sacrée ou les étapes de la gloire, five-act military drama, with Ernest Bourget and Hector Crémieux
- 1840: Bonaparte, ode
- 1841: Feuillets d'histoire dédiés au peuple
- Passion de Notre Seigneur Jésus-Christ, tirée des quatre Évangiles et traduite en vers français par Eugène Woestyn, ouvrage destiné à cultiver la mémoire des enfants dans les petits séminaires, les écoles chrétiennes et généralement toutes les maisons d'éducation
- 1847: Aux enfants de Paris. La Républicaine ou le Peuple est roi, cantata sung by Adalbert, lyrics by Eugène Woestyn, music by Amédée Artus
- 1847: Montdidier
- 1852: Le livre du cellier et de la conservation des vins
- 1852: Le livre de la broderie, du crochet et du filet
- 1852: Le livre de la danse
- 1852: Le livre de la dentelle, ou Manuel de la dentelière
- 1852: Le livre de la parfumerie de famille
- 1852: Le livre de la pianiste et du plain-chant
- 1852: Le Livre de l'hygiène domestique
- 1852: Le livre des conserves et confitures
- 1852: Le livre du découpage à table, ou Manuel de l'écuyer tranchant
- 1852: Le livre de la coiffure
- 1852: Le livre de l'art du chant
- 1852: Le Livre des dames poètes depuis les premiers siècles littéraires jusqu'à nos jours
- 1852: Le livre des domestiques
- 1852: Le livre des jeux de salon
- 1852: Le livre des amusements de la veillée
- 1852: La Saint Napoléon au village, patriotic cantata
- 1852: La ferme de Kilmoor, two-act opéra comique, with Alphonse Varney
- 1855: Histoire de la Saint-Napoléon
- 1855: Angleterre et France, with Charles Duggé, odes
- 1856: Guerre d'Orient, les victoires et conquêtes des armées alliées, 2 vol.
- 1856: Le Blason de l'industrie française. Verrerie
- 1857: Les Enfants du peuple, historical dramas
- 1860: Roi des îles, drama in five acts and eight tableaux, with Jan Czyński
- undated: Les Folies Nouvelles, with Eugène Moreau

== Bibliography ==
- Joseph-Marie Quérard, La littérature française contemporaine: 1827-1849, 1857, p. 307 (read online)
- Le Maitron, Dictionnaire Biographique Mouvement Ouvrier (read online)
- T. J. Walsh, Second Empire Opera: The Théâtre Lyrique, Paris 1851-1870, 1981, p. 358
- Stéphane Vachon, 1850, tombeau d'Honoré de Balzac, 2007, p. 648
- Jean-Didier Wagneur, Françoise Cestor, Les Bohèmes, 1840-1870: Ecrivains - Journalistes - Artistes, 2014 (read online)
