= Alexandre Artus =

French conductor and composer

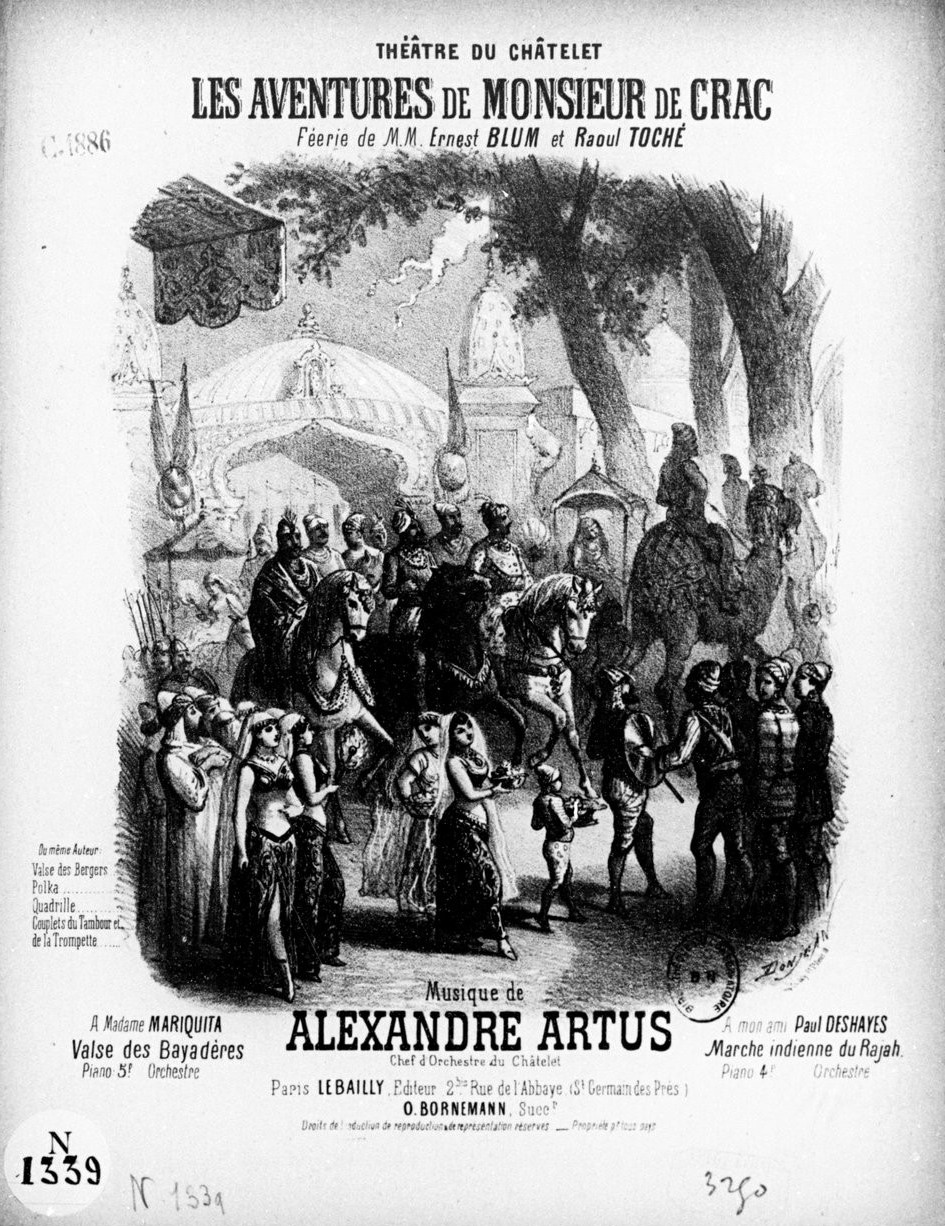
- Couverture de la Marche indienne du Rajah illustrée par Gustave Donjean
- Born: Jean-Jacques-François-Pierre-Alexandre Artus; 27 November 1821; Perpignan
- Died: 19 August 1911 (aged 89); Saint-Maur-des-Fossés
- Occupation(s): Composer; Conductor

Alexandre Artus (27 November 1821 – 19 August 1911) was a 19th-century French conductor and composer.

== Biography ==
Alexandre Artus was born in Perpignan, the son of Joseph Pierre Artus (1791–1864) and Marie Angélique Salvo (1793–1864), both also from Perpignan. His father played the viola, and he was the younger brother of Amédée Artus, also a composer and conductor.

Incidental music and operettas coçmposer, he was the deputy chief and the conductor of the Théâtre de l'Ambigu, which he left in 1863 by disagreements with the director and then became director of the Théâtre du Châtelet from 1885 to his death. He is known to have composed the music for the play by Jules Verne, Michel Strogoff (1881), adapted from the novel.

Alexandre Artus is buried at Père Lachaise Cemetery.

== Works ==
- 1851: L’Étoile du berger Chasse, arranged in doubled step for fanfare
- 1857: Les Chevaliers du brouillard, quadrille Anglo-français, with Amédée Artus
- 1857: Les Viveurs de Paris
  - Chanson
  - Polka pour piano
  - Quadrille pour piano
- 1858: Faust, spectacle, choreography by Léon Espinosa
- 1858: Fanfan-la-Tulipe, quadrille for piano
- 1858: Les Fugitifs, quadrille for piano
- 1858: Le Martyre du cœur
- 1859: Fanfan-la-Tulipe, polka for piano
- 1859: Le Maitre d'école, quadrille for piano
- 1859: Polka du roi de carreau, for piano
- 1859: La Voie sacrée, ou les Étapes de la gloire, military drama in five acts and 12 tableaux, by Eugène Woestyn, Ernest Bourget and Hector Crémieux
- 1860: Le Pied de mouton, show
- 1860: La Dame de Monsoreau, drama by Alexandre Dumas and Auguste Maquet
  - Marche de la procession pour fanfare
  - Polka mazurka
  - Quadrille
- 1860: Le Marchand de coco, polka for piano
- 1860: La Sirène de Paris, ronde chantée in the drama by Eugène Grangé and Xavier de Montépin
- 1861: Le Monstre et le Magicien, couplets of the Gitanos, lyrics by Ferdinand Dugué and quadrille for piano
- 1861: Violette, polka mazurka for piano
- 1862: Les Beaux Messieurs de Bois-Doré, quadrille for piano
- 1862: La Bouquetière des Innocents, quadrille for piano
- 1862: Cadet-Roussel, quadrille for piano
- 1862: Les Hirondelles, ou pi pi pi pi pi pi ouit
- 1862: Louise, polka
- 1862: Les Mystères du Temple, polka for piano and quadrille
- 1863: François Les-bas-bleus, quadrille for piano
- 1863: Les Hirondelles de Paris, Zoude, lyrics by Eugène Moreau and Jules Dornay
- 1863: La Poissarde !, quadrille for piano
- 1863: Le Retour du soldat, cantata by Mélanie Waldor
- 1865: Rocambole (de l'Ambigu), quadrille
- 1865: La Voleuse d'enfants, ronde des chauves-souris
- 1866: Cric-crac tintamarre, ronde chantée in Rocambole, lyrics by Auguste Anicet-Bourgeois
- 1874: Les Bibelots du diable, valse des sultanes, piano
- 1875: Les Muscadins, quadrille, piano or orchestra
- 1875: Les Rendez-vous de chasses, pas redoublé
- 1876: C'est du toc et de l'occase, ronde parisienne, lyrics by L. Gothi and V. Courtès
- 1877: Champagne ! En avant !, piano or orchestra, quadrille performed in Le régiment de Champagne
- 1877: Chanson du régiment de Champagne, lyrics by Jules Claretie
- 1877: Les Scaphandres, fantaisie
- 1877: La Marmite, chanson du timonier, sung in the hundredth of Hamlet, lyrics by Théodore Barrière
- 1877: Thérésa, polka, motifs sur la pièce des Sept châteaux du diable
- 1878: Rothomago-fanfare, piano or orchestra
- 1878: Fantaisie sur des motifs du drame « Au fond de la mer »
- 1878: Miranda, waltz
- 1879: Marche de la caravane de la vénus noire, show, piano
- 1879: Léo, walz for piano performed in Les Pirates de la savane
- 1879: Rondes enfantines, fantaisie sur des motifs populaires, for piano
- 1879: Rondes et refrains populaires, ouverture pot-pourri
- 1881: Michael Strogoff by Jules Verne
  - Retraite russe et Marche de cavalerie, piano or orchestra
  - Marche triomphale, piano or orchestra
  - Quadrille, piano or orchestra
  - Marche des trompettes
  - Sonneries et batteries d'ordonnance, followed by 12 pas redoublés nouveaux, for bugles and drums
- 1882: Les Mille et Une Nuits by Adolphe d'Ennery and Paul Ferrier
  - Alchimiste-polka, piano or orchestra
  - Quadrille, piano or orchestra
  - Dinarzade, piano or orchestra
  - Shéérazade, piano or orchestra
  - Fanfare pour 4 trompettes
- 1882: Quadrille américain, piano or orchestra
- 1883: Madame Thérèse, marche des trompettes, piano
- 1883: Le Bataillon de la Sarre, pas redoublé, arranged by Victor Gentil fils, for wind orchestra
- 1883: Éden Théâtre, pas redoublé pour musique militaire ou fanfare
- 1883: Marche de Cléopâtre, arrangée pour musique militaire ou fanfare
- 1886: De Crac-polka, piano or orchestra, dance
- 1886: Marche indienne du Rajah, piano or orchestra
- 1886: Valse des bayadères, piano or orchestra
- 1887: Valse des bergers, piano or orchestra
- 1887: Les Beaux Messieurs de Bois-doré, show
- 1891: Tout-Paris, piano or orchestra
- 1891: Hymne russe, military music or fanfare
- undated: Conseil à nos amis, lyrics by Libert, set to music with accompaniment of guitar or Lyre
- undated Souvenir de Biarritz, quadrille

== Bibliography ==
- J. Goizet, A. Burtal, Dictionnaire universel du théâtre en France, vol. 2, 1867, p. 86
- Jann Pasler, La République, la musique et le citoyen (1871–1914), 2015 (Read online)
