= Artus (disambiguation) =

Artus is a name.

Artus or Arthus may also refer to:

- Artus Court, a building in Gdańsk, Poland
- Artus de Lionne (1655–1713), bishop and French missionary
- Artus Prime, a fictional planet in the Star Wars franchise
- Artus, a 2019 album by German band Schandmaul
- K11 ARTUS, a residential area in Victoria Dockside, Hong Kong
- Artas of Messapia, also known as Artus, king of the Messapians.

== See also ==
- Arthus (disambiguation)
