= Eugène Baudouin =

French painter and printmaker

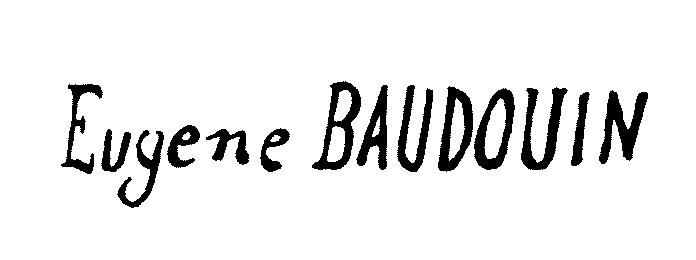
- Born: January 6, 1842; Montpellier
- Died: January 4, 1893 (aged 50); Paris
- Known for: Painter
- Movement: Impressionism

Eugène Baudouin (French pronunciation: [øʒɛn bodwɛ̃]; 6 January 1842, in Montpellier – 4 January 1893, in Paris) was a French painter and printmaker.

== Biography ==
Eugène Baudouin was an impressionist landscape painter, printmaker and illustrator.

Eugène Baudouin studied under Jean-Léon Gérôme, Auguste-Barthélemy Glaize, Léopold Flameng, François-Louis Français, Eugène Devéria, and Adrien Didier. He exhibited on a regular basis at the Paris Salon until his death in 1893. His landscapes are constructed along schematic lines and on a succession of levels in order to give the impression of a panorama. In 1889, he participated in the 1889 World's Fair in Paris.

At the Paris Salon 1882, a bust of Baudouin was exhibited by Joseph Osbach.

== Family ==
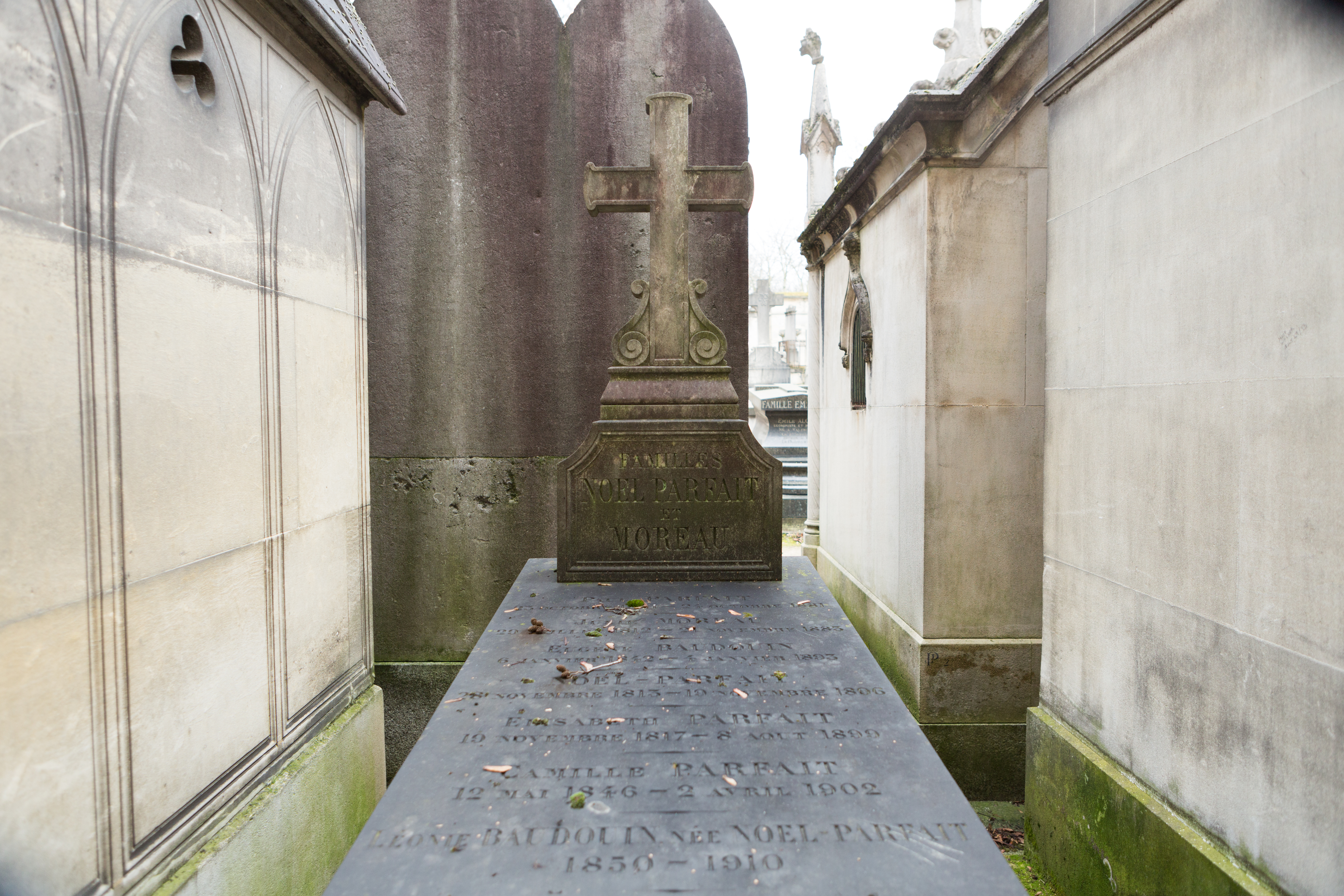
The shared grave of Eugène, his wife and other relatives at Père-Lachaise

Eugène Baudouin was married to Léonie Baudouin (1850-1910), daughter of Noël Parfait, deputy of Eure-et-Loir. They are buried together in Division 55 of Père-Lachaise cemetery in Paris.

== Paintings ==
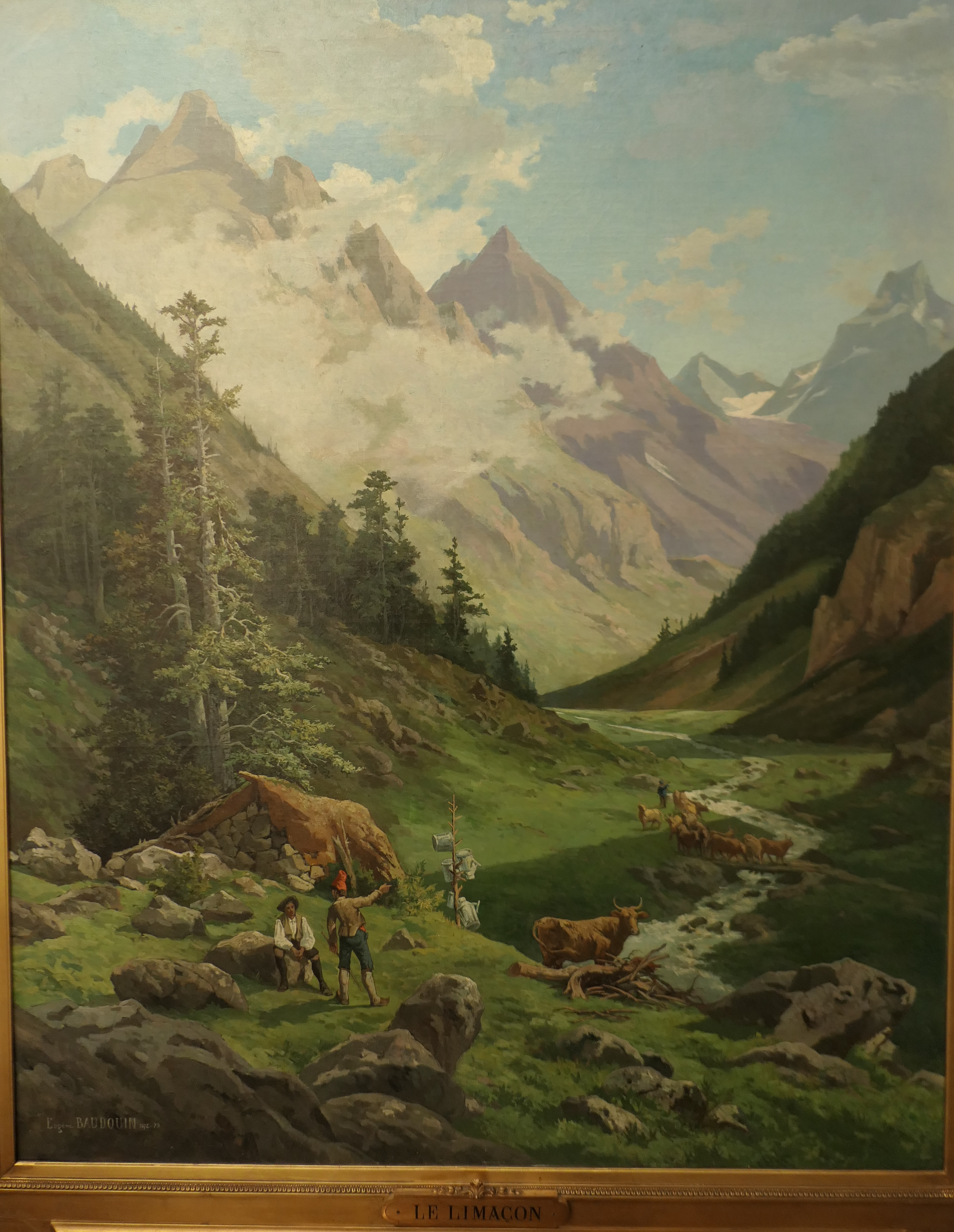
Le Limaçon (1872-73)

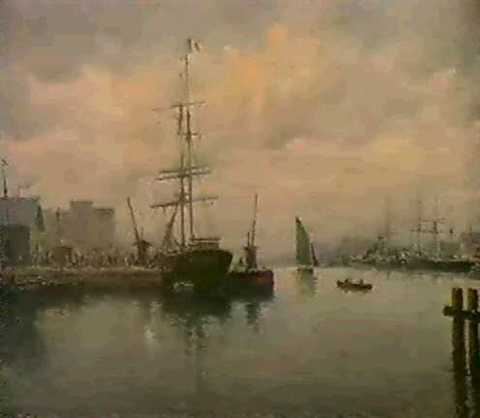
Le port de Bordeaux, (c.1870)

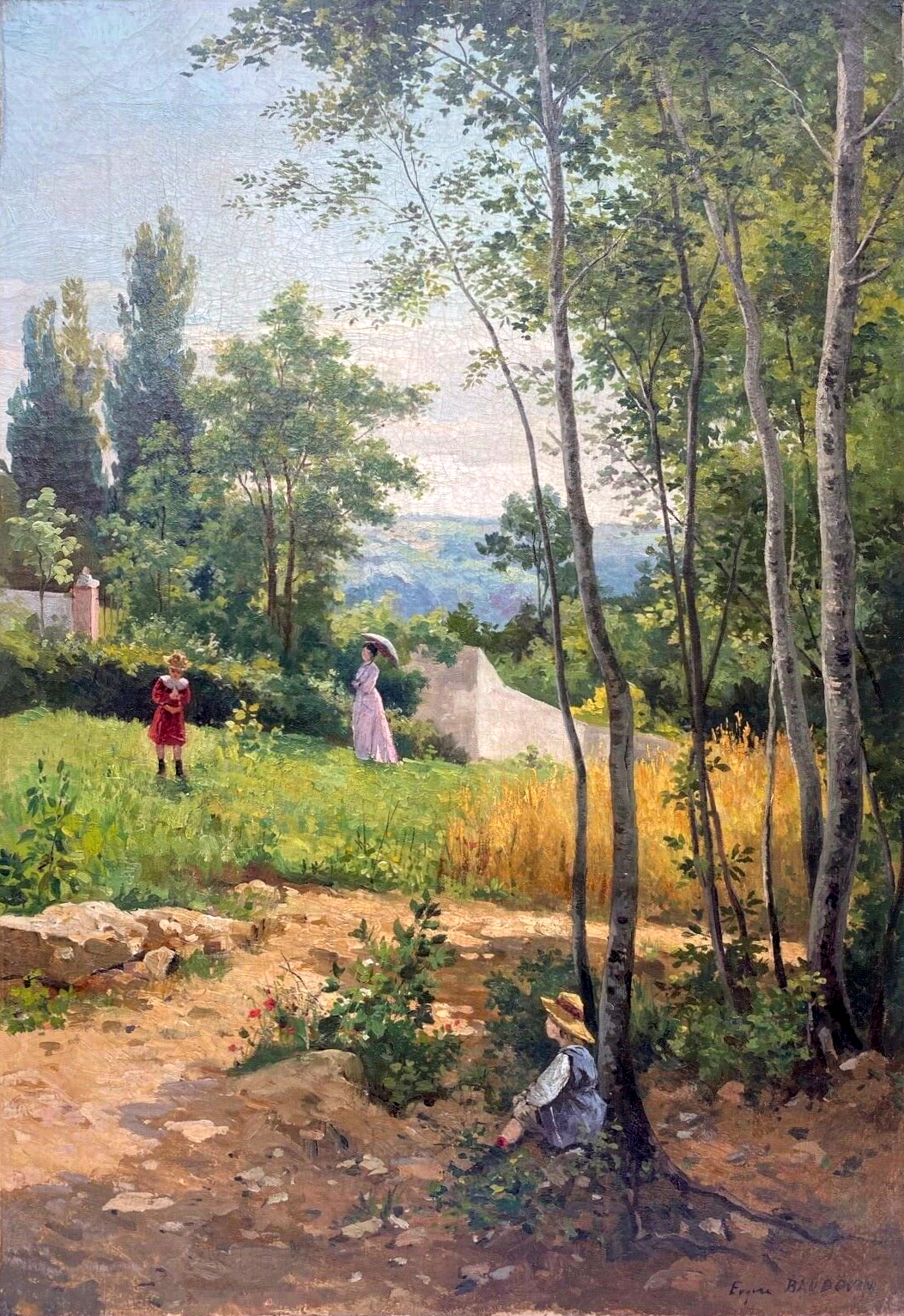
Woman with umbrella and children, (c.1873)

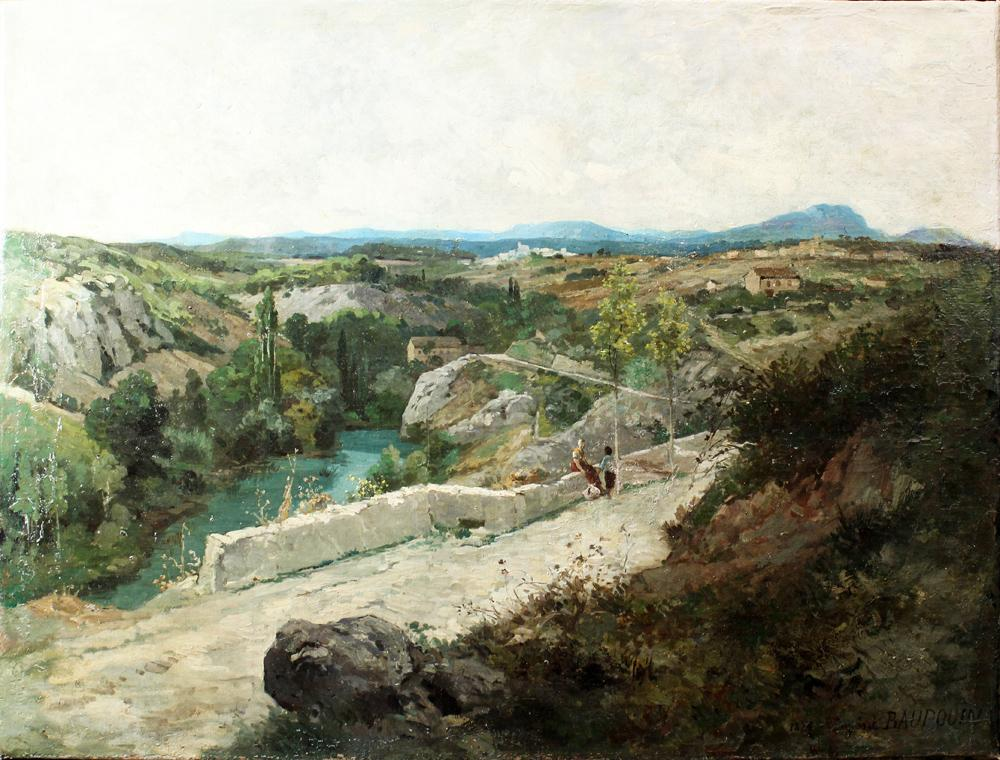
Figures in a Landscape, (1876)

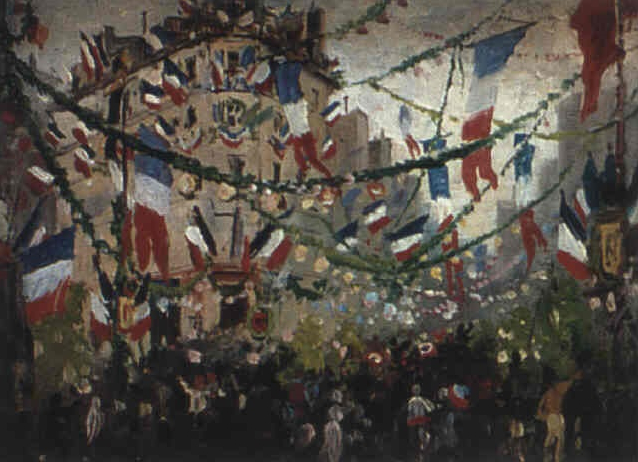
Rue de Rennes 30 juin 1878 (1878)

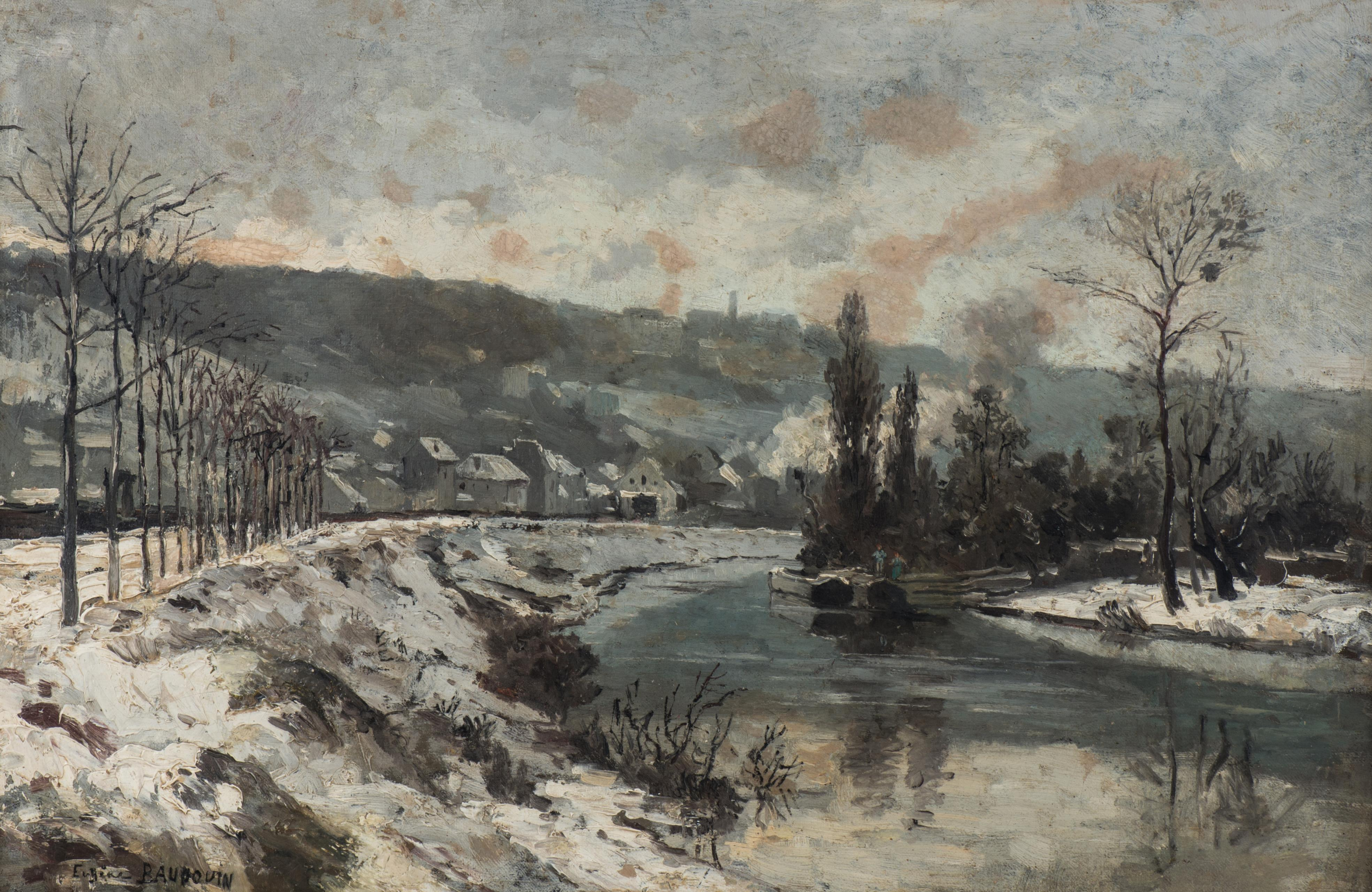
Paysage hivernal à la rivière (c.1880)

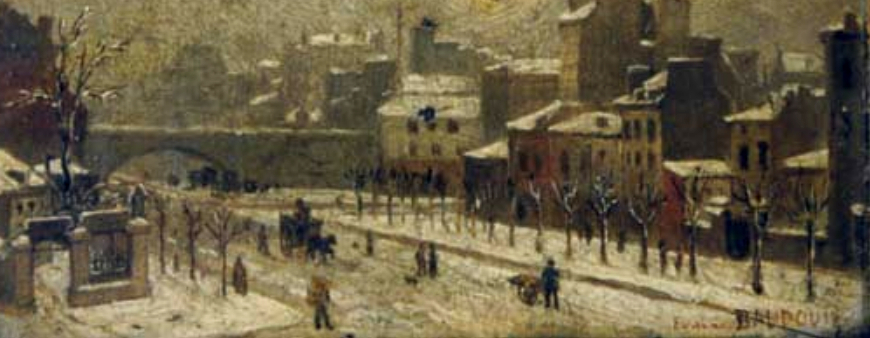
Paris street scene

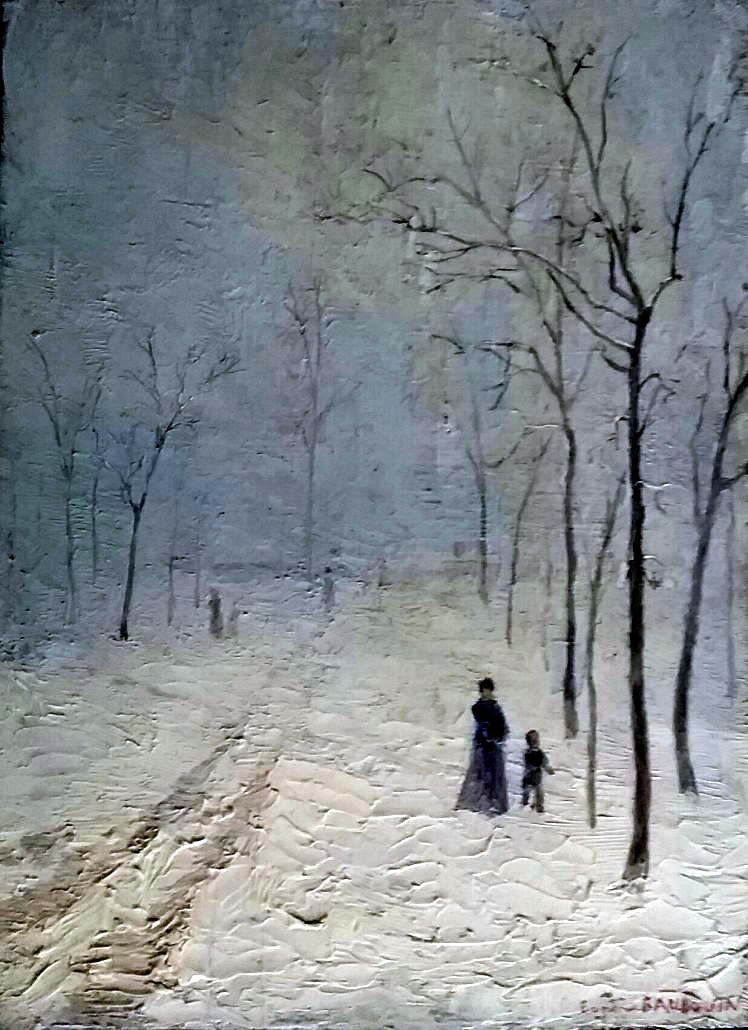
Promenade dans la neige

== Notes ==
- Bénézit, 1976 : Eugène Baudouin
