= Noël Parfait =

French politician (1813–1896)

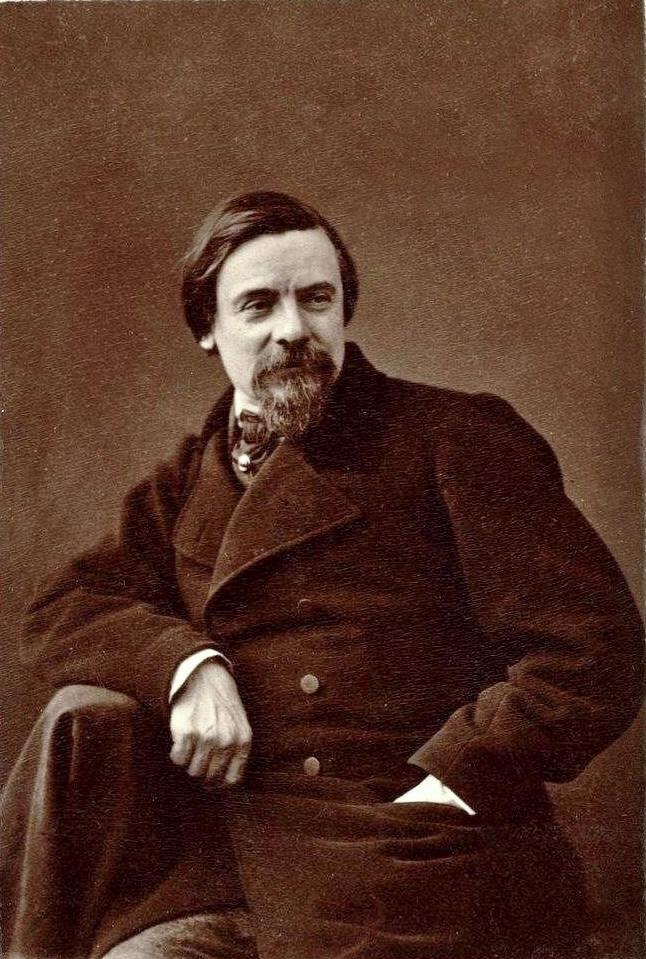
Noël Parfait byNadar c.1853

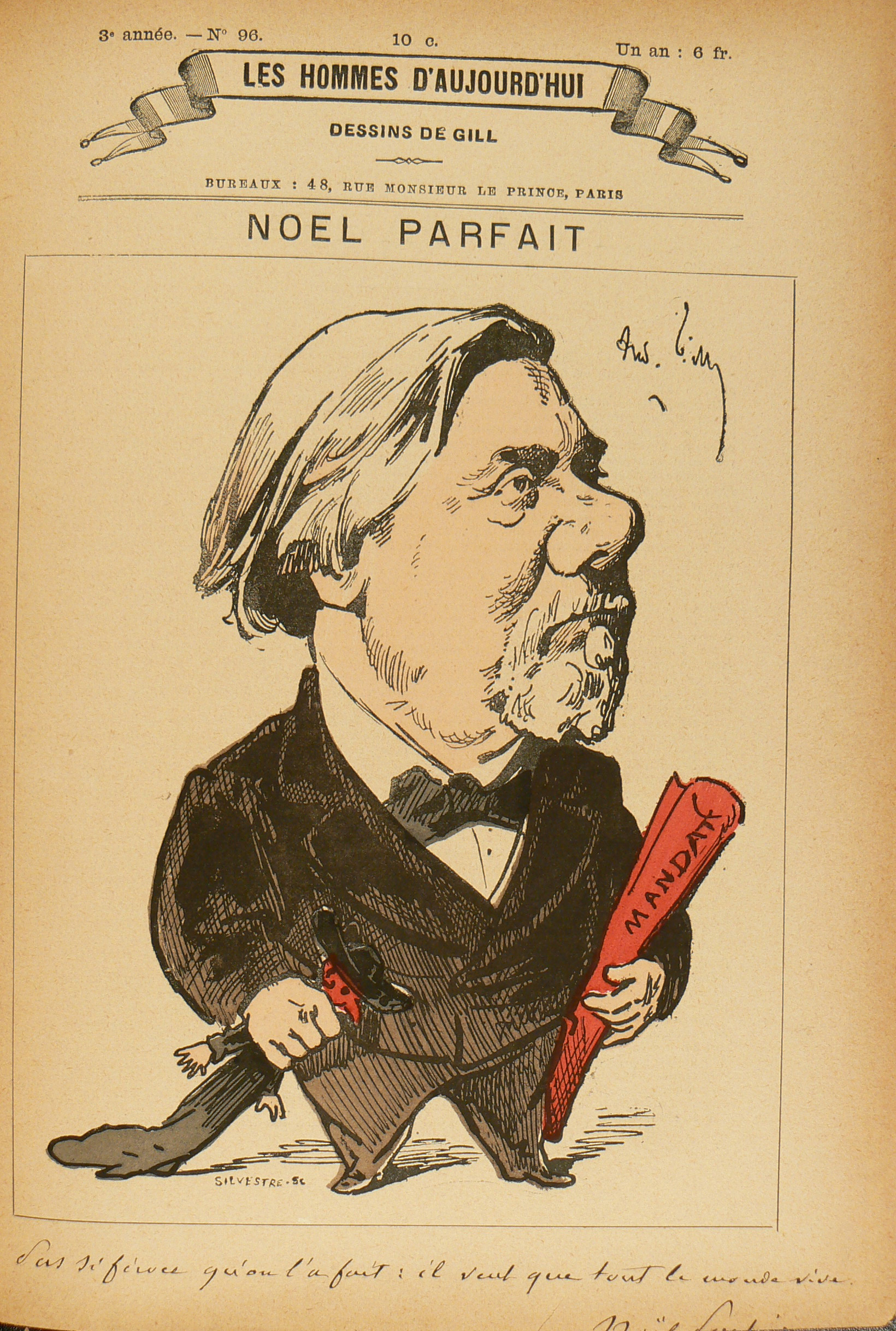
Caricature of Noël Parfait c.1881

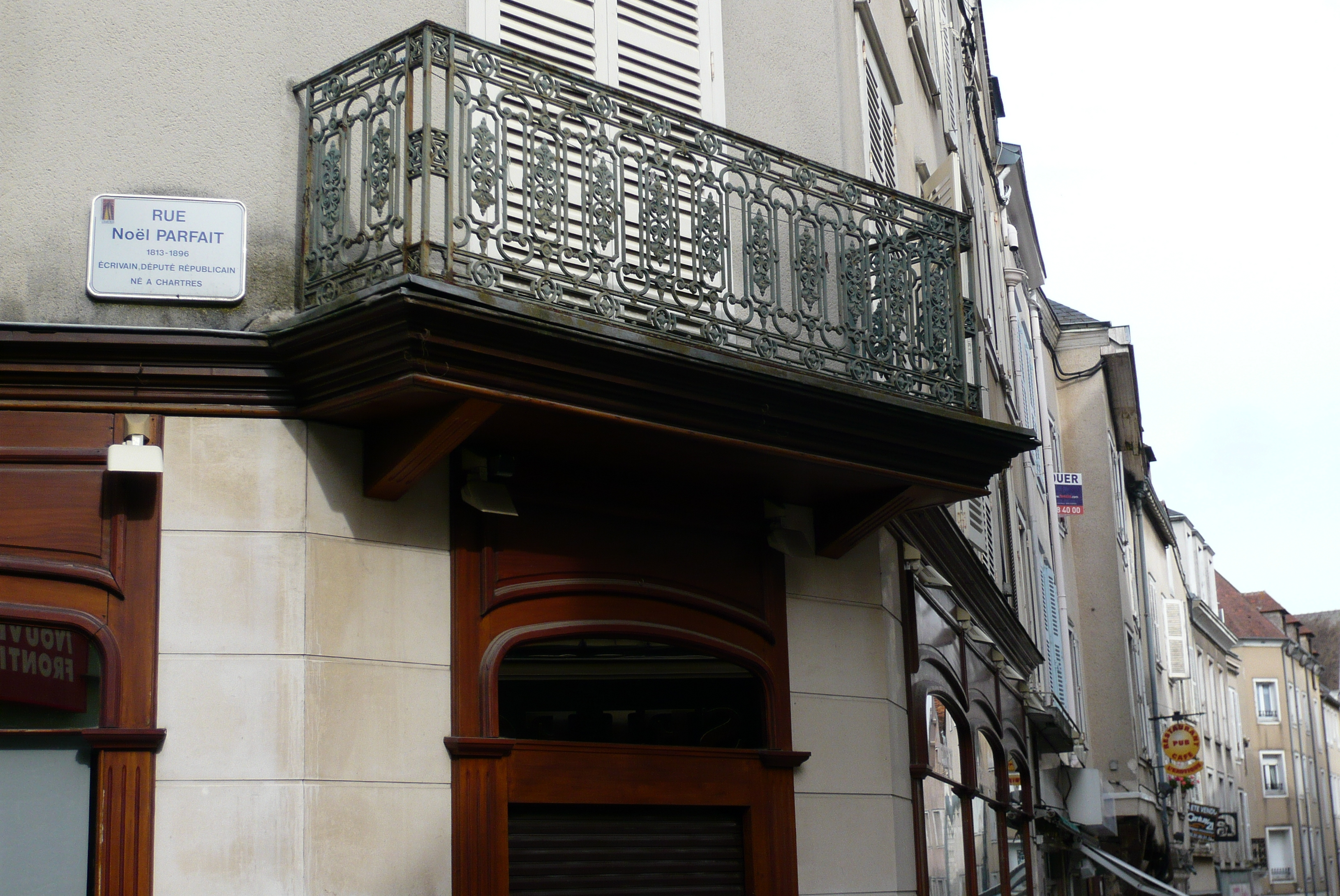
Corner of Rue Noël Parfait in Chartres

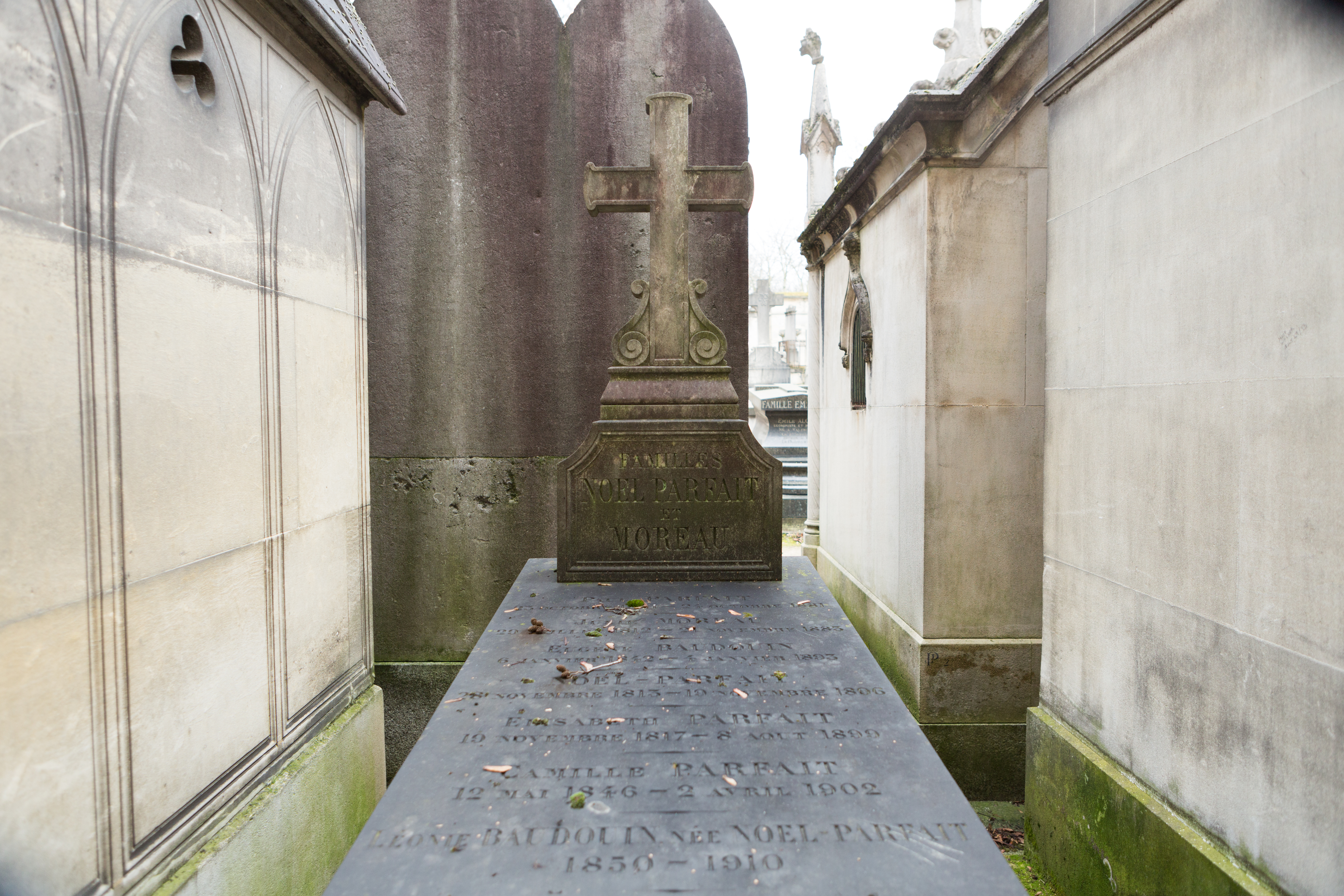
Grave of Noël Parfait in the Père Lachaise Cemetery

Noël Parfait (28 November 1813 – 19 November 1896) was a French writer, political activist and republican deputy (member of parliament).

== Biography ==
He was born at home in Chartres, (Eure-et-Loir), the son of Marie Catherine Gautier and Charles Etienne Parfait, manufacturers and merchants of stockings at Au Chat qui fume, 20 rue de la Pie, Chartres. The midwife was Louise Hetzel, mother of the writer and politician Jules Hetzel.

After studying at the collège de Chartres, he took an active part in the Trois Glorieuses (French revolution of 1830). He opposed the July Monarchy and appeared three times in court for his pamphlets against the regime, entitled Les Phillipiques (1832–1834). In May 1833, he published L'aurore d'un beau jour: épisodes des 5 et 6 juin 1832, a call to insurrection which resulted in a two-year prison sentence and a 500 franc fine. He became a journalist at La Presse in 1836. On 22 August that year, he married Elisabeth Charlotte Dalloyau in Chartres. They had three children: Jules Alfred (1838), Paul Léon (1841) and Marie Léonie (1850). Over a five-year period at La Presse, he wrote the drama series with Théophile Gautier, also collaborating with Le Siècle and Le National. In 1844, Honoré de Balzac brought him his manuscript of Les Paysans for possible publication in La Presse, because he was responsible for reading manuscripts before publication. Parfait was enthusiastic about it, obtaining permission to publish the novel from the literary director Alexandre Dujarrier.

In 1848, he became commissioner of the provisional government in Chartres and was elected a deputy of Eure-et-Loir from 1849 to 1851, sitting as part of the republican group, La Montagne. He was exiled after the coup d'état of 2 December 1851. Received by Alexandre Dumas at his home at 73 boulevard de Waterloo in Brussels, he became his secretary. There, he copied Dumas' texts and any books that Dumas borrowed. He had significant correspondence with Victor Hugo, then exiled in Guernsey, and corrected proofs of his poetry books.

He returned to France during the 1859 amnesty and wrote for several newspapers, notably Le Siècle. He became a proof-reader for the publisher Michel Lévy and as such corresponded with Gustave Flaubert on the subject of his novel L'Education sentimentale, pointing out to him faults in style.

He successfully ran for election as deputy for Eure-et-Loir again in 1871 and was re-elected five times, remaining as a deputy until 1893. He was part of the Republican Left group. He was a signatory of the manifesto of the 363 deputies who refused to trust the de Broglie government on May 16, 1877.

He suffered from cerebral anemia for several years and died in Paris on 19 November 1896, survived by his wife and daughter. After a funeral in the Sainte-Clotilde basilica, he was buried in Paris in the Père Lachaise Cemetery (55th division), along with other family members including his son-in-law, the painter Eugène Baudouin.

== Written works ==
- Les philippiques (1832–1834), pamphlets critical of Louis-Philippe, king of France:
  - Au roi : première philippique
  - Au peuple: deuxième philippique
  - Aux Ministres: troisième philippique
  - Aux Chambres: quatrième philippique
- L'aurore d'un beau jour: épisodes des 5 et 6 juin 1832
- With Charles Lafont, Un français en Sibérie, Théâtre de l'Ambigu, Paris, 1843;
- With Théophile Gautier, La Juive de Constantine, Paris, Marchant, 1846
- Notice biographique sur A.-F. Sergent, graveur en taille-douce, député de Paris à la Convention nationale, 1848;
- La Beauceronne: la fleur du tombeau (poem), Paris, Impr. de Beaulé et Maignand, 1849;
- Les républicaines : invocation à la liberté, prière du soir, paroles de M. Noël Parfait (poem) 1849
- Paroles de Noël Parfait à ses concitoyens. Troisième série. 1881–1885. A collection of twenty speeches written on the occasion of various events in the first district of Eure-et-Loir (read on Gallica).
- Le général Marceau, sa vie civile et sa vie militaire, Paris, Calmann-Lévy, 1893.

== Legacy ==
Rue Noël Parfait is named in his honour in Chartres.
