= History and Theory =

- Discipline: History
- Language: English
- Edited by: Ethan Kleinberg

Publication details
- History: 1960-present
- Publisher: Wiley-Blackwell on behalf of Wesleyan University
- Frequency: Quarterly

Standard abbreviations
- ISO 4: Hist. Theory

Indexing
- ISSN: 0018-2656 (print); 1468-2303 (web)
- LCCN: 63047837
- JSTOR: historytheory
- OCLC no.: 316297206

Links
- Journal homepage; Current issue; Online archive

History and Theory: Studies in the Philosophy of History, commonly known as History and Theory, is a quarterly peer-reviewed academic journal published by Wiley-Blackwell on behalf of Wesleyan University. The journal focuses on the nature of history, including the philosophy of history, historiography, historical methodology, critical theory, and time and culture.

== History ==
The journal was established in 1960 by George H Nadel. Its current editor-in-chief is Ethan Kleinberg (Wesleyan University).
