= Irrational Man =

1958 book by William Barrett

Irrational Man: A Study In Existential Philosophy
- Cover of the first edition
- Author: William Barrett
- Language: English
- Subject: Existentialism
- Publisher: Doubleday
- Publication date: 1958
- Publication place: United States
- Media type: Print (Hardcover and Paperback)
- Pages: 278 (1977 edition); 314 (1990 edition)
- ISBN: 978-0385031387

Irrational Man: A Study in Existential Philosophy is a 1958 book by the philosopher William Barrett, in which the author explains the philosophical background of existentialism and provides a discussion of several major existentialist thinkers, including Søren Kierkegaard, Friedrich Nietzsche, Martin Heidegger, and Jean-Paul Sartre. Irrational Man helped to introduce existentialism to the English-speaking world and has been identified as one of the most useful books that discuss the subject, but Barrett has also been criticized for endorsing irrationality and for giving a distorted and misleading account of Georg Wilhelm Friedrich Hegel.

== Summary ==
Barrett discusses existentialism and its background, including the philosophical tradition to which existentialism was a reaction. He outlines the views of philosophers from Plato to Hegel, tracing the development of ideas about being, ontology, and metaphysics. He also attempts to explain how the study of science, history, modern art, and religion, specifically Protestantism, highlighted the background growth of existentialism. He argues that the modern world is becoming increasingly secularized and that faith has become "attenuated". He maintains that during the modern period, a questionable new "image of man" has emerged. Surveying trends in art, Barrett writes that the Dada movement was "one of the valid eruptions of the irrational in this century."

Four existentialist thinkers - Kierkegaard, Nietzsche, Heidegger, and Sartre - receive extended discussion from Barrett, who explains their main ideas and philosophical terminology. Barrett more briefly discusses other existentialist thinkers such as Karl Jaspers, Nikolai Berdyaev, Martin Buber, Miguel de Unamuno, Gabriel Marcel, Simone de Beauvoir, and Albert Camus, as well as some artists and writers he considers existentialist, such as the Russian novelist Fyodor Dostoyevsky, whom he compares to Nietzsche, crediting him with anticipating Nietzsche's insights into the will to power in Crime and Punishment (1866).

Discussing Kierkegaard, Barrett maintains that the Danish philosopher is relevant even to non-Christians because of his "appeal to their own existence." Barrett writes that, "Being a Christian, after all, is one way of being a man - for Kierkegaard personally it was the only way - and to have this way illumined, to be summoned to its tasks, is also to be called on to be a man, however divergent our own choice of a way may be." Barrett adds that, "Kierkegaard stated the question of Christianity so nakedly, made it turn so decisively about the individual and his quest for his own eternal happiness, that all religious writers after him seem by comparison to be symbolical, institutional, or metaphorical - in a word, gnostic. Perhaps the very nakedness of Kierkegaard's statement of faith makes it impossible for Christianity to go anywhere but in the direction of some kind of gnosticism."

In his discussion of Nietzsche, Barrett writes that, "Nietzsche's fate is one [of] the great episodes in man's historic effect to know himself. After him, the problem of man could never quite return to its pre-Nietzschean level." Barrett calls Thus Spoke Zarathustra (1883–1891) Nietzsche's "most lyrical book" and "the expression of the loneliest Nietzsche."

Finally, Barrett applies existentialist thought to the world of the late 1950s, during the Cold War. Irrational Man includes two appendices, "Negation, Finitude, and the Nature of Man", which reprints a 1957 paper by Barrett, and "Existence and Analytic Philosophers", a highly technical discussion of existentialism in relation to analytic philosophy.

== Publication history ==
Irrational Man was first published in 1958 by Doubleday & Company, Inc. Later editions include those published by Greenwood Press, Inc. in 1977 and Anchor Books in 1990.

== Reception ==
Irrational Man received a positive review from Robert Jordan in The Nation. Later discussions of the book include those by Paul Stuewe in Quill & Quire, and Andrew Pulver in The Guardian. Jordan described the book as a "spirited defense" of the methods and conclusions of existentialist philosophy. Stuewe described the book as "perhaps the best popular book on existentialism". Pulver identified the book as an influence on filmmaker Woody Allen, observing that the title of his film Irrational Man (2015) is clearly inspired by Barrett's book, which "no doubt formed part of Allen’s self-taught intellectual life in the late 50s and early 60s".

The theologian John Macquarrie described Irrational Man as one of the most useful books about existentialism. In The Ominous Parallels (1982), the Objectivist philosopher Leonard Peikoff presented Irrational Man as an example of a prominent philosopher endorsing irrationality, citing Barrett's comments about Dada. The philosopher Jon Stewart accused Barrett of caricaturing, and propagating myths about, Hegel. Stewart deemed Barrett guilty of misrepresenting Hegel as a "cosmic rationalist" who, like the philosopher Friedrich Wilhelm Joseph Schelling, and some romantics, believed in a metaphysical world soul.
