= Frédéric Soulié =

French writer

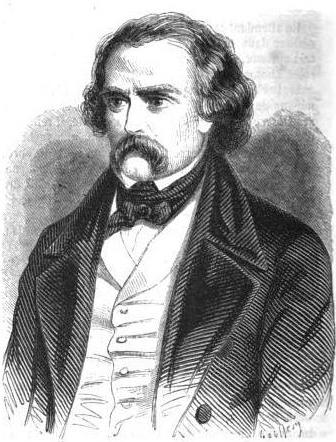
Frédéric Soulié

Frédéric Soulié (23 December 1800 – 23 September 1847) was a French popular novelist and playwright. He wrote over forty sensation novels like Les Mémoires du diable (1837-8).

== Life ==
Frédéric Soulié was born in Foix, the son of a philosopher professor. He gained a law degree before going to Paris to pursue a literary life. Though his early historical dramas were unsuccessful, he gained more attention with the novel Les deux cadavres (1832).

== Works ==
=== Plays ===
- Roméo et Juliette, 1828.
- Christine à Fontainebleau, 1829.
- Clotilde, 1832.
- Diane de Chivri, 1839
- Le fils de la folle
- Le Proscrit, 1840
- La Closerie des Genêts, 1846.

=== Novels ===
- Les deux cadavres [The two corpses], 1832.
- Le vicomte de Béziers, 1834.
- Le comte de Toulouse, 1835.
- Les mémoires du diable [Memoirs of the devil], 1837-8. (translated into English by Black Coat Press in 2 volumes)
- Les prétendus [The pretenders], 1842.
- La lionne [The lion], 1846
- La comtesse de Monrion, 1847
- Confession générale
- Eulalie Pons
- La Comtesse de Mourion
- Saturnin Fichet
