= Ethan Kleinberg =

Historian

Ethan Kleinberg is an intellectual historian currently appointed as Class of 1958 Distinguished Professor of History and Letters at Wesleyan University. He is also Editor-in-Chief of the academic journal History and Theory and co-author of the Wild On Collective's Theses on Theory and History.

Kleinberg's research focuses on European intellectual history, critical theory, and the philosophy of history. His first book, Generation Existential, explored the reception of Martin Heidegger's philosophy in France from 1927 to 1961. He has also written on post-structuralism and Deconstruction, especially in his second book, Haunting History, and on psychoanalysis and Judaism. Kleinberg's most recent book is Emmanuel Levinas's Talmudic Turn. Kleinberg also works on the metaphysics and time and presence in historical writing.

== Academic career ==
Kleinberg did his undergraduate work at UC Berkeley (BA 1989), majoring in interdisciplinary humanities. He then entered the graduate program in the Department of History at UCLA, where he earned his PhD in 1998. He was appointed as Assistant Professor at Iowa State University in 2000, but left in 2001 for a joint appointment in the College of Letters and History Department at Wesleyan University.

In 2006, Kleinberg's book Generation Existential: Heidegger’s Philosophy in France, 1927-1961 was awarded the Morris D. Forkosch prize for the best book in intellectual history by the Journal of the History of Ideas. He served as Director of the College of Letters from 2007-2010, and in 2012 became the Director of Wesleyan’s Center for the Humanities as well as Editor-in-Chief of History and Theory. In October 2021, he delivered the annual Koselleck Lecture at Bielefeld University, where he had been selected as the Reinhart Koselleck Visiting Professor.

== Bibliography ==
- Generation Existential: Heiddegger’s Philosophy in France, 1927-1961 (Cornell University Press, 2005)
- Haunting History: for a deconstructive approach to the past (Stanford University Press, 2017)
- Emmanuel Levinas's Talmudic Turn: Philosophy and Jewish Thought (Stanford University Press, 2021)
- Presence: Philosophy, History and Cultural Theory for the 21st Century co-edited with Ranjan Ghosh (Cornell University Press, 2013)
- Theses on Theory and History, by the Wild On Collective (Ethan Kleinberg, Joan Wallach Scott, Gary Wilder) (https://historyandtheory.org/theoryrevolt, 2018)

== See also ==
- Wesleyan biography
- H-net biography
- Columbia biography
