= William Barrett (philosopher) =

American philosopher (1913–1992)

- Born: William Christopher Barrett; December 30, 1913; New York City, U.S.
- Died: September 8, 1992 (aged 78); Tarrytown, New York, U.S.

Education
- Doctoral advisor: F. J. E. Woodbridge

Philosophical work
- Era: 20th-century philosophy
- Region: Western philosophy
- School: Marxism (early), existentialism
- Institutions: New York University, Pace University
- Main interests: History of philosophy
- Notable ideas: Barrett's law

William Christopher Barrett (December 30, 1913 – September 8, 1992) was an American philosopher who was professor of philosophy at New York University from 1950 to 1979, and later at Pace University.

== Biography ==
Precociously, Barrett began post-secondary studies at the City College of New York when 15 years old. He received his PhD at Columbia University. He was an editor of Partisan Review and later the literary critic of The Atlantic Monthly magazine. Barrett wrote philosophical works for nonexperts, including Irrational Man and The Illusion of Technique, which remain in print.

Like many intellectuals of his generation, Barrett flirted with Marxism before turning his energies to providing readable introductions to European philosophical schools, notably existentialism.

Barrett was a good friend of the poet Delmore Schwartz for many years. He knew many other literary figures of the day, including Edmund Wilson, Philip Rahv, and Albert Camus. He was deeply influenced by the philosophies of Friedrich Nietzsche, Søren Kierkegaard, and Martin Heidegger and was the editor of D. T. Suzuki's 1956 classic Zen Buddhism. In fiction, his taste ran to the great Russians, particularly Fyodor Dostoyevsky.

Barrett died in 1992, aged 78, of cancer of the esophagus. He was survived by his daughter, Nell Barrett, and her children, Clinton and Georgia.

Barrett's law is named for him: "not everyone who might read the productions of scholarly writers is an expert in the fields discussed" (p. 99).

== Works ==
- What Is Existentialism? (1947), Partisan Review, 1964 Random House edition: ISBN 0-394-17388-0
- Irrational Man: A Study in Existential Philosophy (1958), Doubleday, Anchor Books paperback (1962): ISBN 978-0-385-03138-7
- Philosophy in the Twentieth Century (1962), four volumes, William Barrett and Henry D. Aiken, editors, Random House
- Time of Need: Forms of Imagination in the Twentieth Century (1972), Harper Bros. ISBN 0-06-131754-3
- The Illusion of Technique: A Search for Meaning in a Technological Civilization (1979), Doubleday, ISBN 978-0-385-11202-4
- The Truants: Adventures Among the Intellectuals (1982), a memoir, Doubleday, ISBN 978-0-385-17328-5
- Death of the Soul: From Descartes to the Computer (1986), Doubleday, ISBN 978-0-385-17327-8

== See also ==
- American philosophy
- List of American philosophers
- List of philosophers
- New York University Department of Philosophy
