= 1966 in literature =

This article contains information about the literary events and publications of 1966.

== Events ==
- February
  - The Nottingham-based chain of pharmacy stores Boots UK closes the last of its circulating "Booklovers' Library" branches.
  - Managers of the Royal Court Theatre in London are convicted of presenting an unlicenced play, last November's premiere of Edward Bond's Saved. This prosecution is considered influential in the abolition of the Theatres Act 1843 under which it is brought.
- February 1 – Chinese playwright Tian Han is attacked for his historical play Xie Yaohuan (1961), an opening salvo in the Cultural Revolution.
- February 10 – Author Jacqueline Susann has her first novel, Valley of the Dolls, published. From a friend she obtains a list of the bookstores on whose sales figures The New York Times relies for its bestseller list. She then uses her own money to buy large quantities of her book at these stores, causing it to head the list. Valley of the Dolls incidentally comes to rank among the best-selling novels of all time.
- February 13 – Following the Sinyavsky–Daniel trial, dissident writers Yuli Daniel and Andrei Sinyavsky are sentenced to hard labour for "anti-Soviet activity".
- March 9 – J. R. R. Tolkien writes to Roger Verhulst, expressing concerns about a proposed book about him by W. H. Auden, saying, "I regard such things as premature impertinences.... I cannot believe that they have a usefulness to justify the distaste and irritation given to the victim," but adding: "I owe Mr. Auden a debt of gratitude for the generosity with which he has supported and encouraged me since the first appearance of The Lord of the Rings."
- March 21 – In a landmark obscenity case, Memoirs v. Massachusetts, the Supreme Court of the United States rules that the hitherto banned novel Fanny Hill (John Cleland's Memoirs of a Woman of Pleasure, 1749) does not meet the Roth Standard for obscenity.
- April 14 – Noël Coward's A Song at Twilight, his only play to deal openly with homosexuality, premieres in London.
- By June – Aleksandr Solzhenitsyn completes his semi-autobiographical novel Cancer Ward («Раковый Корпус», Rakovy Korpus) and sends the manuscript to the Russian literary magazine Novy Mir. The editor, Tvardosky, equivocates and requests cuts, so Solzhenitsyn arranges for it be distributed as samizdat, then to be discussed at a meeting in Moscow of the Central Writers' Club on November 17.
- June 14 – The Roman Curia abolishes the Index Librorum Prohibitorum of books banned by the Catholic Church, after 427 years.
- June 16 – Blackwell's opens the 930 m^{2} Norrington Room in their main bookshop in Broad Street, Oxford.
- June 23 – Octopussy and The Living Daylights appears as the final collection of James Bond short stories by the character's creator, Ian Fleming, who died in 1964.
- July 24 – American poet and critic Frank O'Hara is hit by a dune buggy on Fire Island beach. He dies of his injuries the following day.
- August 24 – Tom Stoppard's tragicomedy Rosencrantz and Guildenstern Are Dead is first played, at the Edinburgh Festival Fringe. Despite small audiences, Stoppard's reputation is made by a review by Ronald Bryden in The Observer.
- September 8 – The first UNESCO International Literacy Day is celebrated.
- September 9 – New Beacon Books, the first Caribbean publishing house in England, releases its first title, Foundations by John La Rose.
- October 21 – Jacques Derrida delivers a lecture, La Structure, le signe et le jeu dans le discours des sciences humaines, to a structuralism colloquium at Johns Hopkins University, giving international prominence to his work on literary theory.
- November 3–4 – The 1966 flood of the Arno in Florence causes severe damage to libraries, including the National Central Library and Gabinetto Vieusseux.
- November 28 – Truman Capote's Black and White Ball ("The Party of the Century") is held in New York City. The guest of honor, The Washington Post publisher Katharine Graham, later says: "Truman called me up that summer and said, 'I think you need cheering up. And I'm going to give you a ball.'...I was...sort of baffled....I felt a little bit like Truman was going to give the ball anyway and that I was part of the props."
- December – Moskva magazine begins the first publication of Mikhail Bulgakov's novel The Master and Margarita (Ма́стер и Маргари́та), begun in 1928 but left incomplete on the author's death in 1940. It appears in two parts with portions omitted or altered.
- unknown date – The first modern revival of a play by Bhāsa, Madhyamavyayoga, directed by Shanta Gandhi, is performed in a Hindi translation.

== New books ==
=== Fiction ===
- Chinua Achebe – A Man of the People
- Robert H. Adleman (with Col. George Walton) – The Devil's Brigade
- Elechi Amadi – The Concubine
- Kingsley Amis – The Anti-Death League
- June Arnold – Applesauce
- Isaac Asimov – Fantastic Voyage
- Margaret Atwood
  - The Circle Game
  - Expeditions
  - Speeches for Doctor Frankenstein
- Louis Auchincloss – The Embezzler
- Nigel Balchin – In the Absence of Mrs. Petersen
- J. G. Ballard
  - The Crystal World
  - The Impossible Man
- Henry Bauchau – La Déchirure
- John Bingham – The Double Agent
- Paul Bowles – Up Above the World
- Ray Bradbury – S Is for Space
- Victor Canning – Doubled in Diamonds
- John Dickson Carr – Panic in Box C
- Angela Carter – Shadow Dance
- Agatha Christie – Third Girl
- James Clavell – Tai-Pan
- Robert Crichton – The Secret of Santa Vittoria
- Cecil Day-Lewis – The Morning after Death
- Simone de Beauvoir – Les Belles Images
- August Derleth and Mark Schorer – Colonel Markesan and Less Pleasant People
- Philip K. Dick
  - The Crack in Space
  - Now Wait for Last Year
  - The Unteleported Man
- Allen Drury – Capable of Honor
- Friedrich Dürrenmatt – Der Meteor
- Shusaku Endo (遠藤 周作) – Silence (沈黙, Chinmoku)
- Ian Fleming – Octopussy and The Living Daylights
- John Fowles – The Magus
- L.P. Hartley – The Betrayal
- Robert A. Heinlein – The Moon Is a Harsh Mistress
- Aidan Higgins – Langrishe, Go Down
- Robert E. Howard and L. Sprague de Camp – Conan the Adventurer
- Michael Innes – The Bloody Wood
- B. S. Johnson – Trawl
- Daniel Keyes – Flowers for Algernon
- Anatoly Kuznetsov – Babi Yar: A Document in the Form of a Novel («Бабий яр. Роман-документ»)
- Arthur La Bern – Goodbye Piccadilly, Farewell Leicester Square
- J. M. G. Le Clézio – The Flood
- Violette Leduc – Thérèse et Isabelle
- José Lezama Lima – Paradiso
- Audrey Erskine Lindop – I Start Counting
- H. P. Lovecraft and Divers Hands – The Dark Brotherhood and Other Pieces
- John D. MacDonald – One Fearful Yellow Eye
- Compton Mackenzie – Paper Lives
- Alistair MacLean – When Eight Bells Toll
- Larry McMurtry – Last Picture Show
- Bernard Malamud – The Fixer
- Marga Minco – Een leeg huis (An empty house)
- Gladys Mitchell – The Croaking Raven
- Grace Ogot – The Promised Land
- Anthony Powell – The Soldier's Art
- J. B. Priestley – Salt Is Leaving
- Thomas Pynchon – The Crying of Lot 49
- Seabury Quinn – Carnacki, the Ghost-Finder
- Gerard Reve – Nader tot U (Nearer to Thee)
- Jean Rhys – Wide Sargasso Sea
- Karl Ristikivi – Rõõmulaul
- Tayeb Salih – Season of Migration to the North (موسم الهجرة إلى الشمال, Mawsim al-Hijrah ilâ al-Shamâl)
- Giorgio Scerbanenco
  - A Private Venus
  - Traitors to All
- Leonardo Sciascia – A ciascuno il suo
- Paul Scott – The Jewel in the Crown
- Aleksandr Solzhenitsyn – Cancer Ward
- Adela Rogers St. Johns – Tell No Man
- Krishna Sobti – Mitro Marjani (To Hell with you Mitro!)
- Rex Stout – Death of a Doxy
- Jacqueline Susann – Valley of the Dolls
- Leslie Thomas – The Virgin Soldiers
- Roderick Thorp – The Detective
- Jack Vance – The Eyes of the Overworld
- Mario Vargas Llosa – The Green House (La Casa Verde)
- Patrick White – The Solid Mandala
- Roger Zelazny
  - The Dream Master
  - This Immortal

=== Children and young people ===
- Chinua Achebe – Chike and the River
- Lloyd Alexander – The Castle of Llyr
- Rev. W. Awdry – Main Line Engines (twenty-first in The Railway Series of 42 books)
- Nina Bawden – The Witch's Daughter
- Roald Dahl – The Magic Finger
- Leon Garfield – Devil-in-the-Fog
- Norma Kassirer – Magic Elizabeth
- Charles Keeping – Charley, Charlotte and the Golden Canary
- Clive King – The 22 Letters
- Ruth Park
  - The Muddle-Headed Wombat at School
  - The Muddle-Headed Wombat in the Snow
- Bill Peet
  - Capyboppy
  - Farewell to Shady Glade
- Otfried Preußler – The Little Ghost
- Tomi Ungerer – Moon Man
- Eduard Uspensky – Crocodile Gena and His Friends («Крокодил Гена и его друзья»)
- Jill Paton Walsh – Hengest's Tale

=== Drama ===
- Edward Albee – A Delicate Balance
- Noël Coward – Suite in Three Keys (A Song at Twilight, Shadows of the Evening and Come Into the Garden, Maud)
- Barbara Garson – MacBird!
- Günter Grass – The Plebeians Rehearse the Uprising (Die Plebejer proben den Aufstand)
- Gwenlyn Parry – Saer Doliau (Doll Doctor)
- Tom Stoppard – Rosencrantz and Guildenstern Are Dead
- Zdeněk Svěrák, Jiří Šebánek and Ladislav Smoljak – Akt (The Nude, introducing the Czech fictional character Jára Cimrman)
- Luis Valdez – Quinta Temporada

=== Poetry ===
- Seamus Heaney – Death of a Naturalist
- Anne Sexton – Live or Die

=== Non-fiction ===
- Geoffrey Blainey – The Tyranny of Distance: How Distance Shaped Australia's History
- Dictionary of Canadian Biography, volume 1.
- Truman Capote – In Cold Blood (non-fiction novel - book publication)
- William Crossing (died 1928) – The Dartmoor Worker (anthology)
- L. Sprague de Camp and Catherine Crook de Camp – Spirits, Stars, and Spells
- Edward Jay Epstein – Inquest
- Margery Fish – An All the Year Garden
- Michel Foucault – The Order of Things (Les Mots et les choses: une archéologie des sciences humaines)
- Jon and Rumer Godden – Two Under the Indian Sun
- Ernst H. Gombrich – Norm and Form. Studies in the Art of the Renaissance
- A. E. Hotchner – Papa Hemingway
- P. J. Kavanagh – The Perfect Stranger
- Mark Lane – Rush to Judgment
- Alasdair MacIntyre – A Short History of Ethics
- Nancy Mitford – The Sun King
- María Moliner – Diccionario de uso del español
- Anaïs Nin – The Diary of Anaïs Nin, Volume I: 1931–1934
- Arthur M. Schlesinger Jr. – A Thousand Days
- Hunter S. Thompson – Hell's Angels: The Strange and Terrible Saga of the Outlaw Motorcycle Gangs
- Frances Yates – The Art of Memory

== Births ==
- February 14 – Alex Scarrow, British novelist
- February 24 – Alain Mabanckou, Francophone Congolese novelist
- March 4 – Dav Pilkey, American author and illustrator
- March 5 – Mark Z. Danielewski, American fiction author
- April 12 – Jim Duffy, Irish political writer
- April 15 – Cressida Cowell, English children's writer
- April 20 – David Chalmers, Australian philosopher and cognitive scientist
- April 26 – Natasha Trethewey, American poet
- July 4 – Brian Selznick, American children's writer and illustrator
- July 21 – Sarah Waters, Welsh novelist
- September 24 – Rhys Hughes, Welsh short-story writer
- October 7 – Sherman Alexie, Native-American poet and fiction writer
- October 19 – David Vann, Alaskan-born fiction writer and sailor
- November 17 – Jane Holland (Victoria Lamb, etc.), English poet and novelist
- November 22 – Mónica Montañés, Venezuelan screenwriter and journalist
- November 30 – David Nicholls, English novelist and screenwriter
- December 27 – Chris Abani, Nigerian poet and novelist
- December 29 – Christian Kracht, Swiss novelist and journalist
- unknown date – Helen Zahavi, English novelist and translator

== Deaths ==
- January 18 – Kathleen Norris, American novelist (born 1880)
- February 5 – Louisa Martindale, British physician, writer, magistrate and prison commissioner (born 1872)
- February 12 – Elio Vittorini, Italian novelist (born 1908)
- February 25 – Victor Kravchenko, Soviet writer (born 1905)
- March 10 – Frank O'Connor, Irish short-story writer (born 1903)
- April 1 – Brian O'Nolan (Flann O'Brien), Irish satirist (heart attack, born 1911)
- April 2 – C. S. Forester, English historical novelist (born 1899)
- April 10 (Easter Day) – Evelyn Waugh, English novelist, biographer and travel writer (heart failure, born 1903)
- April 13 – Georges Duhamel, French novelist (born 1884)
- May 7 – Stanisław Jerzy Lec, Polish aphorist and poet (born 1909)
- June 7
  - Yoshishige Abe, Japanese philosopher and politician (born 1883)
  - Jean Arp, Alsatian poet, sculptor and painter (born 1886)
- June 10 – Henry Treece, English children's historical novelist and poet (born 1911)
- June 30 – Margery Allingham, English crime novelist (born 1904)
- July 19 – Vladimir Cavarnali, Bessarabian-born Romanian poet, editor, and journalist (born 1910)
- July 20 – Anne Beffort, Luxembourg literary writer and biographer (born 1880)
- July 25 – Frank O'Hara, American poet (ruptured liver, born 1926)
- August 2 or 3 – Tristan Klingsor (Léon Leclère), French fantaisiste poet, painter and musician (born 1874)
- August 6 – Cordwainer Smith (Paul Myron Anthony Linebarger), American science fiction author (heart attack, born 1913)
- August 12 – Artur Alliksaar, Estonian poet (cancer, born 1923)
- September 3 – Fu Lei, Chinese translator (born 1908)
- September 14 – Dorothy Whipple, English novelist and children's writer (born 1893)
- September 25 – Mina Loy, English-born poet and artist (born 1882)
- September 28 – André Breton, French Surrealist poet and author (born 1896)
- October 30 – Yórgos Theotokás, Greek novelist (born 1906)
- November 24 – Ramón Amaya Amador, Honduran author (born 1916
- November 26 – Siegfried Kracauer, German journalist and critic (born 1889)
- December 23 – Heimito von Doderer, Austrian author (born 1896)

== Awards ==
- Alfaguara Prize: Manuel Vicent, Pascua y naranjas
- Cholmondeley Award: Ted Walker, Stevie Smith
- Eric Gregory Award: Robin Fulton, Seamus Heaney, Hugo Williams
  - See 1966 Governor General's Awards for a complete list of winners and finalists for those awards.
- Friedenspreis des Deutschen Buchhandels: Augustin Bea and Willem Visser 't Hooft (together)
- Hugo Award: Frank Herbert, Dune and Roger Zelazny, ...And Call Me Conrad
- James Tait Black Memorial Prize for fiction: Christine Brooke-Rose, Such, and Aidan Higgins, Langrishe, Go Down
- James Tait Black Memorial Prize for biography: Geoffrey Keynes, The Life of William Harvey
- Miles Franklin Award: Peter Mathers, Trap
- Nebula Award (first): Samuel R. Delany, Babel–17 and Daniel Keyes, Flowers for Algernon
- Newbery Medal for children's literature: Elizabeth Borton de Treviño, I, Juan de Pareja
- Nobel Prize in Literature: Shmuel Yosef Agnon, Nelly Sachs
- Premio Nadal: Vicente Soto, La zancada
- Prix Goncourt: Edmonde Charles-Roux, Oublier Palerme
- Prix Médicis: Marie-Claire Blais, Une saison dans la vie d'Emmanuel
- Pulitzer Prize for Drama: no award given
- Pulitzer Prize for Fiction: Katherine Anne Porter, Collected Stories
- Pulitzer Prize for Poetry: Richard Eberhart, Selected Poems
- Viareggio Prize: Alfonso Gatto, La storia delle vittime
