= Philippe Roman =

French painter

Philippe Roman (1927–1999) was a French painter.

== Biography ==
Roman was born in Saint-Sauveur, Alsace, into a Protestant family. His mother died shortly after his birth. Physically abused by his stepmother, ignored by his father, Roman later described his childhood as “a hell,” one ended only by the German invasion of 1940, which scattered the household.

Roman began to paint while studying chemistry. He then took a position a bank in Beirut near the home of his uncle the archeologist Henri Seyrig. In 1953, on a visit to Paris, he met the writer Pierre Jean Jouve and his wife, the psychoanalyst Blanche Reverchon. Roman would later describe this encounter as a “second birth.” The next summer he undertook analysis with Reverchon, in the course of which gave up banking to devote himself to painting; under Jouve's influence, he rejected the vogue for abstract art and devoted himself to figuration. He grew close to other artists in their circle including Alberto Giacometti, Raymond Mason, and Balthus, whose work became a source of both inspiration and anxiety. “Even now,” Roman wrote in 1987, “I would tremble if I were to show my work to Balthus.” Roman was a friend and patron of Pierre Boulez.

In 1963 he married the artist Véronique Jordan, with whom he had one son, Emmanuel Roman. The marriage ended in divorce.

Roman's landscapes were praised by the critic Martine Broda for their “disquieting strangeness … like a memory of the world before the Fall.” Many of these evoke the Engadine region, where Roman spent summers with Jouve and Reverchon. Comparing his own paintings to those of Jouve's favorites – David, Delacroix, Manet, Balthus – Roman once wrote, “There is no trace in my work of great painters, great paintings, characters, scenes, Eros and death … nor of those themes, nor of that tradition. I was not made for their continuation, or else I came to it too late.”

Roman participated, with R.B. Kitaj, Jim Dine, Sam Szafran, and David Hockney, in the 1979 “Nouvelle Subjectivité” exhibition in Brussels at the Palais de Beaux-Arts. His work is represented by Galerie Ditesheim. The Philippe Roman Chair in History and International Affairs at the London School of Economics is named in his honor.
