= Shadows of the Evening =

Play by Noel Coward

Noël Coward and Lilli Palmer in the original production, 1966

Shadows of the Evening is a short play in two scenes, which together with A Song at Twilight and Come into the Garden, Maud forms a trilogy by Noël Coward known collectively as Suite in Three Keys, all set in the same luxury suite of a Swiss hotel. Shadows of the Evening is the most serious of the three in tone and theme. It depicts the relationship of a terminally ill man with his mistress and his estranged wife.

The play was premiered in London in 1966 starring Coward, Lilli Palmer and Irene Worth. It ran in a limited season for 60 performances. It received less praise from the press than the other two pieces in the trilogy, and was omitted when they had their Broadway premieres in 1974.

== Background and first performances ==
Suite in Three Keys was planned by Coward as his theatrical swan song: "I would like to act once more before I fold my bedraggled wings." Coward's previous play, Waiting in the Wings (1960), had not been a critical success, but the climate of opinion had changed in the intervening six years, and Coward's works had undergone a period of rediscovery and re-evaluation, which Coward called "Dad's Renaissance". This had begun with a successful 1963 revival of Private Lives at the Hampstead Theatre and continued with a 1964 production of Hay Fever at the National Theatre; in that year the New Statesman called him "demonstrably the greatest living English playwright".

Coward wrote the three plays in the expectation that Margaret Leighton would be his co-star, but she vacillated for so long about accepting the roles that he cast Lilli Palmer instead. In each of the plays there are two main female parts, and Coward chose Irene Worth for the second role: "She isn't quite a star but she's a bloody good actress. … I wish one didn't always yearn for Gertie!" (Note: Gertrude Lawrence, the actress most closely associated with Coward, had died in 1952.)

Shadows of the Evening opened at the Queen's Theatre, London, on 25 April 1966 as the first half of a double-bill with the comedy Come into the Garden, Maud, the other one-act play in the trilogy. The longer A Song at Twilight was performed on its own on other evenings. All three were directed by Vivian Matalon. The trilogy ran in repertory for a limited season, ending on 30 July. There were 60 performances of Shadows of the Evening.

Coward had intended to appear in the trilogy on Broadway, but his health was deteriorating, and he was unable to do so. In 1974, a year after his death, the other two plays of the trilogy were presented on Broadway, but Shadows of the Evening was omitted, and at 2020 has not had a Broadway production.

== Roles and original cast ==
- Linda Savignac Lilli Palmer
- Felix, a waiter – Sean Barrett
- Anne Hilgar – Irene Worth
- George Hilgar – Noël Coward

== Plot ==
In a suite in a luxury hotel in Switzerland, Linda Savignac receives a visit from Anne Hilgar. They were once close friends, until Anne's husband, George, left her for Linda, seven years ago. Anne has come from London at Linda's request to discuss George's health. During a routine examination, inoperable and terminal cancer has been detected. Linda explains that George has not been told, and she wants to discuss which of them ought to break the news to him. At first their conversation is stiff, but they become more relaxed as they recall episodes from the days of their friendship. As they are laughing about one of them, George arrives and is taken aback to find his estranged wife and current partner in amicable conversation. His first thought is that one of his and Anne's children must be ill, but she reassures him, and passes off her visit as "a little jaunt".

George, who has made his doctor tell him the truth about his condition, realises that Anne and Linda have been discussing which of them is to tell him he is dying, and he tells them that he already knew. Linda, in tears, retreats to the bedroom, leaving George and Anne together. He asks if she was still in love with him when he left her; she says she was not, but cared for him deeply and misses him greatly. He says he wants to come back to her for the last months of his life.

In the second scene, later the same day, George and Linda are in evening dress, preparing to take the boat to Evian to gamble at the casino. He outlines his plans for the short time he has left: a fortnight with her in Capri, back to London to put his financial and other affairs in order, and then return to the family house with Anne. Linda is distressed at the thought of his returning to Anne, but he tells her that he loves them both in different ways. She says that the last seven years, spent with him, have been the happiest of her life, and that she will always be grateful to him. Anne arrives. The three drink champagne together. Anne suggests that she should go back to London straight away, but Linda urges her to stay. George tells them both that he intends to go on being positive about life until "that last bewildering second" before death. The sound of the hooter of the Evian steamer is heard and the three go out together to catch it.

== Critical reception ==
The Observer commented that the play and its two companions represented Coward's best writing since the Second World War. In The Guardian, Philip Hope-Wallace, who praised the other half of the double bill, was not taken with Shadows of the Evening, "a rather bland, trite, storyless sketch". J. C. Trewin in The Illustrated London News commented on the "grave sincerity" of the writing, and found the piece "unaffectedly moving". The Times called the two plays of the double bill "vigorous restatements of Mr Coward's values – loyalty, emotional honesty and stoicism in the face of the inevitable", but thought they were better addressed in Come into the Garden, Maud than in Shadows of the Evening, in which "strongly felt lines" were outweighed by "homilies".

== Notes, references and sources ==
=== Sources ===
- Coward, Noël (1994). Plays, Five. Sheridan Morley (introduction). London: Methuen. ISBN 978-0-413-51740-1.
- Day, Barry, ed. (2007). The Letters of Noël Coward. London: Methuen. ISBN 978-1-4081-0675-4.
- Hoare, Philip (1995). Noël Coward, A Biography. London: Sinclair-Stevenson. ISBN 978-1-4081-0675-4.
- Lahr, John (1982). Coward the Playwright. London: Methuen. ISBN 978-0-413-48050-7.
- Mander, Raymond; Mitchenson, Joe; Barry Day; Sheridan Morley (2000) [1957]. Theatrical Companion to Coward (second ed.). London: Oberon. ISBN 978-1-84002-054-0.
- Morley, Sheridan (1974) [1969]. A Talent to Amuse. London: Penguin. ISBN 978-0-14-003863-7.
