= Joseph Erhardy =

American sculptor

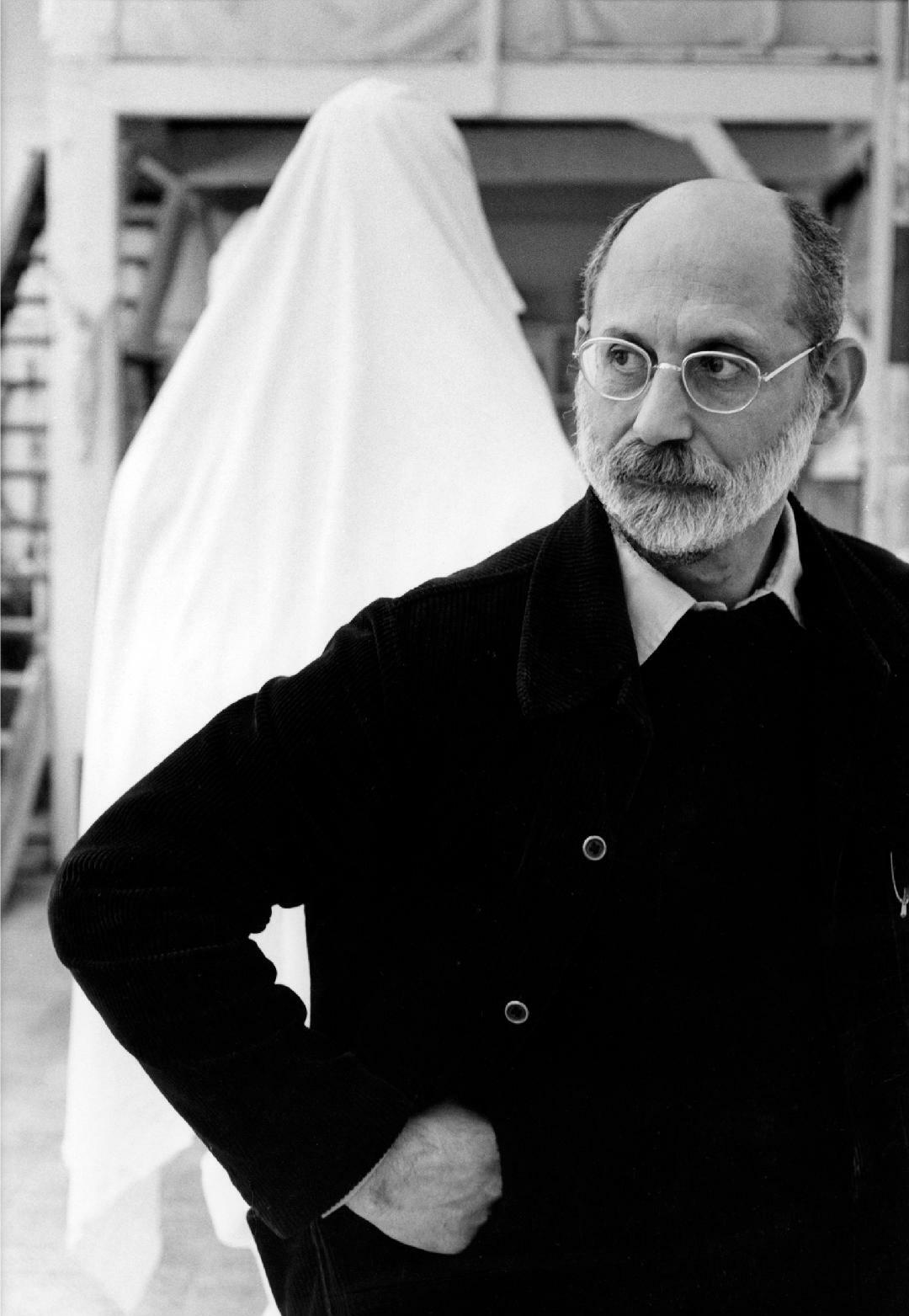
- Born: Josef Herzbrun; May 21, 1928; Welch, West Virginia
- Died: May 1, 2012 (aged 83); Paris, France
- Known for: sculptor
- Movement: Nouvelle Figuration
- Spouse: Melanie Van Muyden
- Children: Claudius, Katherine, Elisabeth, Thomas, Anne, Mary

Joseph Erhardy (1928 – May 1, 2012) was an American sculptor.

== Biography ==
Joseph Erhardy was born in Welch, West Virginia, in 1928 (as Josef Herzbrun ). In 1949, in full vogue of the American abstract movement, he left his native country and went to Florence and studied classical sculpture at the Accademia di Belle Arti. In Rome, he became the assistant of Mirko Basaldella, who was himself the assistant of Arturo Martini, much admired by Joseph Erhardy. In January 1952, he came to Paris, where he has been living ever since. After an abstract period, he returned to the figure at the end of the sixties. Artistically speaking, he feels close to an international group of friends, painters and sculptors of his generation, who have been living in Paris since the 1950s, including Sam Szafran, Raymond Mason (sculptor), Roseline Granet, Philippe Roman and Francois Jousselin, who are in line with Jean Clair, art critic and member of the French Academy.

== Museums ==
- Hirshhorn Museum and Sculpture Garden Smithsonian Institution: 7th Street & Independence Ave. SW Mail to: PO Box 37012/HMSG MRC 350 Washington, DC 20013-7012
- The National Portrait Gallery (United States) 750 Ninth St., NW, Suite 8300 Washington, DC 20560-0213 (Portrait bust of John Kenneth Galbraith)
- The Corcoran Gallery of Art 500 17th Street, NW Washington, DC 20006-4804
- The Library of Congress 101 Independence Ave, SE Washington, DC 20540 (Portrait bust of Daniel Boorstin)
- MIT Museum 265 Massachusetts Avenue, MIT Bldg N52 Cambridge, MA 02139 (Low relief of Sir Robert Jackson)
- Vatican Museum The Vatican Rome, ITALY
- Pompidou Centre/Beaubourg, Paris, FRANCE
- Downing College, University of Cambridge, UK
- Museum Beelden aan Zee, The Hague, The Netherlands

== Selected public works ==
United States

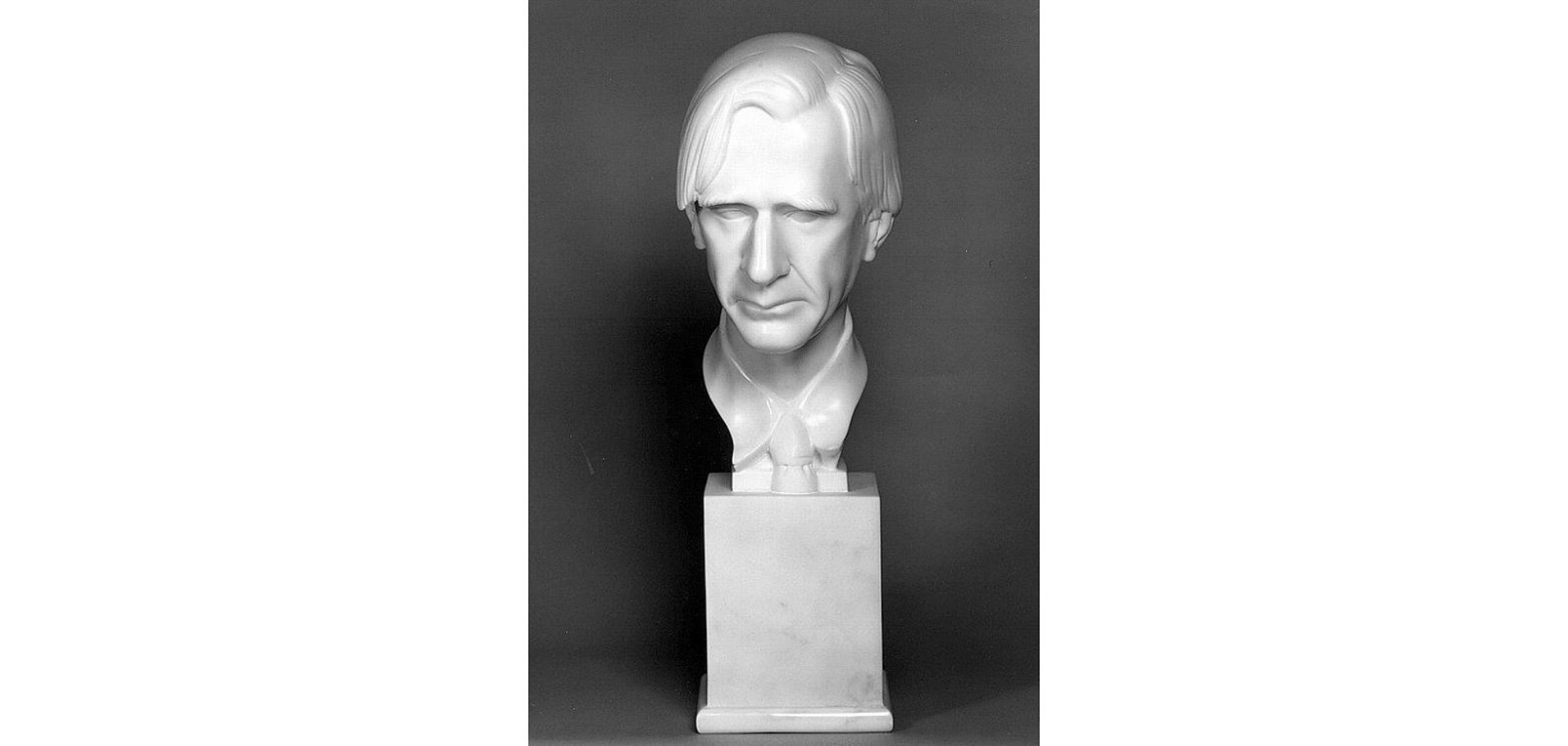
Marble portrait bust of John Kenneth Galbraith, National Portrait Gallery, Washington DC, USA

- "Warrior's Head", marble, The Corcoran Gallery of Art, Washington D.C., USA (acquired in 1962)
- "Bather" marble, "Little Flower" marble, "Little Head", marble, The Joseph H. Hishhorn Museum and Sculpture Garden, Washington D.C. (acquired in 1964)
- "John Kenneth Galbraith" marble portrait bust, The National Portrait Gallery, Washington D.C., USA (acquired in 1981)
- "Daniel Boorstin", Librarian of Congress, bronze portrait bust, The Library of Congress, Washington D.C., USA (acquired in 1983)
- "Sir Robert Jackson" low relief in bronze, Massachusetts Institute of Technology Museum, Boston, USA, (acquired in 1996)
- "Friedrich von Bischoff" bronze portrait bust, Museum of Fine Arts, Indiana University, Blooming, Indiana, USA, (acquired in 2001)

France

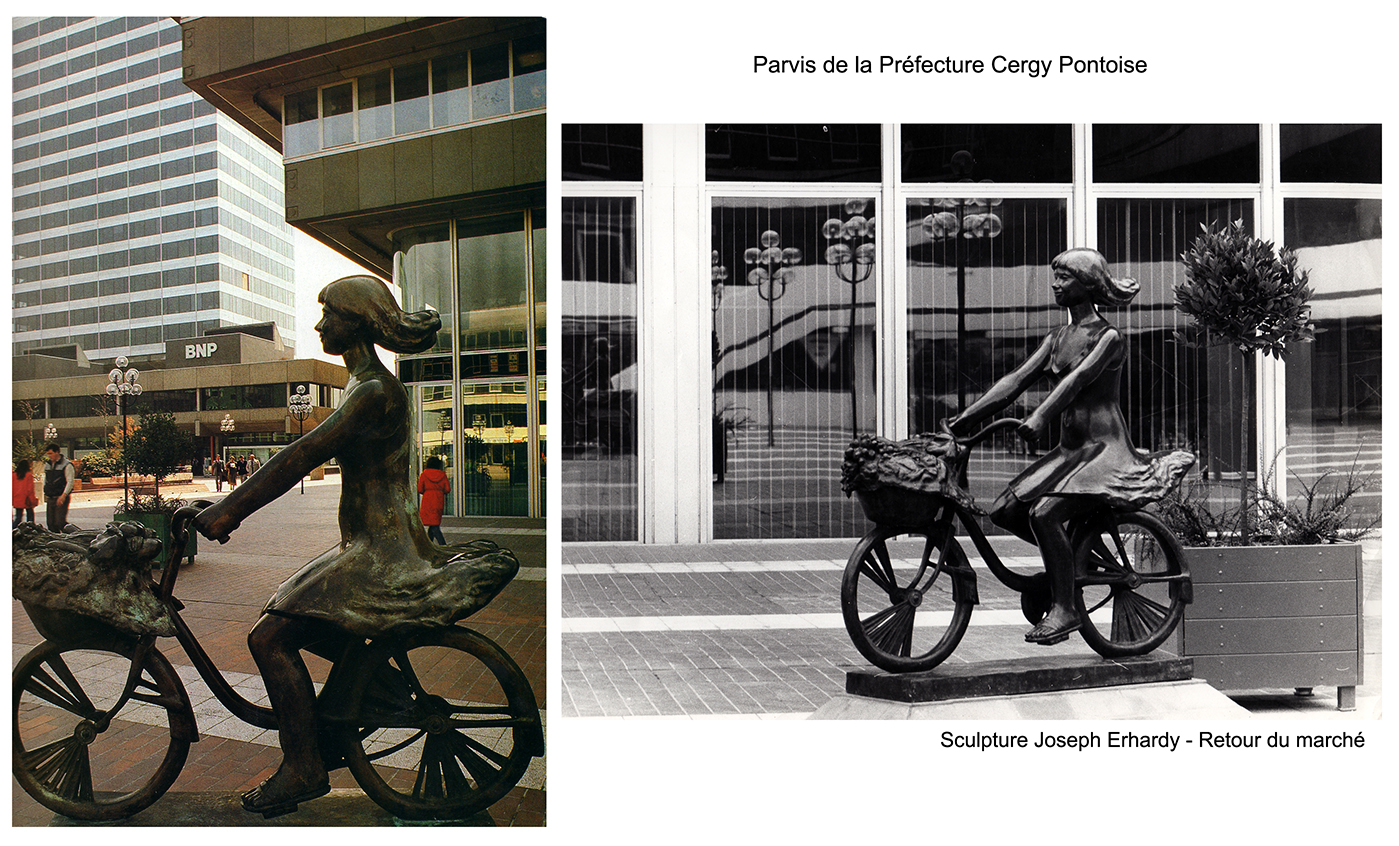
Monumental sculpture in bronze, Cergy-Pontoise, France

- "Ruth Fisher", monumental sculpture in granite- Montparnasse Cemetery (Paris) France (acquired in 1963)
- "The Sea", marble, National Museum of Modern Art, Paris, France, (acquired in 1969)
- "Crucifix", bronze, Saint Front Cathedral - Périgueux (Dordogne) (acquired in 1978)
- "Waiting", bronze, The Georges Pompidou Center (Paris) France (acquired in 1979)
- "Coming Home from Market", bronze, Prefectural Square of Cergy Pontoise (Val d'Oise), France (acquired in 1981)
- "Raymond Aron", portrait bust in marble, Foundation of French Judaism, Paris, France (acquired in 1983)
- "Jean Corvisart", monumental memorial bust in terra-cotta, Roubaix Hospital, France (acquired in 1983)
- "Épée d'Académicien" (academic sword), presented to Fernand Braudel upon his election to the French Academy in 1985
- "Madame Borochovitch", memorial portrait bust in bronze, Museum of the French Resistance Mouvement, Nantua (Ain), France (acquired in 1991)

Great-Britain

- "Nude with Drape", bronze (1957), "Girl with hair in a bun", marble (1961), "Little Girl" marble (1961), "Asleep" marble (1964), "Strife" marble (1965), "Curved" marble (1966), "Girl with an apple" marble (1970), "Motherhood" marble (1970), Downing College, University of Cambridge, Great Britain (acquired between 1961 and 1970)

Italy

- "Crucifix" bronze, The Vatican, Rome, Italy (acquired in 1979)

Netherlands

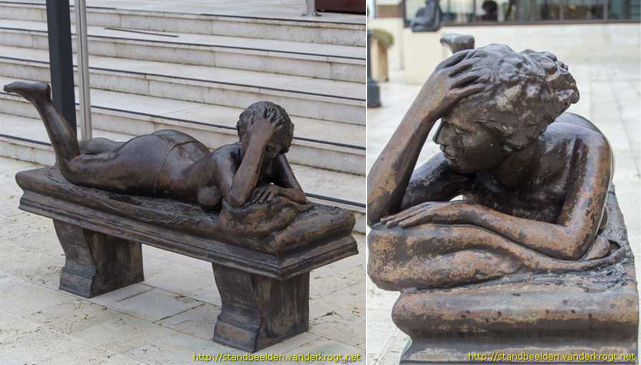
Monumental sculpture in bronze, The Hague, the Netherlands

- "Double Sculpture" monumental sculpture in stone with marble inlay, "Crucifix" bronze, Catherina Hospital, Eindhoven (acquired in 1972)
- "Summer in the Tuileries Gardens" monumental sculpture in bronze, Beelden aan Zee, Museum Scheveningen, The Hague (acquired in 1998)

== Sources ==
- Who's Who in France
- 2005 Dunbier, Lonnie Pierson (Ed) The Artists Bluebook: 34,000 North American Artists to March 2005
- 2005 Davenport, Ray Davenport's Art Reference: The Gold Edition
