= Come Into the Garden, Maud =

Come Into the Garden, Maud may refer to:

- Come into the garden, Maud, a line from the poem Maud by Alfred, Lord Tennyson
- Come Into the Garden, Maud (play), a comedy play by Noël Coward
- Come Into the Garden, Maud (song), a song by Michael William Balfe
