= Come Into the Garden, Maud (play) =

Play by Noël Coward

Verner Conklin (Noël Coward) and Maud Caragnani (Lilli Palmer), 1966

Come Into the Garden, Maud is a comedy, one of the trilogy of plays by Noël Coward known collectively as Suite in Three Keys. The other two, A Song at Twilight and Shadows of the Evening are more serious in tone. All three plays are set in the same suite in a luxury hotel in Switzerland.

The play depicts a middle-aged American couple. The wife is querulous and domineering, the husband philosophical. He finds comfort in the kindness of a widow they have recently met, and at the end of the play he leaves his wife for her. The play debuted in London's West End in 1966, starring Coward, and was performed on Broadway in 1974.

== Background and first performances ==
Suite in Three Keys was planned by Coward as his theatrical swan song: "I would like to act once more before I fold my bedraggled wings." Coward's previous play, Waiting in the Wings (1960), had not been a critical success, but the climate of opinion had changed in the intervening six years, and Coward's works had undergone a period of rediscovery and re-evaluation, which Coward called "Dad's Renaissance". This had begun with a successful 1963 revival of Private Lives at the Hampstead Theatre and continued with a 1964 production of Hay Fever at the National Theatre; in that year The New Statesman called him "demonstrably the greatest living English playwright".

Coward wrote the three plays in the expectation that Margaret Leighton would be his co-star, but she vacillated for so long about accepting the roles that he cast Lilli Palmer instead. In each of the plays there are two main female parts, and Coward chose Irene Worth for the second role: "She isn't quite a star but she's a bloody good actress. … I wish one didn't always yearn for Gertie!" (Note: Gertrude Lawrence, the actress most closely associated with Coward, had died in 1952.)

Come Into the Garden, Maud opened at the Queen's Theatre, London, on 25 April 1966 as the second half of a double-bill with Shadows of the Evening. Both were directed by Vivian Matalon. The trilogy ran in repertory for a limited season, ending on 30 July. There were 60 performances of Come Into the Garden, Maud.

Coward had intended to appear in the trilogy on Broadway, but his health was deteriorating, and he was unable to do so. In 1974, a year after his death, Come Into the Garden, Maud and A Song at Twilight were presented in a double-bill, featuring Hume Cronyn, Jessica Tandy and Anne Baxter. After a ten-week tour the production opened at the Ethel Barrymore Theatre, New York, where it ran for 140 performances.

== Roles and original casts ==
	London	New York
Anne-Mary Conklin	Irene Worth	Jessica Tandy
Felix, a waiter	Sean Barrett	Thom Christopher
Verner Conklin	Noël Coward	Hume Cronyn
Maud Caragnani	Lilli Palmer	Anne Baxter

== Plot ==
=== Scene 1 ===
The Conklins, a wealthy American couple, are staying in the grand Lausanne Hotel. Anne-Mary is petulant and domineering; Verner is quiet and philosophical. She is finalising arrangements for a grand dinner party she is to give in the hotel's restaurant that evening with a prince as guest of honour. Maud Caragnani, the English widow of an Italian prince, pays them a visit. The three met for the first time in Rome quite recently. Verner took to her; Anne-Mary did not. When one of the dinner guests rings to cancel because of illness, Anne-Mary is horrified: there would be thirteen at the table. She tells Verner he will have to eat his dinner in the suite rather than in the restaurant. He is not excessively distressed.

=== Scene 2 ===
That evening Verner is relaxing after dining in the suite. He asks the waiter, Felix, about Maud. Felix tells him that she is "an enchanting lady of whom everyone is fond". After Felix has gone, the telephone rings. Maud, from the hotel lobby, asks if she may come up. When she arrives she and Verner have a friendly conversation, and it becomes clear that they are strongly drawn to each other. When Maud suggests they might meet later in Rome, Verner tells her "I am coming with you this very night". He convinces her that he is in earnest and means to marry her. She insists that they must both be free to see how things turn out. She leaves, with a promise to pick him up at 12.30 in her car. Anne-Mary returns in a bad temper from the dinner party, which has not gone as well as she hoped. Verner pretends to be asleep, but she insists on waking him to complain about her guests. To annoy her, Verner pretends to be drunk. She demands that he leave her alone. As he goes out, Verner replies, "Okay, that's exactly what I intend to do. Goodnight, sweetheart!"

== Critical reception ==
Coward wrote in his diary, "Maud was an absolute riot from beginning to end, and the ovation at the final curtain was quite, quite wonderful." The Times said, "Situation and characters alike are good solid stereotypes, but they still have plenty of life in them". In The Guardian, Philip Hope-Wallace thought the play "a loud and impenitent comedy … a lot of fun". The London correspondent of the New York Sunday News thought Coward "witty, amusing and brilliant". The Observer commented that the play and its two companions represented Coward's best writing since the Second World War; Coward's message was that love, courage and consideration can prevent other people from being Hell. In Punch, Jeremy Kingston thought the double bill of poorer quality than A Song a Twilight, but "the jokes are frequent and the end is skilfully worked out".

When the play opened on Broadway, The Daily News thought it "so old-fashioned it might have been written 40 years ago – but it plays". In The Los Angeles Times, Dan Sullivan called for "pink champagne. … There is nothing major about this show. … It will not change anybody's life. It provides only what used to be called 'a pleasant evening in the theater', the stage equivalent of a good read".

== Notes, references and sources ==
=== Sources ===
- Coward, Noël (1994). Plays, Five. Sheridan Morley (introduction). London: Methuen. ISBN 978-0-413-51740-1.
- Day, Barry, ed. (2007). The Letters of Noël Coward. London: Methuen. ISBN 978-1-4081-0675-4.
- Hoare, Philip (1995). Noël Coward, A Biography. London: Sinclair-Stevenson. ISBN 978-1-4081-0675-4.
- Lahr, John (1982). Coward the Playwright. London: Methuen. ISBN 978-0-413-48050-7.
- Mander, Raymond; Mitchenson, Joe; Barry Day; Sheridan Morley (2000) [1957]. Theatrical Companion to Coward (second ed.). London: Oberon. ISBN 978-1-84002-054-0.
- Morley, Sheridan (1974) [1969]. A Talent to Amuse. London: Penguin. ISBN 978-0-14-003863-7.
