= Colonel Markesan and Less Pleasant People =

1966 book by August Derleth and Mark Schorer

- Dust jacket illustration by Frank Utpatel.
- Author: August Derleth and Mark Schorer
- Cover artist: Frank Utpatel
- Language: English
- Genre: Fantasy, horror
- Publisher: Arkham House
- Publication date: 1966
- Publication place: United States
- Media type: Print (hardback)
- Pages: 285

Colonel Markesan and Less Pleasant People is a collection of stories by American authors August Derleth and Mark Schorer writing in collaboration. It was released in 1966 by Arkham House in an edition of 2,405 copies. The stories were written while the two authors shared a cabin on the Wisconsin River in Sauk City during the summer of 1931. Most of the stories were published in the magazine Weird Tales. Two of the stories, "Colonel Markesan" and "The Return of Andrew Bentley", were adapted for the Thriller television series.

== Contents ==
Colonel Markesan and Less Pleasant People contains the following tales:

- "In the Left Wing"
- "Spawn of the Maelstrom"
- "The Carven Image"
- "The Pacer"
- "The Lair of the Star-Spawn"
- "Colonel Markesan"
- "The Return of Andrew Bentley"
- "The Woman at Loon Point"
- "Death Holds the Post"
- "Laughter in the Night"
- "The Vengeance of Aï"
- "Red Hands"
- "They Shall Rise"
- "Eyes of the Serpent"
- "The Horror from the Depths"
- "The Occupant of the Crypt"
- "The House in the Magnolias"

== Sources ==
- Jaffery, Sheldon (1989). The Arkham House Companion. Mercer Island, WA: Starmont House, Inc. p. 83. ISBN 1-55742-005-X.
- Chalker, Jack L.; Mark Owings (1998). The Science-Fantasy Publishers: A Bibliographic History, 1923-1998. Westminster, MD and Baltimore: Mirage Press, Ltd. p. 44.
- Joshi, S.T. (1999). Sixty Years of Arkham House: A History and Bibliography. Sauk City, WI: Arkham House. p. 96. ISBN 0-87054-176-5.
- Nielsen, Leon (2004). Arkham House Books: A Collector's Guide. Jefferson, NC and London: McFarland & Company, Inc. p. 98. ISBN 0-7864-1785-4.
