= Suite in Three Keys =

Cover of 1966 edition of the trilogy

Suite in Three Keys is a trilogy of plays by Noël Coward. It comprises two short plays – Shadows of the Evening and Come Into the Garden, Maud – designed to be given as a double bill, and a stand-alone full-length play, A Song at Twilight. They are all set in the same suite in a luxury Swiss hotel and have a single character common to all three: the Italian waiter. The other characters are British, American and German hotel guests or visitors.

The trilogy was first presented in London in 1966, starring Coward, Lilli Palmer and Irene Worth.

== Background and first performances ==
Suite in Three Keys was planned by Coward as his theatrical swan song: "I would like to act once more before I fold my bedraggled wings." He wrote the three plays in the expectation that Margaret Leighton would be his co-star, but she vacillated for so long about accepting the roles that he cast Lilli Palmer instead. In each of the plays there are two main female parts, and Coward chose Irene Worth for the second role. The only character common to all three plays, Felix, the young Italian waiter, was played by Sean Barrett. The other characters, nine in all, are English, American or German guests or visitors at the hotel, played by Coward, Palmer and Worth.

The trilogy comprises:

- A Song at Twilight (premiered 14 April 1966)
- A double bill (premiered 25 April 1966):

- Shadows of the Evening, and
- Come Into the Garden, Maud

They originally ran in repertory for a limited season ending on 30 July 1966. All were directed by Vivian Matalon. There were 64 performances of A Song at Twilight and 60 of the double bill.

Coward had intended to appear in the trilogy on Broadway, but his health was deteriorating, and he was unable to do so. In 1974, a year after his death, A Song at Twilight and Come Into the Garden Maud were presented on Broadway as Noël Coward in Two Keys; Shadows of the Evening was omitted, and at 2020 has not had a Broadway production.

== References and sources ==
=== Sources ===
- Coward, Noël (1994). Plays, Five. Sheridan Morley (introduction). London: Methuen. ISBN 978-0-413-51740-1.
- Day, Barry, ed. (2007). The Letters of Noël Coward. London: Methuen. ISBN 978-1-4081-0675-4.
- Hoare, Philip (1995). Noël Coward, A Biography. London: Sinclair-Stevenson. ISBN 978-1-4081-0675-4.
- Mander, Raymond; Mitchenson, Joe; Barry Day; Sheridan Morley (2000) [1957]. Theatrical Companion to Coward (second ed.). London: Oberon. ISBN 978-1-84002-054-0.
