= Henry Bauchau =

Belgium psychoanalyst, writer (1913–2012)

- Born: 22 January 1913; Mechelen, Belgium
- Died: 21 September 2012 (aged 99); Paris, France
- Occupations: Author, psychoanalysist, political activist
- Spouse: Mary Kozyrev (1910-1984)
- Children: Patrick Bauchau

Henry Bauchau (22 January 1913 – 21 September 2012) was a Belgian political activist and psychoanalyst who is best known as an author of poetry, novels, and plays in French language.

== Biography ==
=== Early life and political activities ===
Henry Bauchau was born in Mechelen, Belgium on 22 January 1913 in a French-speaking family of the Catholic bourgeoisie. He studied law at the Catholic University of Leuven between 1932 and 1939 and became a regular writer for the influential Christian Democrat periodical La Cité Chrétienne. He was also involved in the Action catholique de la jeunesse belge (ACJB). Although ideologically opposed to Nazism, Bauchau was inspired by the communitarian and youth movements established over the same period in Nazi Germany.

As a reserve officer, Bauchau was called at the outbreak of World War II and served in the Belgian Army during the German invasion of Belgium in May 1940. He was "profoundly humiliated" by the rapid defeat and embraced the call from King Leopold III to assist in national reconstruction under the German occupation. In this end, he helped to establish a small volunteer labour battalion in September 1940 which became known as the Service des Volontaires du Travail pour la Wallonie (SVTW). The movement was inspired by Christian youth organisations and was ideologically royalist and patriotic. In spite of this, it was widely seen as a collaborationist movement and popularly associated with the Rexist Party.

Opposed to the influx of Rexists into the movement, Bauchau left the SVTW in June 1943 and became part of the Belgian Resistance. He joined a group in hiding in the Ardennes and later fled to the United Kingdom.

=== Literary career ===
After Belgium's Liberation, Bauchau's wartime activities led to him being stigmatised as a collaborator. He emigrated to Switzerland where he began to focus as a writer after undergoing psychoanalysis with the French analyst Blanche Reverchon.

Profoundly influenced by his experience of psychoanalysis, Bauchau's first collections of poetry was published as Géologie (1958). He subsequently wrote a number of well-received poetry editions, plays, and novels which he combined with his work as the director of a Swiss international college. He moved to Paris in France in 1973 and continued to publish a number of works while devoting himself increasingly to psychoanalysis. He was a friend of Albert Camus, André Gide, Jacques Lacan, and Jacques Derrida.

After 1990, Bauchau's literary work received increasing recognition. He was admitted to the Académie royale de langue et de littérature françaises de Belgique in 1991 and won the Prix Victor-Rossel for Antigone (1997). He remained active until his death on 21 September 2012.

Bauchau married Mary Kozyrev in 1936. Their son is the actor Patrick Bauchau.

== Awards ==
- 1990 Royal Academy of Belgian Literature
- 2002 International Latin Union prize of Romance Language Literatures

== Works ==
- Géologie (1958; "Geology"), 1958
- Gengis Khan, Mermod, 1960 (reprint Actes sud, 1989)
- La Machination (1969; "The Plot"), (play)
- Œdipe sur la route, Actes Sud, 1990, ISBN 978-2-86869-510-9
  - Oedipus on the Road. Translated by Anne-Marie Glasheen. Arcade Publishing. 1997. ISBN 978-1-55970-382-6.
- La Chine intérieure (1974; "Inner China") (poems)
- Essai sur la vie de Mao Tsé-toung, Flammarion, 1982, ISBN 2080642235
- Poésie: 1950-1984, Actes Sud, 1986
- Le régiment noir, Éperonniers, 1987
- Diotime et les lions: récit, Actes Sud, 1991, ISBN 978-2-86869-691-5
- L'écriture et la circonstance, Presses universitaires de Louvain, UCL, 1992
- Antigone: roman, Actes Sud, 1997, ISBN 978-2-7427-1724-8
- La déchirure (English: The Tear), Editions Labor, 1998, ISBN 978-2-8040-1337-0
- Journal d'Antigone: 1989-1997, Actes Sud, 1999
- L'enfant bleu: roman, Actes sud, 2004, ISBN 978-2-7427-5139-6
- Le boulevard périphérique: roman, Actes sud, 2008, ISBN 978-2-7427-7169-1
- Déluge, Actes sud, 2010, ISBN 978-2-7427-8989-4

== See also ==
- Raymond De Becker - a Belgian writer and wartime collaborator, also a friend of Bauchau's.

== Bibliography ==
- Surmonte, Emilia, Antigone, La Sphinx d'Henry Bauchau: Les enjeux d'une création (Bruxelles etc., Peter Lang, 2011) (Documents pour l'Histoire des Francophonies. Europe, 24).
