= Pierre Jean Jouve =

French writer, novelist and poet

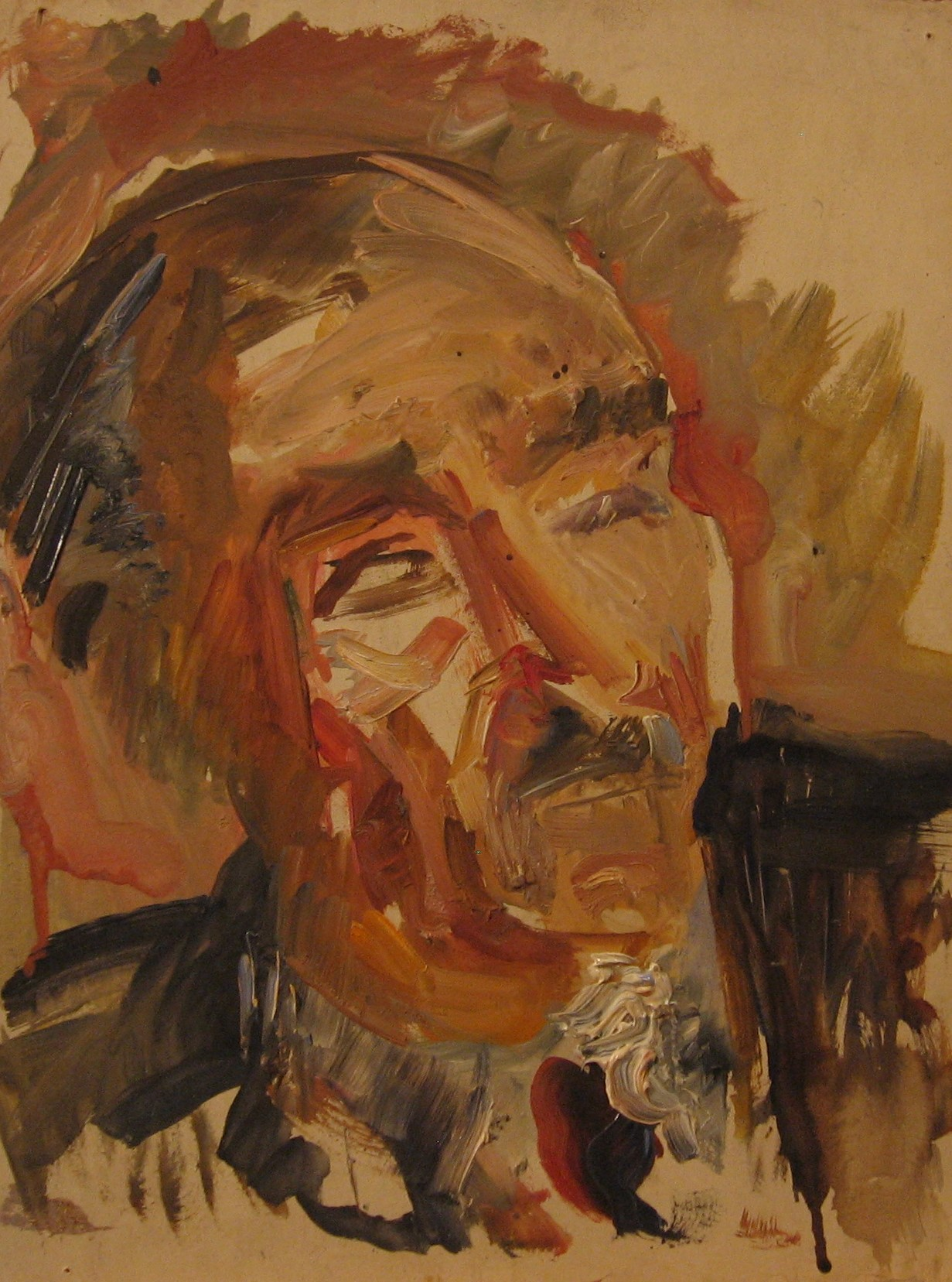
- Portrait of Pierre Jean Jouve by Claire Bertrand.
- Born: 11 October 1887
- Died: 8 January 1976 (aged 88)

Pierre Jean Jouve (French pronunciation: [pjɛʁ ʒɑ̃ ʒuv]; 11 October 1887 – 8 January 1976) was a French writer, novelist and poet. He was nominated for the Nobel Prize in Literature five times. In 1966 he was awarded the Grand Prix de Poésie by the French Academy.

Born and raised in Arras, as a teenager Jouve read Rimbaud, Mallarmé, and Baudelaire and began to write poetry of his own. In 1906, he and his sister Madeleine, together with their close family friends the Charpentiers, founded the literary magazine Le Bandeau d'Or. At that time, Jouve drew close to the Abbaye de Créteil, a literary and utopian movement based outside Paris. In 1910 he married Andrée Charpentier, and the couple moved to Poitiers, where Andrée took a position as a teacher and Pierre sold player pianos. During World War One he served as an orderly in the hospital at Poitiers. A militant pacifist, in 1915 he and Andrée left France for Switzerland, where he became close to the novelist Romain Rolland and continued to serve as an orderly.

In the 1920s, Jouve fell in love with Blanche Reverchon, a psychiatrist and the first translator of Sigmund Freud's work into French; later, at Freud's urging, she established her own practice as a psychoanalyst in Paris.. She and Jouve were married in 1925. In 1928, after undergoing analysis himself, Jouve renounced all of his previously published work. His subsequent writing was heavily influenced by his reading of Freud and deeply engaged with themes of sexuality and guilt. In later life, he and Blanche were at the center of a circle of writers and artists that included Balthus, Philippe Roman, David Gascoyne, and Henry Bauchaud. Vociferously anti-fascist, Jouve was along with Louis Aragon one of the chief poets of the French resistance.

== Works ==
=== Original works in French (selection) ===
- Paulina 1880, 1925
- Le Monde désert, 1927
- Vagadu, 1931
- Noces, 1931
- Sueur de sang, 1935
- Matière céleste, 1937
- La Vierge de Paris, 1946
- Tombeau de Baudelaire, 1958

=== Works translated into English ===
- An Idiom of Night, selected and translated by Keith Bosley (Swallow Press 1968)
- Hélène, trans. Lydia Davis (Marlboro Press 1995; 1936)
- Paulina 1880, trans. Rosette Letellier and Robert Bullen (Marlboro Press 1995; 1925)
- The Desert World, trans. Lydia Davis (Marlboro Press 1996; 1927)
- Hecate: The Adventure of Catherine Crachat: I, trans. Lydia Davis (Marlboro Press 1997; 1928)
- Despair Has Wings: Selected Poems, trans. David Gascoyne, ed. Roger Scott (Initharmon Press 2007)
