= Les Belles Images =

1966 novel by Simone de Beauvoir

- Author: Simone de Beauvoir
- Genre: Feminist fiction
- Publication date: 1966
- Pages: 183

Les Belles Images (lit. 'The Beautiful Images') is a French novel by the philosopher, essayist and feminist novelist Simone de Beauvoir published in 1966. The novel takes as its main theme the problematization of social roles and stereotypical images of bourgeois women during the 1960s through the awareness of the main character, Laurence.

== Presentation ==
The novel depicts the growing awareness of the narrator, Laurence. While juggling the roles of mother, devoted wife, lover, daughter of aging parents, and her professional life, Laurence tries to define herself in relation to these predetermined societal images, which are sometimes divergent and problematic. Throughout the novel, Laurence asks herself: "What do others have that I don't?"

Laurence is an accomplished woman, leading a glamorous life in Paris. In her thirties, she married young to a forward-thinking architect, has two daughters, and an interesting career in advertising. Her profession and her life experiences have taught her to decode messages, to see through deceptive appearances, and to scrutinize social mores. Throughout the novel, she realizes that her life doesn't suit her: she finds it cold and empty, much like the slogans she creates at work. She takes a lover, but once the initial passion fades, the experience fails to lift her out of boredom. Her upbringing seems to be the source of her woes: it taught her to build her life on appearances, at the expense of her personality and personal growth. Laurence understands the limitations of her upbringing through her sister Marthe, who loses herself in religion, and her mother Dominique, dumped at 51 and ready to do anything to avoid loneliness, all while trying to emulate the image of the successful, independent woman. Meanwhile, her eldest daughter, Catherine, is growing up and opening her eyes to the world. She, too, is being taught to suppress her emotions and her quest to answer the difficult questions she asks herself about her place in the universe. Laurence cannot bear the thought of her daughter becoming the insensitive woman she herself has become. Overwhelmed by anxiety, she can no longer eat and becomes ill. It is ultimately in the name of maintaining the family's equilibrium that Laurence manages to secure a chance for her children to be different.

The novel is among Beauvoir's lesser-known works, but it remains an important text nonetheless, offering a focused glimpse into the situation of a woman of her time. Laurence's quest is universal, as the story of a woman seeking to feel at ease amidst the conflicting images of what constitutes a fulfilled woman remains ever relevant.

== Characters ==
- Laurence: main character, narrative voice
- Jean-Charles: Laurence's husband, a modern architect
- Vergne: Jean-Charles' colleague and head of the firm
- Lucien: Laurence's lover and colleague at Publinf
- Catherine: Laurence's eldest daughter, distressed by the world's troubles
- Brigitte: Catherine's girlfriend, precocious
- Louise: Laurence's youngest daughter
- Dominique Langlois: Laurence's mother
- Gilbert Mortier: partner of Dominique, millionaire
- Marie-Claire: Gilbert's wife who refuses the divorce
- Patricia: the daughter of Lucile de Saint-Chamont, with whom Gilbert falls in love
- Lucile de Saint-Chamont: Gilbert's former lover, Patricia's mother
- Marthe: Laurence's sister, a nun
- Hubert: Marthe's husband, Laurence's brother-in-law
- Dad: Laurence's father, a reclusive intellectual
- Serge: Dad's nephew who is looking for a job
- Gisèle and Mr. Dufrène: friends of the family
- The Thirions: friends of the family
- Mona: friend and colleague of Laurence at Publinf
- Miss Houchet: Laurence's childhood teacher who appears in her thoughts
- Goya: Laurence's servant
- Ms. Frossard: Catherine's psychologist

== Literary style ==
=== Narrative focus ===
Les Belles Images is told from the perspective of the protagonist Laurence. The narrative voice oscillates between the depiction of events experienced by Laurence and the depiction of her internal dialogue, which often interrupts the flow of the narrative as she interacts with her lived experiences. The narration is therefore in free indirect style, where the character's actions and thoughts are marked by the interchangeability of pronouns, adverbs, tense, and mood. This narrative style allows readers to move, or even oscillate, between the direct narration of the events as perceived by Laurence and the indirect representation of her thoughts and events outside the present, which infiltrate the consciousness of the narrating character.

In the text, these interruptions in the flow of the third-person narration, seen from Laurence's perspective, are often marked by parentheses, dashes, or the otherwise unconventional use of the first-person singular, inserted directly into the middle of sentences and paragraphs. Sometimes, the use of the pronoun and the context are the only clues to readers that this is a shift in narrative focalization. For example:

"Aimer d'amour", dit papa. Est-ce que j'aime Jean-Charles – ai-je aimé Lucien – d'amour ? Elle a l'impression que les gens lui sont juxtaposés, ils n'habitent pas en elle ; sauf ses filles, mais ça doit être organique" (67)

The dialogue between characters undergoes a similar effect when certain sentences are filtered and retold by Laurence, indicated by the absence of dashes, while there are other instances where the characters speak for themselves. This type of dialogue is indicated by the use of conventional mode. The character's focalization and the use of free indirect discourse create the narratological illusion that we have access to Laurence's internal perspective in real time.

=== Time ===
The novel's chronology follows the conventions of time, apart from a few more obvious interruptions in chapter 4, where Laurence seems to be narrating her earlier trip to Greece with her father, taken when she was ill during a psychological crisis. The temporal ellipsis is marked by several breaks, interruptions by Marthe (156 and 168) and again by Jean-Charles (169 and 180), before the narrative returns to the present of the sequence of events, which concludes the novel.

=== Problematic heroine ===
In a letter written in 1969, Simone de Beauvoir observed: "There is a ‘problematic heroine’ in the novel—like Madame Bovary, for example—and it is Laurence, a poor, lost soul, who, with her meager resources, discovers the society in which she lives". Beauvoir had explicitly intended Laurence to be a positive problematic heroine, despite the unfavorable reception this choice sometimes generated (103) . In her memoirs, Tout compte fait, Beauvoir notes that: "above all, I do not feel obliged to choose exemplary heroines. To describe failure, error, bad faith, is, it seems to me, to betray no one". The characters in the novel, and especially the heroine, Laurence, are expressly not exemplary archetypes, but rather representations of real people.

The search for authentic values in a degraded world is a novelistic trope that comes from concerns related to sociological criticism and seems to replace the archetype of the traditional hero to meet the demands of our modern and conformist consumer society.

== Summary ==
=== Chapter 1 ===
Laurence and her family are spending a pleasant weekend at Feuverolles, the country house of her mother Dominique and her millionaire partner, Gilbert. The scene is, according to Laurence, "the perfect image reproduced by Plaisir de France and Votre Maison " (7). Her sister, nicknamed Sainte Marthe, is looking after the children. Jean-Charles, Gilbert, Hubert, and the Dufrènes discuss high-fidelity stereos, planned trips to Balbek (10) and their jobs, and also images of the utopian metropolis of the future. Laurence remains quiet, focused on her observations, before being invited to join her mother in her room. We learn that Dominique and her daughter have a close relationship. Together they look at Dominique's reflection in the mirror. Despite the image of a 51-year-old woman aging well, Dominique fears old age, and the refusal of Gilbert's ex-wife, Marie-Claire, to grant him a divorce to upset him; She feels diminished because of her near-dependence on her partner in social matters. Her mother is an enigma and a stranger to Laurence (11).

Back in Paris, Laurence throws herself into her work, searching for a slogan to sell wooden panels (21). She is interrupted by her eldest daughter, Catherine, who is bewildered by the question, "Why do we exist?" (26) Laurence tries to answer in a way that will satisfy her daughter and begins to worry about her children's emotional state. The next day at work, Laurence is still worried about Catherine and thinks about her husband, Jean-Charles, and also about her lover and colleague, Lucien, who is demanding more and more of her attention, despite the annoyance this causes her. That evening, she goes to her father's house to ask his opinion about Catherine. Laurence sees her father as a kind of wise man who lives according to his humanitarian principles despite social demands. He is a solitary man, and the love of her life (33). Laurence's father agrees to help Catherine during a visit to their home. There is a disagreement between Jean-Charles and Laurence regarding Catherine: "For him, the inside is not as important as the outside and Laurence begins to understand that if the individual loses his empathy, it is society's fault" (40).

=== Chapter 2 ===
The second chapter opens with a phone call from Gilbert and a plea for Laurence to come and speak to him about Dominique. Gilbert announces that he has fallen in love with a nineteen-year-old girl, Patricia, who is also the daughter of a former lover, Lucile de Saint-Chamont. His wife finally agrees to a divorce on the condition that he marry Patricia (and not Dominique). Laurence is stunned by this pronouncement and refuses to cooperate with Gilbert when he asks her to relieve his mother's distress. The next day, she stops by Dominique's apartment. Dominique is distraught by Gilbert's decision and plots to get revenge. Dominique feels deceived and consumed by despair. She pitifully declares that "at fifty-one, you don't start your life over" (51). Laurence is surprised, even disgusted, by her mother's theatrical rage. Despite her pleas, Laurence returns home worried about her mother and convinced that she will look for a reckless way to take revenge on Gilbert.

Laurence finds Catherine's friend Brigitte at her home and realizes that it is probably this friendship with a precocious girl that is the instigator of her daughter's troubles. Yet, she is charmed by Brigitte and remembers how important friendship (or for Laurence, the absence of a childhood friendship) is in the development of young girls (56–57).

The following evening, Laurence finds herself in the apartment of Lucien, her lover, where she contemplates her situation, comparing it to Jean-Charles and her life outside their intimate relationship. Lucien is becoming increasingly sentimental and concerned about his future with Laurence. He renews his pleas that Laurence allow herself to offer him more than just crumbs of her life (76), and she observes that the initial passion between them has faded. Later, observing her husband, Laurence wonders, "Why Jean-Charles rather than Lucien?" (65). She concludes that everything in her life happened by chance, yet she has no regrets (66–67). Her colleague Mona comes to work at her apartment, and the two women discuss Laurence's situation for a while. Then, her sister Marthe arrives unexpectedly to convince Laurence to send Catherine to catechism and "have her receive her First Communion" (75). In despair, Laurence confides to Marthe that Catherine is questioning her own existence a great deal, and Marthe suggests that this instability is the result of the girl's lack of religion. Laurence abruptly rejects this opinion and instead asks Brigitte to stop telling Catherine the sad news stories.

=== Chapter 3 ===
Laurence continues to ponder Catherine's situation and tries unsuccessfully to gather her own opinions. She regurgitates other people's philosophies, compares them, comments on them, without ever drawing her own conclusion. Jean-Charles seems increasingly unpleasant and agitated due to the difficulties he's experiencing at work, so Laurence offers to drive them when they leave together to spend the weekend back in Feuverolles. Since meeting Gilbert, Laurence had hesitated to share the identity of Gilbert's lover with her mother. Upon arriving in the countryside, it's clear that Dominique has misunderstood the situation: she's convinced that Gilbert will rekindle his old flame, Lucile de Saint-Chamont, and doesn't yet know that Lucile is actually her daughter, Patricia. Dominique still dreams of revenge and devises a plan to take Lucile from him. In the living room, there's a friendly discussion about future technology with Mr. and Mrs. Thirion and the Dufrènes, before Gilbert intervenes to ask Laurence to take responsibility for informing Dominique about Patricia (96–97). Laurence feels trapped in a difficult position but still resists telling the truth. Gilbert leaves abruptly, and the exchange of intellectual ideas continues much as before, despite Laurence's silence and inner turmoil.

Then there is an ellipsis that skips over the details of a car accident, which Laurence recounts earlier (101). It is the repression of a traumatic situation: Laurence swerved to avoid a young cyclist whom she would otherwise have hit. She believes she reacted correctly, but Jean-Charles is convinced otherwise—he regrets that the car was wrecked instead of the cyclist, and this worsens his bad mood. It is his father who arrives to encourage Laurence the next day. Through their conversation, Laurence realizes that she must "declutter [her] life" and end things with Lucien (107), and she decides to go out with him that very evening to do so. Her conversation with Lucien (110) resumes in the same tone and in the same terms, paralleling Gilbert's argument. Laurence returns home free and without regrets.

At work, her conversations with Lucien are tense, but Laurence has to abruptly excuse herself to join her mother, who has just learned the truth about Gilbert. Furious, she eagerly resumes her plot to ruin Gilbert's marriage by writing a letter to Patricia informing her that her mother is her fiancé's former lover. Laurence begs her to resist the revenge, but learns the next day that Dominique has carried out her plan. Arriving at her mother's house again, Laurence discovers that Gilbert came before her to assault and humiliate Dominique after seeing the letter Patricia had read. The two women go outside together to catch their breath, but Dominique seems distraught and broken.

Laurence's situation is becoming increasingly complicated: Catherine has just submitted a report card with mediocre grades, which infuriates Jean-Charles, who subsequently decides to send Catherine to a psychologist to determine the cause of her difficulties. Laurence opposes the idea but eventually gives in to Jean-Charles's demands to maintain peace at home. Jean-Charles accuses Laurence of being too sensitive and observes that Catherine is modeling herself after her. He insists that they should try to intervene in Catherine and Brigitte's friendship to prevent Catherine's situation from worsening. To make up for their misunderstanding, Jean-Charles buys Laurence an extravagant set of jewelry and Catherine a camera. The family celebrates the New Year together at Marthe's house, including both parents, who seem more comfortable together than before. Laurence's father invites her to travel with him to Greece to see the ruins of the ancient world, and she accepts.

=== Chapter 4 ===
This final chapter opens with a reference to a surrealist film by Luis Buñuel in which the characters can rebuild their lives, but involuntarily fall into the same obstacles (153). This is Laurence's fatalistic viewpoint when she falls ill in bed, unable to eat, in a kind of anorexic coma. From her bed, Laurence recounts the memory of her trip to Greece with her father. This narration is interrupted by a few interventions from the present, where Marthe and then Jean-Charles come to feed her and try to persuade her to see a doctor.

During her vacation, Laurence observes a young girl dancing in the street:

« Une petite fille s'est mise à danser, elle avait trois ou quatre ans; minuscule, brune, les yeux noirs, une robe jaune évasée en corolle autour de ses genoux, des chaussettes blanches; elle tournait sur elle-même, les bras soulevés, le visage noyé d'extase, l'air tout à fait folle. Transportée par la musique, éblouie, grisée, transfigurée, éperdue. Placide et grasse, sa mère bavardait avec une autre grosse femme, tout en faisant aller et venir une voiture d'enfant avec un bébé dedans; insensible à la musique, à la nuit, elle jetait parfois un regard bovin sur la petite inspirée. [...] Une charmante fillette qui deviendrait cette matrone. Non. Je ne voulait pas. [...] Petite condamnée à mort, affreuse mort sans cadavre. La vie allait l'assassiner. Je pensais à Catherine qu'on était en train d'assassiner » (158).

Son père l'informe qu'il reprend avec sa mère, Dominique, après avoir vécu séparément pendant plusieurs années. Il raconte que Dominique est devenue plus mature depuis la cassure avec Gilbert, et qu'ils se sentent bien ensemble (176). The rectification of her parents' marriage seems to bother Laurence, who loses some confidence in her father's judgment and even refers to the Oedipus complex (179). The return to Paris is happy, but Laurence is troubled by the psychologist's diagnosis that Catherine had seen: Jean-Charles insists that Catherine and Brigitte be separated and that they devise strategies to distract her, such as a trip to Rome for Easter and riding lessons. Laurence is exhausted and can't take it anymore. She takes to her bed in protest.

The novel concludes with the confrontation between the spouses, where Laurence finally takes control of the situation and insists that Catherine be allowed to spend Easter with her friend Brigitte. She defends the importance of friendship among young women and condemns forcing Catherine to conform to imposed expectations, which will harm her independence and happiness. Jean-Charles, who has always wanted to please Laurence, agrees, and the household is restored to harmony. Laurence looks at herself in the mirror and concludes: "The children will have their chance. What chance? She doesn't even know" (183).

In the literary study of the novel, there are indications that some readers find the conclusion of the novel insufficient: one of the volumes of the journal Simone de Beauvoir Studies published an imaginary fifth chapter written by a student from Manitoba in 2000, which envisions an ending that seems even more satisfying to her.

== Analysis and commentary ==
=== Recurring themes and images ===
==== Technology ====
Technology and the predictions made by Jean-Charles, Dufrène, and other characters representing intellectuals and elites in the novel are a recurring theme in their discourse. As architects, it is not surprising that these individuals are interested in modernity and urbanization. Technocratic society represents modern times. Some of Jean-Charles's visions have a hyperbolic air, characteristic of the science fiction genre, regarding the construction of hypotheses about the future (11).

Just as in the science fiction genre, Jean-Charles's predictions are sometimes marked by unrealistic haste, especially when he presumes that we will have explored our entire Solar System before 1985 (26). This is an example of extreme optimism among the intellectuals of the time. Yet, the confidence that these characters, like Jean-Charles, place in the future is as misplaced as any other: it is always an image of utopia that is not grounded in the reality of the present. These are scientifically possible, but logically improbable, alternatives. In Laurence's reflections, she sometimes takes up Jean-Charles's theme of wanting to live in the metropolis of the future (34), but she finds that living in the present is enough for her (61).

The recurring theme of technology and the dream of a utopian future where society is mechanized, which will never be realized, serve to illustrate the gap between image and reality. The implied messages in the idea that we are always, and forever, on the cusp of a technocratic movement are another example of the ethical contradictions that exacerbate Laurence's anxiety (103).

==== Flowers ====
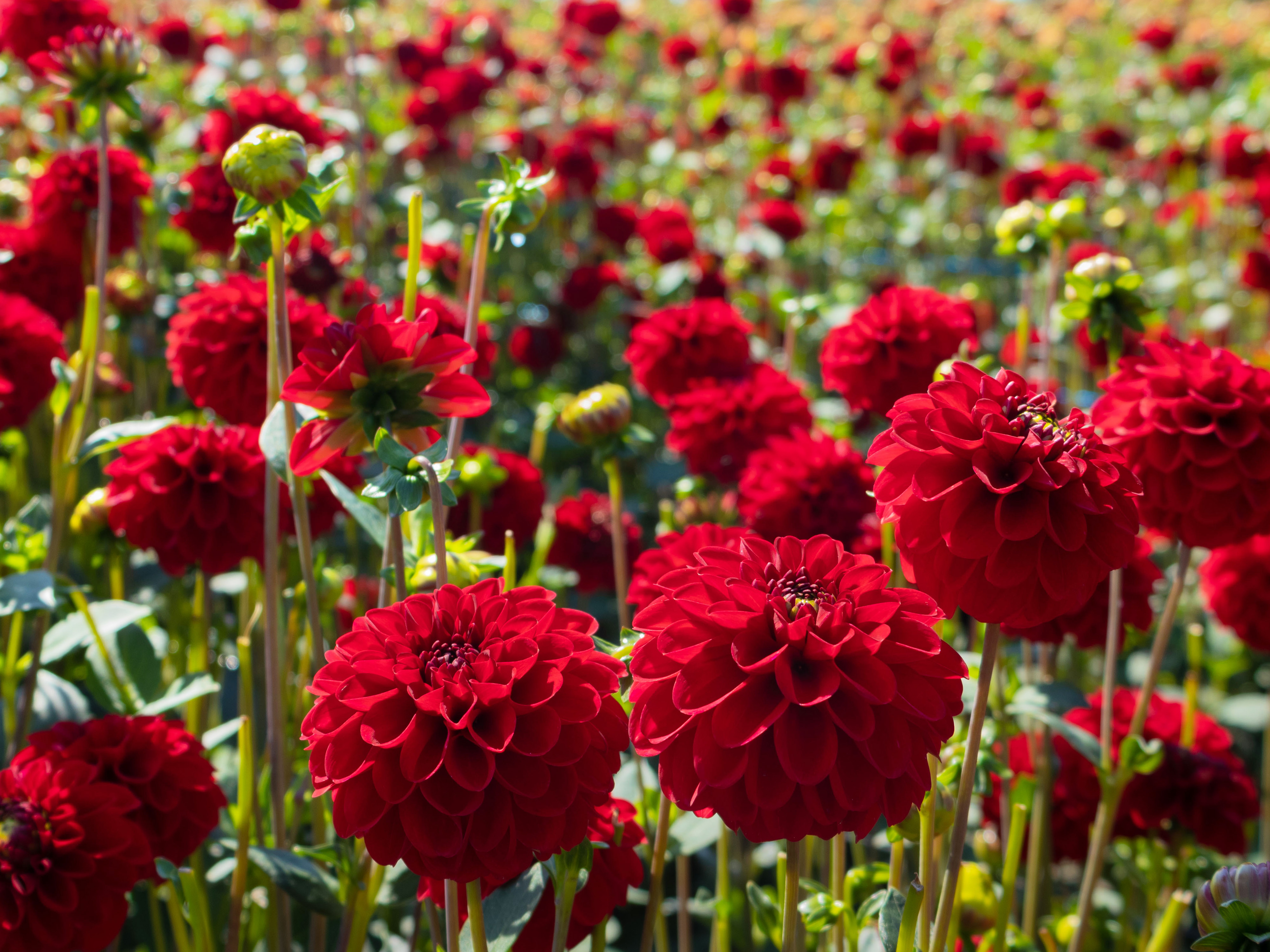
Flowers are used throughout Les Belles Images as a symbol of femininity.

The image of flowers is subtly woven throughout the novel. As a traditional symbol of femininity, the flowers that appear in certain scenes can serve as clues for readers about the women's state and how they experience their feminine condition in each situation. The roses, chrysanthemums, stars, and dahlias in the opening scene are, like the female characters, "the most beautiful in all of Île-de-France" (7). When Laurence feels embarrassed, she hesitates to speak and seems to strangle her flowers: "roses, reds, yellows, oranges, she clutches the magnificent dahlias in her hand" (14). Back home, the flowers blend perfectly with her surroundings, as if: "everything she touches turns into an image"(21). After a quarrel with Jean-Charles, a bouquet of red roses permeates the apartment to signal the return of peace between the spouses (136), and again, all the vases filled with flowers when she returns from vacation (170).

During visits to his mother, the flowers that appear in her apartment also reflect the meaning of her situation: firstly, "an enormous bouquet of sharp yellow flowers that look like nasty birds" (49 and 100) , when Gilbert has just broken up with her; then, the image of the orange blossom at Gilbert's wedding to Patricia (114) , which implies hope despite the seasons of natural life; next, "an overturned vase, scattered tulips" (123) following Gilbert's assault; lastly, the "spring flowers in Dominique's living room" (176 and 178) that come from Laurence's father, symbolizing the beginning of a new era.

==== The cyclical voices ====
On several occasions, Laurence imagines that the situations around her are being repeated simultaneously, in unfamiliar spaces, in parallel: "(Just now, in another garden, completely different, exactly the same, someone says these words and the same smile appears on another face [...])" (7–8). This cyclical echo is, for the narrator, a way of indicating her innate conviction that there are other women in the universe who share the same image, or who are experiencing the same situation as she is (137). These references become less frequent as the narrative progresses.

The memory of other characters' words follows Laurence throughout the narrative and repeatedly invades her thoughts. She often relives the image of her enraged mother and hears the echoes of Lucien, Gilbert, and Jean-Charles in her consciousness. According to Kalinowska: "This method of quotation, which erases the apparent marks of subjective presence, perfectly corresponds to the author's desire to 'make silence speak' [...] [and] Laurence herself gives the impression of being reduced to their mere physical support" (282) . One instance of these recurring voices that is particularly interesting is that of Mademoiselle Houchet, who appears randomly throughout the novel (11, 25, 43, 95, and 175), and who seems to symbolize the memory of Laurence's upbringing during her childhood.

=== The philosophical dimension of the novel ===
==== Existentialism ====
Intertwined with Laurence's situation is a desire for self-awareness and self-justification (282). The question posed to her by her daughter, Catherine, "Why do we exist?" (26) marks the beginning of a quest not only to be able to answer her, but to arrive at an agreement that resonates with her own being. The novel's plot, therefore, is how Laurence manages to resist doctrines that seem predetermined for her, to construct the essence of her life through her own actions—which is the fundamental thesis of the philosophy of Existentialism. Given that Simone de Beauvoir and Jean-Paul Sartre intellectually influenced each other, there are several literary vestiges of Sartrean existentialism in Les belles images. Despite his ability to secure a chance for his children to be different, towards the conclusion of the novel, there remains the impression that Laurence does not completely succeed in escaping his situation (181).

==== Consumerism ====
Consumerism is an issue in the novel. Gilbert's hi-fi stereo system (12–13) is the image of his wealth—an image that Jean-Charles and the others seem to want to capture for themselves as well. The exception to the desire to consume is Laurence's father, who lives in seclusion. In contrast, her father doesn't have a high-fidelity system, but he lives by principles that, according to Laurence, have real value (35). Dominique had left him for being too mediocre (178). For her part, Dominique always imitates the image and fashion of another successful woman (34), so much so that she seems to consume them one after the other like interchangeable products.

The image-driven culture that dominates Laurence's advertising work and her training in this field lead her to see herself as an abstract image, therefore, a product to be consumed (167), According to Bertrand, Beauvoir intended Laurence to be an example of the temptation within the French bourgeoisie of the time to reject consumer society and fall into indifference: "A feeling is expressed by Laurence that is deeper, more serious even than the failure she admits. This feeling is that of the temptation of indifference, indifference to beings, to situations, and to beings in situations". In an essay on Les belles images, Penrod concluded that the novel serves as a mirror reflecting wealthy consumers who are, in truth, very poor in moral terms (174).

Criticism of consumer society is among the themes that recur quite often in Simone de Beauvoir's other works, especially in the chapter entitled: The Point of View of Historical Materialism in The Second Sex. The birth of materialism is, according to Beauvoir, the beginning of the history of the defeat of the female sex (100).

=== Connections to The Second Sex ===
In general, The Second Sex posits that:

« La féminité n'est qu'une construction sociale et historique, présentée comme naturelle pour justifier la domination masculine. [...] Face à ce problème de la condition féminine, Simone de Beauvoir adopte explicitement la perspective de la morale existentialiste selon laquelle l'être humain ne trouve sa valeur que dans l'exercice de sa liberté ».

According to Kalinowska, Les Belles Images "appears young" in comparison with The Second Sex, because the situation of the female condition is supposedly "getting better", but Laurence's situation nevertheless carries a touch of irony in relation to this fact (277).

==== The maternity ward ====
The incident with the cyclist leads Laurence to question her maternal instincts. She concludes that Jean-Charles: "is another self [...] we are united. I acted as if I were alone. But to put my daughters in danger to spare a stranger, what absurdity!" (104). This scene also echoes The Second Sex and the idea of maternal imbalance, where a woman is "profoundly maternal" to the point where she can become enraged against or even oblivious to her husband (385).

Laurence identifies with her daughter, Catherine. Her father notices this: "Catherine is the one who resembles you most. At her age, you had that gravity" (104). The maternal instinct to protect Catherine is thus reinforced by the image of little Laurence that she carries within her. Laurence ends up, to correct the mistakes of her own upbringing, by freeing her children from the constraints that have mutilated her (122 and 134). This decision of Laurence alludes to the situation of motherhood as it is described to us in The Second Sex : "There are women who are satisfied enough with their lives to wish to be reincarnated as a daughter or at least to welcome one without disappointment; they will want to give their children the chances they had, and also those they did not have: they will give them a happy childhood" (374). This theme is also present in Beauvoir's memoirs, Une mort très douce, seen in the relationship between Simone and her mother, Françoise de Beauvoir.

==== The wedding ====
In the situation of the married woman as described in The Second Sex , we find the conviction that for a woman to marry is to become "another" in relation to the status of the man—the husband (220). For Laurence in Les Belles Images , this impression is deployed when she notices that she feels she does not have her own destiny:

« L'amour, la maternité, c'est un choc émotionnel violent, quand on se marie très jeune, et qu'entre l'intelligence et l'affectivité il ne s'est pas encore établi un harmonieux équilibre. Il me semblait n'avoir plus d'avenir : Jean-Charles, les petites avaient un ; moi pas ; alors à quoi bon me cultiver ? » (43).

Beauvoir accurately describes the situation of the young married woman:

« La jeune fille apparaît-elle comme absolument passive [.] [...] Ils cherchent dans le mariage une expansion, une confirmation de leur existence mais non-le droit même d'exister ; c'est une charge qu'ils assument librement. [...] [Ce] n'est pour eux qu'un mode de vie, non-un destin » (232).

==== Old age ====
The novel Les Belles Images begins and ends with two parallel scenes: Dominique looks at herself in the mirror in Feuverolles (16), then Laurence (183). In these scenes, we find the struggle women make against aging as described in the transition from maturity to old age in "The Second Sex" (456). Beauvoir describes the perilous situation by explaining that the aging woman must ask herself questions when she looks in the mirror: "What will become of her when she no longer has any hold over [men]? [...] she feels touched by the very inevitability of death" (451). This feeling resonates strongly in Dominique's tears when she finally accepts the final break with Gilbert: "I have nothing left but to die" (124). Once women feel they are losing their virility, they suffer from no longer being able to regain their equilibrium. Les Belles Images provide us with excellent and tragic examples of this struggle.

Moreover, Gilbert's situation in choosing to marry the daughter of one of his former lovers may also be a rewriting of the testimony of Mrs. BZ which is provided to us in The Second Sex (455–456).

==== Modernity and the successful woman ====
In Laurence, there is a desire to escape the shortcomings of the false image she has of men, who seem to share with her the capacity to be for oneself . On a physical level with Jean-Charles, then Lucien, and then on a philosophical level with her father, Laurence discovers after some time that the men in her life cannot relieve her anxiety (110). In describing the situation of the independent woman in Les Belles Images , Beauvoir explains: "[that] it is natural for a woman to try to escape from this world where she often feels unrecognized and misunderstood [...] they feel crushed by the world of culture because it is a world of men: they can only stammer" (622).

The character of Laurence symbolizes the image of the modern woman, the woman who manages to achieve independence despite the difficulties in her life. At first glance, she appears as a rewriting of the independent woman from Les Belles Images. Dominique insists: "All my life I’ve struggled. [...] You think it’s beautiful to succeed on your own! You don’t know what it’s like. What you have to do, and endure, especially when you’re a woman. All my life I’ve been humiliated" (114–115). There is an element of despair in this statement, illustrating a touch of irony. Although Laurence seems to have achieved the modernity and independence that Les Belles Images had argued for, she nevertheless finds herself broken and dejected: "Old and alone: it’s awful. [...] Dominique is crying. Beneath the masks, there is a woman of flesh and blood, with a heart, who feels herself growing old and is terrified by loneliness; She murmurs: 'a woman without a man is a lonely woman'.

Although Les Belles Images constructs on the surface the image that: "feminism today is outdated" (99), the true situation of the female condition that Beauvoir describes in The Second Sex cannot resist influencing the awareness of the female characters in the novel..

== Editions ==
- Éditions Gallimard, coll. « Blanche », 1966
- LGF, coll. « Le Livre de poche » No. 3217, 1971
- Gallimard, coll. « Folio » No. 243, 1972

== Bibliography ==
- ANGELFORS, Christina, « La parole paralysée : une lecture du mode de narration dans 'Les belles images' de Simone de Beauvoir » Simone de Beauvoir Studies 8, 1991, 131–136.
- GRAY, Margaret E., « Narcissism, Abjection and the Reader of Simone de Beauvoir's 'Les belles image' » Studies in Twentieth and Twenty First Century Literature 32 : 1, 2008, 4–52.
- GUYOT-BENDER, Martine, « Grandeur et misère de la lecture : 'Les belles images' de Simone de Beauvoir » Women in French Studies, 2012, 134–149.
- HELLERSTEIN, Nina S., « Temporal and Existential Structures in Simone de Beauvoir's 'Les belles images' : Mechanical Reproductions Versus Transcendence » Symposium : A Quarterly Journal in Modern Literatures 54.1, 2000, 16–26.
- HOLLAND, Alison, « 'Les Belles Images' » Excess and Transgression in Simone de Beauvoir's Fiction : The Discourse of Madness, Cornwall, Ashgate Publishing Ltd., 2009, 115–159 ISBN 978-0-7546-5152-9.
- HOLLAND, Alison, « Simone de Beauvoir's Writing Practice : Madness, Enumeration and Repetition in 'Les belles images' » Simone de Beauvoir Studies 15, 1998, 113–125.
- IKAZAKI, Yassue, Simone de Beauvoir, la narration en question, Paris, éd. L'Harmattan, 2011, 304p. ISBN 978-2-296-54722-3.
- KOSKI, Raija H., « 'Les belles images' de Simone de Beauvoir : la femme et le langage » Simone de Beauvoir Studies 9, 1992, 55–59.
- PAGÈS, Irène M., « Beauvoir's 'Les belles images' : "Desubstantification" of Reality through a Narrative » Forum for Modern Language Studies 11, 1975, 133–141.
- TEST, Mary Lawrence, « Simone de Beauvoir : le refus de l'avenir : l'image de la femme dans 'Les mandarins' et 'Les belles images' » Simone de Beauvoir Studies 11, 1994, 19–29.
- TIDD, Ursula, « 'Les belles images' : Countering the Refusal of History » Simone de Beauvoir's Fiction : Women and Language, New York, Peter Lang Publishing, Inc., 2005, 137–156 ISBN 0-8204-7085-6.
- WAELTI-WALTERS, Jennifer, « Plus ça change : A Study of 'Les belles images' in Relation to 'Le deuxième sexe' » Perspectives on Contemporary Literature 4 : 2, 1978, 22–31.

== See also ==
- Simone de Beauvoir Prize
