= A Very Easy Death =

1964 non-fiction work by Simone de Beauvoir

A Very Easy Death (French: Une mort très douce) is a short book written by existentialist philosopher Simone de Beauvoir documenting her experience in the weeks leading up to her mother's death in 1963. The book, published in French in 1964, is both a biographical and autobiographical work, recounting the life of her mother, Françoise de Beauvoir, as well as Simone de Beauvoir's own. Jean-Paul Sartre, Beauvoir's lifelong partner, considered this book Beauvoir's best work.

== Background ==
While away on a trip to Rome, Beauvoir received news that her mother fell in her apartment and broke her femur. To recover from the fall, Françoise was taken to a clinic. However, at the clinic, a more life threatening health concern emerged: Françoise had terminal intestinal cancer. Beauvoir kept a journal throughout her mother's illness, which she used to write A Very Easy Death in December 1963, after her death. While Beauvoir recorded the way her friends, Jacques-Laurent Bost, Olga Kosakiewicz, and Claude Lanzmann, supported her during this difficult time in her journal, not much of this subject is written in the book. As described in the text, Françoise's caretakers decide to keep her diagnosis of terminal cancer secret from her in order to not dash her hopes of recovery; this practice of keeping the true diagnosis from the patient was not uncommon in France at this time.

=== Motivation for writing ===
One motivation for writing was Beauvoir's desire to record a more complete picture of her mother, including the good years in their relationship, than appeared in her earlier memoirs, Memoirs of a Dutiful Daughter or The Prime of Life. Compared to these earlier autobiographies, Beauvoir paints a more favorable portrait of her mother in A Very Easy Death.

=== Françoise de Beauvoir ===
Françoise de Beauvoir (1886-1963) was born to a wealthy family in Alsace-Lorraine, a former German territory now a part of France. She attended Catholic school as a child and married Georges de Beauvoir in 1907. Later, she experienced financial difficulties as her father went bankrupt around World War I and Georges' business enterprises went under. She was the mother of two children, Simone and Hélène. After Georges' death when Françoise was 54, she studied and earned a certification as a librarian, moved into a studio apartment, and traveled.

== Summary ==
Simone de Beauvoir receives news from a neighbor in the Fall of 1963, that her mother, who was 77, had experienced a fall, and broke her femur. Luckily, the injury was expected to heal after three months of rest. Later in her hospital stay, Beauvoir and her sister are told by the doctors that their mother has terminal cancer, the illness she has feared her whole life. The sisters decide to keep the diagnosis hidden from their mom, and have to make a decision of whether she should have the surgery the doctors recommend. A nurse tells Beauvoir not to let the surgery happen, which accords with Beauvoir's desire to not let her mother suffer unduly. In the end, both Hélène and the doctors want her to have the surgery, so Beauvoir agrees, but Beauvoir reconsiders whether this was the best decision throughout the remaining text.

The seriousness of her mother's condition weighs on Beauvoir more than she expected. There is a moment in the text when Beauvoir cries while at home and shares her feelings with Sartre. He says that Beauvoir has put her mother's mouth on her own face, copying her mother's movements as her own.

In the next section, Beauvoir retells the story of her mother's life, beginning with her unhappy childhood in the countryside. At home, Françoise felt that her mother chose her sister and husband as favorites, leaving her alone. She attended a small convent school as a child. Later, Françoise married her husband, who Beauvoir thinks made her happy for ten years. Beauvoir explains that Françoise's marriage caused her opportunities and social life to be limited by the wants of her husband. Moreover, her husband kept mistresses and had financial difficulties, causing Françoise unhappiness and necessitating that she take on a larger role in the housekeeping. Once she had kids, Beauvoir explains that her mother devoted her energy into raising them, which left Simone and Hélène feeling suffocated and worsened their relationship. Beauvoir thinks her mother was not given the advantages of an education that encouraged independent or critical thinking, causing her to adopt the values and decisions of others and society without complaint, even when they were contradictory or did not serve her well in Beauvoir's eyes.

Returning to the time of her mother's illness, the sisters develop a routine taking care of their mother, which Beauvoir notes, effectively limited the size of their life to the hospital room. Beauvoir writes that she feels a new affection for her mother, as she focuses intently on enjoying the sensations of her days, such as appreciating the cool feel of metal or the light from the window. On days when her mother is in pain, Beauvoir records feeling guilty for allowing the surgery to proceed. The sisters are surprised that their mother, who was a devout Catholic, never requests a visit from a priest. Beauvoir and her sister grow weary of the emotional toll of their mother's ups and downs throughout her illness, but Beauvoir acknowledges that she feels fond of her mom in a way she hadn't been since adolescence. Beauvoir's mother's conditions continue to get worse and she slept for many hours, during the day. Françoise dies at night, when Simone was at home, after lapsing into a coma.

Beauvoir analyzes her mother's death and describes the funerary rites. Beauvoir says in the aftermath, she regrets not trying to make her mother's life happier while she was still alive. She also examines the decision to allow the operation, determining that there were likely positives and negatives for both decisions on her mom and loved ones. She says that her mom, compared to others, had an easy death, because she could have been in worse conditions where she would have had less privacy. The sisters clean out their mother's hospital room, return her belongings to her apartment, and attend her funeral. In her belongings taken from the hospital, Beauvoir finds her mother's handwritten funeral instructions.

Beauvoir spends time reflecting on why her mother's death was so significant to her compared to her father's passing. She recalls happy dreams where her mother merged with Sartre. Beauvoir underscores that her and her mother's past misunderstanding was sad, but inevitable given the way Françoise was raised. During her illness, Beauvoir finds her mother more lovable to her as she renounced social conventions and turned her focus to her own life. The book ends with the sentiment that death, even of a person of an old age, is painful and difficult.

== Themes and critical analysis ==
=== Critique of the medical system ===
Beauvoir records her dislike for some of the doctors who handle her mother and her illness as a science experiment, rather than as a patient needing care. She writes about the difficulty in opposing the recommendations of the doctors, who want to perform surgery on her mother to extend her life. While Beauvoir has concerns that this will cause her mother needless suffering, she reports feeling as though she had no choice but to accept the surgery and keep the true diagnosis from her mother. Some critics view Beauvoir's account as a reproach of medical paternalism. Scholars note that Beauvoir intentionally utilizes the full names of nurses, who Beauvoir writes are generally kind and helpful to her mother, and shortens the names of the doctors, who Beauvoir generally dislikes.

=== Mother-daughter relationship ===
Beauvoir explores her relationship with her mother in this work, touching on their past and present memories and describing a range of emotions related to her mother. As Beauvoir recognizes her mother's strength and desire to live, she sees her humanity, which allows her to move beyond their past misunderstandings. In a letter written to her lover Nelson Algren around the time of her mother's death, Beauvoir writes that during her illness, she held her mother closest in her heart since her childhood. Critics note that Beauvoir's renewed bond with her mother corresponds with a role reversal between mother and daughter. Simone and Hélène took on the role of the caretaker, while Françoise's illness forced her into the role of the dependent.

=== Existentialist themes ===
==== The Other ====
Scholars write that Beauvoir's book touches on ideas of "the Other," which are also present in her earlier book The Second Sex. Beauvoir highlights that her mother was raised in a social context where she was taught to police herself into adherence with strict social conventions which restricted her life, especially when she got married and her desires become secondary to her husband's wants. Beauvoir's writing suggests she thinks that her mother largely accepted social conformity at the cost of living a life that made her unhappy because she was not taught to question the values of conformity.

Additionally, scholars suggest that Beauvoir's account underscores how people with diseases are treated as "the Other" in society. Specifically, people affected with illness and subsequent physical decline are often treated as a non-person or infantile.

==== Freedom ====
Beauvoir's book draws on the theme that when a person is dying, their freedom and the freedom of their loved ones is limited. Beauvoir and her sister physically visited their mother often, limiting their ability to travel beyond the hospital room. Also, Beauvoir felt compelled to make decisions in agreement with the medical system, rather than her instincts.

==== Authenticity ====
Scholars suggest two examples where Beauvoir writes about authenticity in A Very Easy Death. The first is Beauvoir's connection with her mother as she lives more authentically during her illness. Beauvoir's biography of her mother highlights that her mother lived inauthentically, choosing to accept the constraints and limits of social norms associated with being a woman, rather than questioning them. However, during her illness, her mother casts off these conventions and lives freely, despite her limited mobility during her illness. Beauvoir praises her mother for focusing on her own desires, rather than desiring to conform to society.

The second is when Beauvoir chooses to let her mother's surgery proceed, despite her instinct that it might prolong her suffering. When a nurse tells her to not let her mother have surgery, Beauvoir does not heed the advice, despite her intuition that it is the correct choice. Thus, she yields to the authority of the medical field and technology, and proceeds to hide the truth from her mother about the severity of her illness. She goes as far as to say she and her sister had no choice, because telling her the truth would have destroyed her mother's hope.

== Reception ==
Scholars note that while men's deaths are often recorded in literature, it is rarer for women's to be recorded. Thus, Beauvoir's book is a notable example of a woman writing about another woman's death.

Some journalists accused Beauvoir of profiting from her mother's death. However, Beauvoir said that the act of writing about the experience was comforting.

This work is thematically related to her later works that deal with death and old age, The Coming of Age and Adieux, A Farewell to Sartre. These books deal with subjects of old age and Sartre's death, respectively. A scholar suggests that the growth of Beauvoir's relationship with her mother during her illness shaped her perspective on old age, and even possibly inspired The Coming of Age. Additionally, a book critic has noted similarities between A Very Easy Death and a book later written by French author and Nobel Laureate Annie Ernaux, A Women's Story, which is a biography of her mother's Alzheimer's disease and death.

Beauvoir's adopted daughter, Sylvie Le Bon-de Beauvoir, said that Beauvoir told her the story of A Very Easy Death, asking if she should write it, and Sylvie gave her encouragement. Sylvie said this was what brought them closer together.

== English translation ==
This work was translated into English by novelist and translator Patrick O'Brian.
