= Mark Schorer =

American writer, critic, and scholar

- Born: May 17, 1908; Sauk City, Wisconsin
- Died: August 11, 1977 (aged 69); Oakland, California
- Education: University of Wisconsin–Madison, Harvard University
- Occupation: Author
- Writing career
- Notable works: Sinclair Lewis: An American Life, Colonel Markesan and Less Pleasant People

Mark Schorer (May 17, 1908 – August 11, 1977) was an American writer, critic, and scholar born in Sauk City, Wisconsin.

== Biography ==
Schorer earned an MA at Harvard and his Ph.D. in English at the University of Wisconsin–Madison in 1936. During his academic career, he held positions at Dartmouth, Harvard, and the University of California, Berkeley, where he chaired the Department of English from 1960 to 1965. A leading critic of his time, he was best known for his work, Sinclair Lewis: An American Life. Schorer was also the author of many short stories, which appeared in magazines such as The New Yorker, Harpers, The Atlantic Monthly, and Esquire.

Among his honors were three Guggenheim Fellowships, a Fulbright professorship at the University of Pisa and a fellowship at the Center for Advanced Study in Behavioral Sciences at Stanford. He also was elected to the American Academy of Arts and Sciences, the most prestigious honor society for creative arts in the country.

Schorer was called as an expert witness during the 1957 obscenity trial over the Allen Ginsberg poem Howl, and testified in defense of the poem. This incident is dramatized in the film Howl (2010), in which Schorer is portrayed by Treat Williams.

In addition to his scholarly works, he also co-authored a series of science-fiction and horror stories with writer, publisher and childhood friend (both being natives of Sauk City, Wisconsin) August Derleth. These stories, originally published mainly in Weird Tales magazine during the 1920s and 1930s, were eventually anthologized in Colonel Markesan and Less Pleasant People (1966).

Schorer died from a blood infection following bladder surgery in Oakland, California at the age of 69.

== Bibliography ==
=== Novels ===
- A House Too Old (Reynal & Hitchcock, 1935)
- The Hermit Place (Random House, 1941)
- The Wars of Love (McGraw-Hill, 1954)

=== Stories ===
- The State of Mind: Thirty-Two Stories (Houghton Mifflin, 1947)
- Colonel Markesan and Less Pleasant People, with August Derleth (Arkham House, 1966)
- Pieces of Life (Farrar, Straus & Giroux, 1977)

=== Other ===
- William Blake: The Politics of Vision (Henry Holt, 1946)
- The Story: A Critical Anthology (Prentice-Hall, 1950)
- Sinclair Lewis: An American Life (McGraw-Hill, 1961)
- D. H. Lawrence (Dell, 1968)
- The World We Imagine: Selected Essays (Farrar, Straus & Giroux, 1968)
- The Literature of America: Twentieth Century (Mc-Graw Hill, 1970)

== See also ==
- August Derleth
