= La Déchirure =

1966 novel by Henry Bauchau

The Tear
- Author: Henry Bauchau
- Original title: La Déchirure
- Language: French
- Publication date: 1966

La Déchirure (The Tear) is the first novel by Belgian writer Henry Bauchau. It was first published in 1966.
