= The Coming of Age (book) =

1970 book by Simone de Beauvoir

- First US edition
- Author: Simone de Beauvoir
- Original title: La Vieillesse
- Language: French
- Publisher: Éditions Gallimard, G. P. Putnam's Sons
- Publication date: 1970
- Publication place: France
- English publication date: 1972

The Coming of Age (La Vieillesse) is a 1970 book by the French existentialist philosopher Simone de Beauvoir, in which the author calls for a new understanding of old age. It is a founding text in the field of cultural gerontology, and today many scholars refer to Beauvoir as the "godmother" of age studies.

== Synopsis ==
The structure of the book is similar to that of The Second Sex. In the first half of The Coming of Age, Beauvoir writes about biology, culture, and history, attempting to provide a broad overview of old age. In the second half, she makes a philosophical argument about aging, and she writes about how certain individuals, such as Sigmund Freud and Victor Hugo, experienced old age.

At the beginning of the book, Beauvoir asserts that modern capitalist societies treat the old as "walking corpses," rather than as human beings. As soon as French citizens enter retirement, she claims, they are viewed as unproductive waste. Because it is in the interest of the exploiting class to break the solidarity between workers and those who are unproductive—so that the latter are not defended by anyone—the young are encouraged to ignore the old and to treat them as inhuman Others. But if the voices of the siloed, invisible old could be heard, Beauvoir writes, listeners would hear the humanity in these voices. She urges her readers to listen to the old—to help her break the reigning “conspiracy of silence”—and concludes her introduction with a call to action: “I call upon my readers to help me."

== Reception ==
The Coming of Age went neglected for many decades. In the wake of the COVID-19 pandemic, the nursing home scandals in France, and most recently, the adoption of la loi “bien vieillir” in France, Beauvoir’s groundbreaking treatise on old age has begun enjoying a critical renaissance. For example, French authors Laure Adler and Didier Eribon have published books about ageism that draw and expand on Beauvoir’s arguments, and multiple academic journals have devoted special issues to her philosophy of aging.

== Translations ==
The book was published in France by Éditions Gallimard under the title La Vieillesse in 1970. When it was published in England in 1972, it was called Old Age. American publishers feared that readers would not read a book called Old Age, and so they changed the title to The Coming of Age, which does not reflect the book's contents.
