= The Impossible Man =

Book by J.G. Ballard

- Cover of the first edition
- Author: J. G. Ballard
- Cover artist: Richard M. Powers
- Language: English
- Genre: Science fiction
- Publisher: Berkley Books
- Publication date: 1966
- Publication place: United States
- Media type: Print (paperback)
- Pages: 160 pp

The Impossible Man and other Stories is a 1966 collection of science fiction short stories by J. G. Ballard.

== Contents ==
- "The Drowned Giant"
- "The Reptile Enclosure"
- "The Delta at Sunset"
- "Storm-Bird, Storm-Dreamer"
- "The Screen Game"
- "The Day of Forever"
- "Time of Passage"
- "The Gioconda of the Twilight Noon"
- "The Impossible Man"
