= Magic Elizabeth =

1966 children's novel by Norma Kassirer

- 1966 Scholastic Cover
- Author: Norma Kassierer
- Illustrator: Joe Krush
- Cover artist: Joe Krush
- Language: English
- Genre: Mystery, Children's literature
- Publisher: Viking Press, Scholastic
- Publication date: 1966
- Publication place: United States
- Media type: Print (hardcover & paperback)
- Pages: 192 (Scholastic edition)
- ISBN: 0-670-44817-6 (first edition, hard)
- OCLC: 22921733

Magic Elizabeth (1966) is a children's mystery novel by Norma Kassirer. Nine-year-old Sally is left in the care of an elderly aunt in a spooky old house, and becomes enthralled by the portrait of another girl who lived in the house long ago, and the story of her lost doll, Elizabeth. Finding the girl's belongings in a trunk in the attic, Sally seems to experience the episodes in her predecessor's diary, and gradually finds that she is not as alone as she felt when she arrived. With the encouragement of those around her, she resolves to find the long-lost doll, whom the other girl had come to believe possessed magical powers.

== Background ==
Norma Kassirer, née Kelly (1924–2013), was a writer and painter. She wrote two children's novels that involved lost dolls: Magic Elizabeth in 1966, and The Doll Snatchers in 1969. She also authored poetry and short stories, and exhibited her artwork in western New York. A third children's novel, The Knitting Witch, was published posthumously in 2024. Describing Kassirer's stories in 1991, John Barth said that they were "sly, wry and fanciful, fairy-tale realistic."

Written for children in middle grades, Magic Elizabeth was inspired by letters passed down in Kassirer's family from the eighteenth century. It was published by Viking in 1966, and by special arrangement, in a paperback edition by Scholastic the same year. It was reprinted by HarperCollins in 1999. Each edition features illustrations by Joe Krush. In 2000, Magic Elizabeth was included in the New York Times Parent's Guide to the Best Books for Children. Page proofs and a jacket proof featuring Krush's illustrations are held in the University of Minnesota Libraries' Norma Kassirer Collection.

== Plot summary ==
On a stormy summer night, Sally, aged nine, going on ten, is brought to stay with her great-aunt, Sarah, while her parents are out of town. Sally has no memory of her aunt, who moved to California years before, and has only recently returned. Sarah lives in a dark and foreboding house, sandwiched between tall buildings. Sally finds her elderly aunt stern and unpleasant, and is scolded for not wiping her feet before entering. Aunt Sarah's black cat, Shadow, seems equally unfriendly, and Sally begins to imagine her aunt as a witch.

After an unappealing dinner in an otherwise cozy kitchen, Aunt Sarah takes Sally to a surprisingly pleasant bedroom that once belonged to another little girl named Sally, depicted in a painting over the fireplace. Sally is astonished to see that the girl in the portrait looks just like her, down to her red hair and freckles. In her lap, the other Sally holds a beautiful doll, Elizabeth.

In the morning, Sally peers through the window at the overgrown back garden. Though now surrounded by apartment buildings, Aunt Sarah says that the house once was part of a farm on a rural road. Sally begins to explore when her aunt goes out, and she finds the attic, with a trunk containing the other Sally's belongings. She tries on the same clothes that she had seen in the portrait. There is no sign of Elizabeth, but Sally finds a diary containing just three entries, all from 1899, when the other little girl was ten.

After reading the diary, Sally looks deeply into an old mirror, and thinks that the other Sally is looking back. She then seems to experience the first of the episodes in the diary, as through the eyes of the other Sally. On a cold night in January, the family cat has given birth to kittens, and the doll, Elizabeth, seems to choose the black kitten, whom Sally names Tom, for herself. Sally then awakens from what she assumes was a dream. Aunt Sarah finds her in the attic wearing the other Sally's clothes, but to her relief, her aunt isn't angry. Sally asks whether Elizabeth, who was later lost, was ever found, but Aunt Sarah sadly informs her that she was not.

Aunt Sarah and Shadow seem less unpleasant as Sally gets to know them. Sally makes a friend, eight-year-old Emily, from one of the neighboring apartments, and the two explore the garden. When Sally's parents telephone and offer to cut their trip short and retrieve her, Sally decides that she's happy to stay a little longer.

Returning to the attic, Sally again searches for Elizabeth, and experiences another vision as her long-ago mirror image: a magical summer day in the back garden with friends, family, and the half-grown kittens. Elizabeth seems to conjure a cool breeze just when Sally needs it, then Tom tries to pick up the doll and run off with her.

Sally, Emily, and aunt Sarah share a lunch and make gingerbread cookies, then the two girls explore the attic. Following Shadow, Emily finds a doll's bonnet in the space between the roof and the attic floor: Sally recognizes it as Elizabeth's, but there is still no sign of the doll. Further searches are postponed when Sally falls ill, and has to stay in bed. But her eagerness to solve the mystery is rekindled when Shadow appears with what looks like a golden doll's hair in his paw.

As Sally recovers, her aunt explains that the apartment building owners want to buy the house and demolish it so they can expand. Sally is saddened, and resolves not to leave Elizabeth unfound. In the attic, she experiences the other Sally's Christmas Eve in 1899, and sees the beloved doll placed atop the Christmas tree, only to disappear without a trace while the family is singing around the melodeon.

Sally deduces that Elizabeth must have fallen from the tree, and been carried off by Tom. She also suspects that Shadow has been trying to lead her to the doll's hiding place. Reaching into the dark space between the roof and the attic floor, Sally discovers Elizabeth and rescues her, dirty but otherwise unharmed, presenting the doll to her overjoyed aunt. Sally's parents arrive to collect her, and only when her mother addresses "Aunt Sal" does she realize that the other Sally is now her aunt Sarah. Sarah gives Elizabeth to Sally, and decides not to sell the house if Sally will come and visit, a condition to which Sally and her parents happily agree.
