= A Song at Twilight =

Play written by Noël Coward

Noël Coward and Lilli Palmer in the original production of A Song at Twilight

A Song at Twilight is a play in two acts by Noël Coward. It is one of a trio of plays collectively titled Suite in Three Keys, all of which are set in the same suite in a luxury hotel in Switzerland. The play depicts an elderly writer confronted by his former mistress with facts about his past life that he would prefer to forget.

First produced in London in 1966, the play is one of Coward's last works for the stage.

== Background and productions ==
The original idea for A Song at Twilight was inspired by Lord David Cecil's biography of Max Beerbohm, in which Cecil described Constance Collier's late-life visit to Beerbohm at his home in Italy. Coward said, "I thought how funny this was. There was Max's old flame coming to visit him, but so much more vital still than him that she totally exhausted him in seconds." Coward developed this by making his author a closeted homosexual, whose relations with women have been mainly for camouflage. Many people took the character to be based on Somerset Maugham, and Coward's stage make up was thought to underline the point by its "curious" resemblance to Maugham.

The play was first produced at the Queen's Theatre, London on 14 April 1966, directed by Vivian Matalon. Suite in Three Keys was planned by Coward as his theatrical swan song: "I would like to act once more before I fold my bedraggled wings." Coward's previous play, Waiting in the Wings (1960), had not been a critical success, but the climate of opinion had changed in the intervening six years, and Coward's works had undergone a period of rediscovery and re-evaluation, which Coward called "Dad's Renaissance". This had begun with a successful revival of Private Lives at the Hampstead Theatre and continued with a new production of Hay Fever at the National Theatre. His co-stars in A Song at Twilight were Lilli Palmer (Carlotta), Irene Worth (Hilde) and Sean Barrett (Felix).

The play was revived in 1999 for Coward's centennial in a production at the Gielgud Theatre directed by Sheridan Morley. The cast included Vanessa Redgrave as Carlotta, Kika Markham as Hilde, Corin Redgrave as Hugo and Matthew Bose as Felix. The play then went on a UK tour in 2009 (directed by Nikolai Foster, with Peter Egan as Hugo, Belinda Lang as Carlotta, Kerry Peers as Hilde and Daniel Bayle as Felix) and another in 2019 (directed by Stephen Unwin, with Simon Callow as Hugo, Jane Asher as Carlotta, Jessica Turner as Hilde and Ash Rizi as Felix.)

== Plot ==
Hilde Latymer, Sir Hugo's former secretary and for nearly twenty years his wife, discusses literary business by telephone. Hugo joins her and displays signs of nervousness at the impending arrival of Carlotta. He explains to Hilde that his affair with Carlotta "lasted exactly two years and we parted in a blaze of mutual acrimony". He does not know why she now wishes to see him again after so many years.

Carlotta arrives. Hilde introduces herself and leaves Carlotta alone with Hugo. Their reminiscences of old times together mix sentimental and waspish memories. The atmosphere becomes tense when Carlotta asks for Hugo's permission to reproduce some of his love letters to her in her forthcoming memoirs. He refuses, and she offers to return them to him, as they are no further use to her. However, she has in her possession other letters written by Hugo – to Perry Sheldon, whom she knew in his dying days, and who, she says, was "the only true love" of Hugo's life. Hugo admits that in the past he had "homosexual tendencies". Carlotta dismisses this, and tells him, "You're as queer as a coot and you have been all your life." She reproaches him for his neglect of Perry, his former lover, and also for his pretence of heterosexuality which has made his novels and especially his autobiography dishonest.

Hilde returns. To Hugo's amazement she knows all about his affair with Perry, and she persuades Carlotta to return all the letters that Hugo wrote to him. Carlotta gives them to Hugo. In return, Hugo changes his mind about his letters to her, and gives his consent to their publication in her book. Hilde shows Carlotta out, and returns to find Hugo reading his old letters, "deeply moved... with a sigh [he] covers his eyes with a hand".

== Roles and original cast ==
- Hilde Latymer – Irene Worth
- Felix, a waiter – Sean Barrett
- Hugo Latymer – Noël Coward
- Carlotta Gray – Lilli Palmer

== Critical reception ==
In his diary Coward wrote, "Well, the most incredible thing has happened. Not only has A Song at Twilight opened triumphantly, but the Press notices have on the whole been extremely good. Most particularly the Express and the Evening Standard. Fortunately the Sun struck a sour note... which convinced me that I hadn't entirely slipped." The Times, noting the parallel with Maugham, praised both the play and the acting. The critic of The Daily Mail said, "as the curtain fell last night I felt oddly elated, as if I had recaptured the flavour of an exclusive drink which one tasted when young but has never been mixed quite right since. I know the name of it now: not mannerism, not bravura, not histrionics, but style."

Coward later said of Neil Simon's 1968 Plaza Suite, "Such a good idea having different plays all played in a hotel suite! I wonder where Neil Simon got it from?"
