= Chike and the River =

1966 children novel by Chinua Achebe

- First edition
- Author: Chinua Achebe
- Language: English
- Genre: Fiction
- Publisher: Cambridge University Press
- Publication date: 1966
- Publication place: Nigeria
- Media type: Print (Hardback)
- Pages: 64 pp

Chike and the River is a children's story by Chinua Achebe. It was first published in South Africa in the year 1966 by Cambridge University Press, with illustrations by Prue Theobalds, and was the first of several children's stories Achebe would write. The latest reprint has a cover design by Victor Ekpuk.

Chinua Achebe first published Chike and the River as a booklet in 1966 after his daughter started preschool in Nigeria and he noticed that most of the school texts for African children were written by Westerners.

== Plot ==
It is the story of a Nigerian boy called Chike who leaves his village, Umuofia, to go and stay with his uncle in the big city of Onitsha. He has a lot of friends that made him thrilled when they met and he was the only child to survive crossing the river.

== Reviews ==
Reviewing a 2011 reprint of the book, New York Journal of Books said: "In Chike and the River, young readers get an intimate look at African life, learn about the Niger River, and connect with Chike as if he was their own sibling. The brilliance of Mr. Achebe’s prose is his ability to make a readers feel like an omniscient sprite on Chike’s shoulder: along for the ride and privy to all that he senses and sees."
