= Salt Is Leaving =

1966 mystery novel by J.B. Priestley

- First edition (UK)
- Author: J. B. Priestley
- Language: English
- Genre: Mystery
- Publisher: Pan Books (UK); Harper & Row (US)
- Publication date: 1966
- Publication place: United Kingdom
- Media type: Print

Salt Is Leaving is a 1966 mystery novel by the British writer J.B. Priestley. Doctor Salt begins to investigate when one of his patients Noreen Wilks goes missing for three weeks. Despite a lack of interest from the police, he becomes convinced that she has in fact been murdered.

== Bibliography ==
- Klein, Holger. J.B. Priestley's Fiction. Peter Lang, 2002.
