= Sam Szafran =

French artist (1934–2019)

Sam Szafran (19 November 1934 – 14 September 2019) was a French artist. He has been buried in the cimetière parisien de Bagneux.

== Biography ==
Sam Szafran was born in Paris in 1934, a son of Polish Jewish immigrants. He grew up in the Quartier des Halles. As a child, he knew that art was what he wanted to do. During World War II he was hidden in the countryside and later in Switzerland, but returned to Paris in 1944 to live with his mother. He was captured there by the Nazis and sent to a camp in Drancy. He was freed by the Americans and then left Europe, spending four years in Australia. He returned to Paris in 1951. Following abstract beginnings at the Atelier de la Grande Chaumière, where the young artist studied under Henri Goetz, he discovered pastel in the early 1960s. During the postwar period he encountered as well Jean Arp, Yves Klein, Jean-Paul Riopelle, Joan Mitchell, Alberto Giacometti, Henri Cartier-Bresson and Martine Franck. In 1963 he married the Swiss-born Lilette Keller, and their son Sébastien was born the following year. After spending several years in studios provided by their friends, they finally moved to Malakoff in 1974.

== Artwork ==
The discovery of the pastel was of great significance to Sam Szafran. Since the beginning of the 1960s he has been using the pastel chalks of "Pastels Roché" which were fabricated based on the family recipe by the three sisters of the Roché-family at the Maison du Pastel. From now on this technique has been dominating his work either alone or in combination with charcoal or watercolor. At the same time the themes of his paintings intensified as well. The numerous series of staircases, jungle-like greenhouses and studios ("Ateliers") are the result of his obsession with mastering perfectly the somewhat anachronistic technique of pastel. By focusing on figurative themes and technical precision this kind of painting contradicts most of the abstract and gestural tendencies of contemporary art; this is an art beyond concepts, trends and ephemeral styles. As a result, the artist's work has rarely been seen in exhibitions and almost exclusively in his home country and in Switzerland.

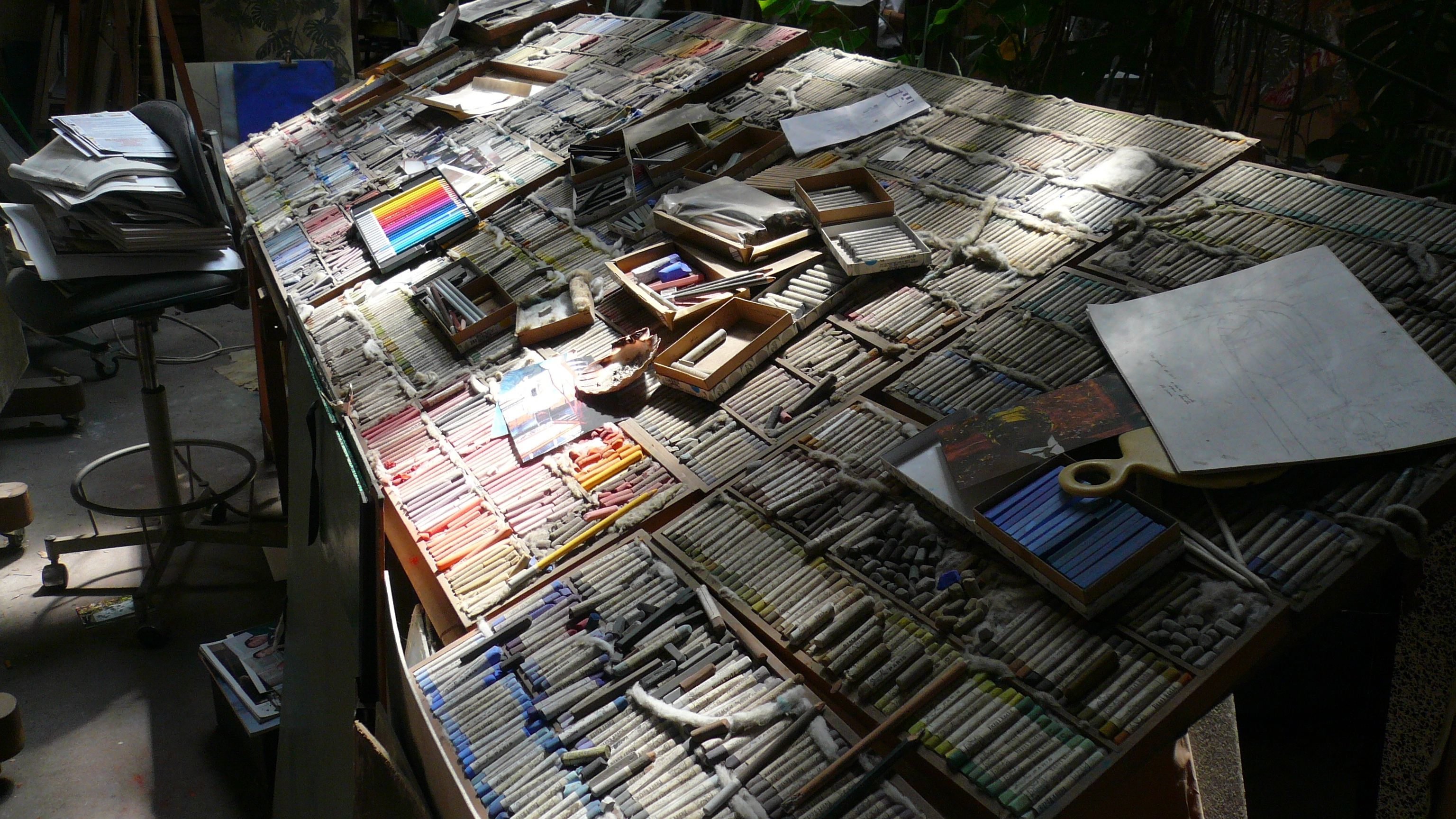
The artist's studio

In 1993, he received the Grand Prix des Arts de la Ville de Paris.

First retrospectives were organized by Jean Clair and Jean-Louis Prat in 1999 and 2000 at the Fondation Pierre Gianadda in Martigny/ Switzerland and at the Fondation Maeght in Saint-Paul-de-Vence. The first exhibition in a Paris Museum was held in 2001 at the Musée de la Vie romantique ("L'atelier dans l'atelier").

In 2008, two of his pastels were shown at the exhibition "Le mystère et l'éclat / Mystery and Glitter. Pastels from the Musée d'Orsay" at the Musée d'Orsay in Paris.

In 2011, he was awarded the 3rd Prix Piero Crommelynck.

In December 2019, Sothebys sold Szafran's Imprimerie Bellini for €876,000 from the Louis-Dreyfus Family Collection.

== Exhibitions ==
- Sam Szafran, dessins, Galerie Jacques Kerchache, Paris, 1965 (catalogue text by Pierre Schneider)
- Sam Szafran, pastels, Galerie Claude Bernard, Paris, 1972 (catalogue texts by Fouad El-Etr, Jean Paget and Georges Schéhadé)
- Sam Szafran, pastels, Galerie Artek, Geneva, 1974 (catalogue text by Fouad El-Etr)
- Sam Szafran, fusains, Galerie Claude Bernard, Paris, 1976 (catalogue text by James Lord)
- Sam Szafran, pastels, Galerie Claude Bernard, Paris, 1987 (catalogue text by Jean Clair)
- Sam Szafran, aquarelles, Galerie Claude Bernard, Paris, 1987 (catalogue text by James Lord)
- Sam Szafran, dessins & pastels, Caja Iberia, Saragosse, 1988 (catalogue texts by Orlando Pelayo, Jean-Dominique Rey and Henri Cartier-Bresson)
- Sam Szafran, aquarelles, Galerie Vallois, Paris, 1992 (catalogue text by Jean Clair)
- Sam Szafran, Fondation Pierre Gianadda, Martigny, 1999; then Fondation Maeght, Saint Paul, 11 February-30 March 2000 (catalogue text by Jean Clair)
- Sam Szafran, Musée de la Vie romantique, Hôtel Scheffer-Renan, Paris, 2001 (catalogue texts by Michel Le Bris and Daniel Marchesseau)
- The Jacques & Natasha Gelman Collection, The Met, New York 2004
- Sam Szafran, exhibition at the Pavillon des Arts et du Design, jardin des Tuileries, Galerie Hopkins & Custot, Paris, 2–6 April 2008
- Sam Szafran, "Le mystère et l'éclat", Musée d'Orsay, November 2008
- Sam Szafran – Drawings, Pastels, Watercolors, Max Ernst Museum, Brühl des LVR, 7 November 2010 – 30 January 2011 (catalogue texts in German, French and English, ed. by Julia Drost and Werner Spies, texts by Markus A. Castor, Jean Clair, Julia Drost, Daniel Marchesseau, Estelle Pietrzyk, Andreas Platthaus and Werner Spies)
- Sam Szafran, 3rd Prix Piero Crommelynck, estampes, Galerie de l'Ancien Collège, Châtellerault, June - August 2011
- Sam Szafran, Cinquante ans de peinture, par Daniel Marchesseau & al. Fondation Pierre Gianadda, Martigny, 7 December, 2012 - 16 June, 2013

== Bibliography ==
- Jean Clair, "Sam Szafran", Skira, Geneva, 1996.
- Daniel Marchesseau,"Sam Szafran, L'atelier dans l'atelier", Musée de la Vie romantique, Hôtel Scheffer-Renan, Paris, 2001
- Daniel Marchesseau, "Le Pavillon Szafran," Martigny, Fondation Pierre Gianadda, 2005.
- Daniel Marchesseau, "Henri Cartier-Bresson - La Collection Sam, Lilette et Sébastien Szafran," Martigny, Fondation Pierre Gianadda, 2005.
- "Sam Szafran – Drawings, Pastels, Watercolors", cat. ed. by Julia Drost and Werner Spies, Max Ernst Museum, Brühl des LVR, 2010, Düsseldorf: Feymedia 2010 (catalogue texts in German, French and English by Markus A. Castor, Jean Clair, Julia Drost, Daniel Marchesseau, Estelle Pietrzyk, Andreas Platthaus and Werner Spies).
- Daniel Marchesseau, "Sam Szafran, Cinquante ans de peinture," exhibition catalogue, Fondation Pierre Gianadda, Martigny, 2012
- Miranda Roman, "Une leçon pour nous tous (A lesson for us all)" in "Sam Szafran, Cinquante ans de peinture," exhibition catalogue, Fondation Pierre Gianadda, Martigny, 2012

== Filmography ==
- Sam Szafran / Outlaw Painter. Directed by Bastien Rokk. B&M Films, 2017.
