= Blanche Reverchon =

French psychoanalyst

Blanche Reverchon (16 May 1879 – 8 January 1974) was a French psychoanalyst.
