= Irene Worth =

American actress (1916–2002)

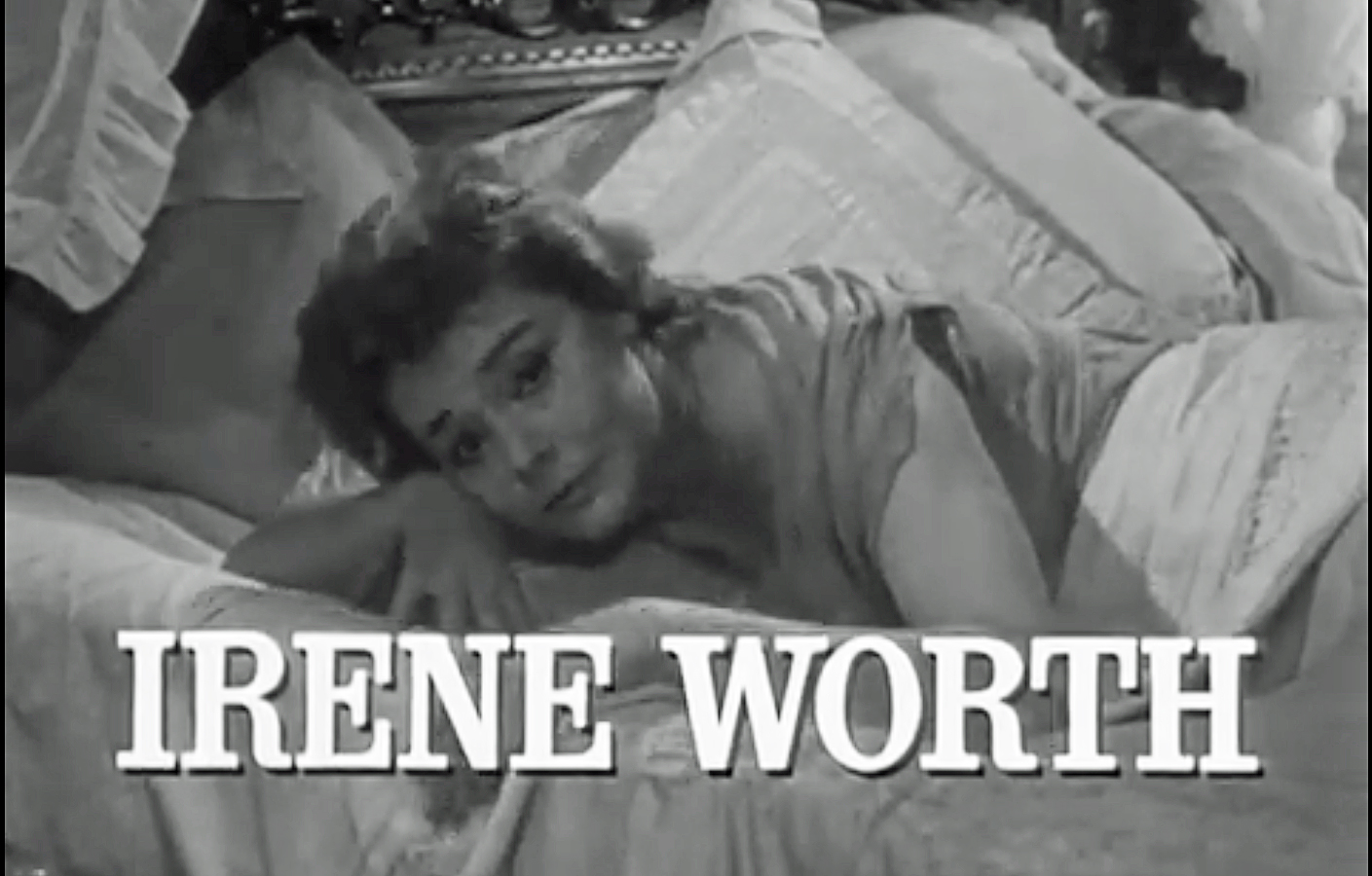
- Worth in The Scapegoat (1959)
- Born: Harriett Elizabeth Abrams; June 23, 1916; Fairbury, Nebraska, U.S.
- Died: March 10, 2002 (aged 85); New York City, U.S.
- Education: UCLA; Royal Central School of Speech and Drama
- Occupation: Actress
- Years active: 1943–2001

Irene Worth (born Harriett Elizabeth Abrams; June 23, 1916 – March 10, 2002) was an American stage and screen actress, who became one of the leading stars of the British and American theatre.

Worth made her Broadway debut in 1943, joined the Old Vic company in 1951 and the Royal Shakespeare Company in 1962. She won the BAFTA Award for Best British Actress for the 1958 film Orders to Kill. Her other film appearances included Nicholas and Alexandra (1971) and Deathtrap (1982). A three-time Tony Award winner, she won the Tony Award for Best Actress in a Play for Tiny Alice in 1965 and Sweet Bird of Youth in 1976, and won the 1991 Tony Award for Best Featured Actress in a Play for Lost in Yonkers, a role she reprised in the 1993 film version.

One of her later stage performances was opposite Paul Scofield in the 2001 production of I Take Your Hand in Mine at the Almeida Theatre in London.

== Early life ==
Harriett Elizabeth Abrams was born in Fairbury, Nebraska, the eldest of three children born to Mennonite parents, Heinrich "Henry" Abrams (who was born in Russia) and Agnes (née Thiessen) Abrams, both teachers. The family moved from Nebraska to Southern California in 1920. She was educated at Newport Harbor High School, Santa Ana Junior College, and UCLA. After graduation, she followed her parents and became a teacher, while pursuing acting. She changed her name to Irene Worth and by 1944 had settled in London, where she remained for much of her career.

== Career ==
=== United States ===
Prior to establishing herself on the West End and one year before moving to London, Worth made her Broadway debut in "The Two Mrs. Carrolls" in 1943. Despite her expansive work in the UK, she continued to perform on Broadway, and in 1960 earned her first Tony nomination for Best Actress in a Play for Toys in the Attic. Worth won her first Tony in 1965 for her work as Miss Alice in Tiny Alice (Best Actress in a Play). Along with her other Tony wins for Princess Kosmonopolis in a revival of Tennessee Williams's Sweet Bird of Youth (1976, Best Actress in a Play) and Grandma Kurnitz in Lost in Yonkers (1991, Best Featured Actress in a Play), Worth earned another nomination in 1977 for The Cherry Orchard (Best Actress in a Play).

In 1957, Worth displayed her versatility as an actress in the title role of Schiller's tragedy Mary Stuart on Broadway, co-starring Eva Le Gallienne. She also appeared in the premiere of The Lady from Dubuque, another Albee play, which closed after 12 performances; a revival of Ibsen's John Gabriel Borkman; and The Golden Age by A.R. Gurney. Toward the end of the decade she played Winnie in Beckett's Happy Days.

=== Shakespeare and the West End ===
Worth joined the Old Vic company in 1951, where she worked with Tyrone Guthrie and played the roles of Desdemona in Othello, Helena in A Midsummer Night's Dream, Portia in The Merchant of Venice and her first Lady Macbeth. The company went to South Africa with Worth as one of the leading ladies.

In 1953, she joined the fledgling Shakespeare Festival in Stratford, Ontario for its inaugural season. There she was the principal leading lady, performing under an enormous tent with Alec Guinness in All's Well That Ends Well and Richard III. Also in Stratford, she was an acclaimed Hedda Gabler, a role she considered one of her more satisfying achievements and which prompted Walter Kerr to write a glowing review of her theatrical talent in The New York Times.

Worth returned to London in N.C. Hunter's "Chekhovian" drama A Day by the Sea, with a cast that included John Gielgud and Ralph Richardson. She joined the Midland Theatre Company in Coventry for Ugo Betti's The Queen and the Rebels. Her transformation from "a rejected slut cowering at her lover's feet into a redemption of regal poise" ensured a transfer to London, where Kenneth Tynan wrote of her technique: "It is grandiose, heartfelt, marvellously controlled, clear as crystal and totally unmoving."

In the 1950s Worth played in the farce Hotel Paradiso in London with Alec Guinness. In Ivor Brown's play William's Other Anne, which she played Shakespeare's first girlfriend Anne Whateley opposite John Gregson as Shakespeare.

She also made a number of well-regarded appearances in British films of the period, most notably her powerful performance as a French Resistance agent in Anthony Asquith's 1958 wartime espionage drama Orders to Kill, which earned her the BAFTA award for Best Supporting Actress.

=== The RSC, the National Theatre and Greenwich ===
In 1962, she joined the Royal Shakespeare Company at the Aldwych Theatre, and it was there that she gave some of her great performances. She was Goneril to Paul Scofield's Lear in Peter Brook's acclaimed King Lear, the first of many collaborations with Brook. She recreated her implacable Goneril in the stark, black-and-white film version of this production.

She repeated her Lady Macbeth and appeared again for Brook in Friedrich Dürrenmatt's The Physicists. Playing an asylum superintendent, she showed the darker side of her acting. Following work on Broadway, she returned to the RSC at the Aldwych to repeat her role. She worked with Peter Brook in Paris on Orghast, Brook's attempt to develop an international theatre language, which was staged in two parts in Persepolis and Naqsh-e Rostam at the Shiraz Arts Festival in 1971. She joined the National Theatre at the Old Vic in 1968 to play Jocasta in Peter Brook's production of Seneca's Oedipus, opposite Gielgud. She appeared with Sir Noël Coward's in his trilogy, Suite in Three Keys, in which he made his last on-stage appearance.

In 1974, she appeared in three thematically linked plays at the Greenwich Theatre directed by Jonathan Miller under the umbrella title of Family Romances and using the same actors for each play. Worth took the roles of Gertrude in Hamlet, Madame Arkadina in Chekhov's The Seagull, and Mrs Alving in Ibsen's Ghosts.

=== The later years ===
She starred as the goddess Athena in The National Radio Theater's 1981 Peabody Award-winning radio drama of The Odyssey of Homer. On screen in 1982, Worth co-starred with Michael Caine and Christopher Reeve in the film version of a Broadway murder mystery Deathtrap, playing a psychic.

In 1984, Sir Peter Hall invited her to return to the National Theatre to play Volumnia in Coriolanus, with Sir Ian McKellen in the title role. The impresario Joseph Papp persuaded her to repeat Volumnia off-Broadway in a production by Steven Berkoff, when she again was partnered by Christopher Walken as Coriolanus.

She was seen in Sir David Hare's The Bay at Nice (National, 1987), for which she was nominated for the Laurence Olivier Award for Actress of the Year. She then appeared in Chère Maître (New York, 1998 and Almeida, London 1999), compiled by Peter Eyre from the letters of George Sand and Gustave Flaubert. Worth also starred along with Sir Michael Hordern in George Bernard Shaw's play You Never Can Tell at the Theatre Royal, Haymarket in 1987 and 1988.

In 1991, she won a third Tony for her performance as the tough-as-nails Grandma Kurnitz in Neil Simon's Lost in Yonkers, and later appeared in the film version along with Richard Dreyfuss and Mercedes Ruehl.

In 1999, she appeared in the film Onegin. As she was about to begin preview performances in a Broadway revival of Anouilh's Ring Round the Moon, Worth had a stroke and never appeared in the production. She continued to act, and in September 2001, one of her later appearances was with Paul Scofield at the Almeida Theatre in the two-handed play I Take Your Hand in Mine, by Carol Rocamora based on the love letters of Anton Chekhov and Olga Knipper.

=== Recitals ===
During the mid-1960s in New York, Worth and Gielgud had collaborated in a series of dramatic readings, first from T.S. Eliot and Edith Sitwell and then from Shakespeare. It was a form of theatre at which she became more adept as she grew older, drawing from Virginia Woolf, Ivan Turgenev and Noël Coward. She referred to them as "her recitals".

In the mid-1990s, she devised and performed a two-hour monologue Portrait of Edith Wharton, based on Wharton's life and writings. Using no props, costumes or sets, she created characters entirely through vocal means.

== Death and funeral ==
Worth died following a stroke in 2002, in New York's Roosevelt Hospital, at the age of 85.

At her memorial service, held at the Public Theater in New York City, numerous speakers paid tribute to her, including Edward Albee, Christopher Walken, Mercedes Ruehl, Gene Saks, Meryl Streep, Bernard Gersten, and Alan Rickman. Pianist Horacio Gutierrez performed Liszt’s Sonetto 104 del Petrarca.

== Accolades and honors ==
=== Awards ===
- Daily Mail Television Award The Lady from the Sea, 1953-54
- British Academy Film Award for Best British Actress, Orders to Kill 1958
- Page One Award, Toys in the Attic 1960
- Tony Award for Best Actress (Dramatic), Tiny Alice 1965
- Evening Standard Theatre Award for Best Actress, Suite in Three Keys 1966
- Variety Club of Great Britain Award, Heartbreak House 1967
- Plays and Players London Theatre Critics Award Best Actress, Heartbreak House 1967
- Tony Award for Best Actress, Sweet Bird of Youth 1975-76
- Joseph Jefferson Award Best Actress in a Play, Sweet Bird of Youth 1975-76
- Drama Desk Award for Outstanding Actress, The Cherry Orchard 1977
- OBIE Award, The Chalk Garden 1981-82
- Emmy Award, "Live From Lincoln Center: Chamber Music Society of Lincoln Center with Irene Worth and Horacio Gutiérrez" 1986
- OBIE Award, Sustained Achievement 1988-89
- Tony Award for Best Featured Actress, Lost in Yonkers 1991
- Drama Desk Award for Outstanding Featured Actress, Lost in Yonkers 1991

=== Honors ===
Worth was awarded an honorary Commander of the Order of the British Empire (CBE) in 1975.

== Filmography ==
Year	Title	Role	Notes
1948	One Night with You	Lina Linari	Film debut
1948	Another Shore	Bucksie Vere-Brown	
1952	Secret People	Miss Jackson	
1958	Orders to Kill	Léonie	
1959	The Scapegoat	Francoise	
1962	Seven Seas to Calais	Queen Elizabeth I	
1963	To Die in Madrid	Co-Narrator	Documentary
1971	King Lear	Goneril	
1971	Nicholas and Alexandra	The Dowager Empress Marie Fedorovna	
1979	Rich Kids	Madeline's Mother	
1980	Happy Days	Winnie	TV Movie
1981	Eyewitness	Mrs. Sokolow	
1982	Deathtrap	Helga ten Dorp	
1983	Separate Tables	Mrs. Railton-Bell	TV Movie
1984	The Tragedy of Coriolanus	Volumnia	TV Movie
1984	Forbidden	Ruth Friedländer	
1985	Fast Forward	Ida Sabol	
1989	The Shell Seekers	Dolly Keeling	TV Movie
1993	Lost in Yonkers	Grandma Kurnitz	
1998	Just the Ticket	Mrs. Haywood	
1999	Onegin	Princess Alina	Final film role
