= Vivian Matalon =

British theatre director (1929–2018)

- Born: 11 October 1929; Manchester, England
- Died: 15 August 2018 (aged 88)
- Occupation: Theatre director

Vivian Matalon (11 October 1929 – 15 August 2018) was a British theatre director.

Born in Manchester, Matalon began his career as an actor in a series of forgettable British films, but his greatest success was as a director of West End, Broadway and regional theatre productions. His West End credits include Bus Stop with Lee Remick and Keir Dullea, I Never Sang for My Father with Raymond Massey and The Glass Menagerie with Anna Massey. He was artistic director for three years at the Hampstead Theatre, where his productions included Clifford Odets' Awake and Sing and the European premiere of Small Craft Warnings by Tennessee Williams.

Matalon served on the Artistic Advisory Board of New York City's New World's Theatre Project, which makes late 19th and early 20th century Yiddish plays accessible to contemporary audiences in modern English translations.

He died from complications of diabetes in August 2018, at the age of 88.

== Filmography ==
- The Weapon (1956) - Private (uncredited)
- Fire Down Below (1957) - 1st U.S. Sailor
- Subway in the Sky (1959) - Stefan Grant
- Too Young to Love (1960) - Larry Webster
- Crack in the Mirror (1960) - Young man at Buvette
- King and Country (1964) - Padre

== Stage productions ==
- After the Rain (1967)
- Noël Coward in Two Keys (1974)
- P. S. Your Cat Is Dead! (1975)
- Morning's at Seven (1980 revival)
- Brigadoon (1980 revival)
- The American Clock (1980)
- The Corn Is Green (1983 revival)
- The Tap Dance Kid (1983)
- Souvenir (2005)

== Awards and nominations ==
Awards

- 1980: Tony Award for Best Direction of a Play – Morning's at Seven
- 1980: Drama Desk Award Outstanding Director of a Play – Morning's at Seven

Nominations

- 1984: Tony Award for Best Direction of a Musical – The Tap Dance Kid
