= 1988 in literature =

This article contains information about the literary events and publications of 1988.

== Events ==
- March 7 – 1988 Writers Guild of America strike: Nine thousand movie and television writers of the Writers' Guild of America go on strike a day after rejecting a final offer from producers.
- May 28–31 – The first Hay Festival of literature is held in the Welsh Marches.
- June – The Panasonic Globe Theatre, Tokyo, opens with an Ingmar Bergman production of Shakespeare's Hamlet.
- August 7 – The Writers Guild of America strike formally ends.
- November 15 – Copyright, Designs and Patents Act 1988 reforms copyright law in the United Kingdom, with special provision for Great Ormond Street Hospital for sick children to benefit in perpetuity from royalties in J. M. Barrie's 1904 play Peter Pan, or The Boy Who Wouldn't Grow Up.
- unknown date – Vasily Grossman's 1960 novel Life and Fate (Жизнь и судьба) is published for the first time in the Soviet Union, in the magazine Oktyabr.

== New books ==
=== Fiction ===
- Caio Fernando Abreu – Os dragões não conhecem o paraíso (Dragons, short stories)
- Margaret Atwood – Cat's Eye
- Bernardo Atxaga – Obabakoak (short stories)
- J. G. Ballard
  - Memories of the Space Age
  - Running Wild
- Iain M. Banks – The Player of Games
- Clive Barker
  - Cabal
  - The Hellbound Heart
- Thomas Berger – The Houseguest
- Michael Blake – Dances with Wolves
- Dionne Brand – Sans Souci and Other Stories
- Ray Bradbury – The Toynbee Convector (short story)
- Orson Scott Card – Treason
- Peter Carey – Oscar and Lucinda
- Roger Caron – Jojo
- Raymond Carver – Where I'm Calling From: New and Selected Stories
- Michael Chabon – The Mysteries of Pittsburgh
- Tom Clancy – The Cardinal of the Kremlin
- Paulo Coelho – The Alchemist
- Hugh Cook – The Walrus and the Warwolf
- Bernard Cornwell
  - Sharpe's Rifles
  - Wildtrack
- Jim Crace – The Gift of Stones
- Tsitsi Dangarembga – Nervous Conditions
- Robertson Davies – The Lyre of Orpheus
- L. Sprague de Camp and Catherine Crook de Camp – The Stones of Nomuru
- Don DeLillo – Libra
- Dương Thu Hương – Paradise of the Blind (Những thiên đường mù)
- Allan W. Eckert – The Dark Green Tunnel
- Umberto Eco – Foucault's Pendulum (Il pendolo di Foucault)
- John Gardner – Scorpius
- Thomas Harris – The Silence of the Lambs
- Joseph Heller – Picture This
- Alan Hollinghurst – The Swimming Pool Library
- William Horwood – Dunction Quest
- Hamid Ismailov – Собрание Утончённых (Conference of the Refined)
- Judith Krantz – 'Til We Meet Again
- Ágota Kristóf – The Proof
- Doris Lessing – The Fifth Child
- Bernard-Henri Lévy – Les Derniers Jours de Charles Baudelaire
- Robert Ludlum – The Icarus Agenda
- Javier Marías – Todas las almas (All Souls)
- David Markson – Wittgenstein's Mistress
- James A. Michener – Alaska
- Robert B. Parker – Crimson Joy
- Belva Plain – Tapestry
- Ellis Peters
  - The Confession of Brother Haluin
  - A Rare Benedictine: The Advent of Brother Cadfael
- Richard Powers – Prisoner's Dilemma
- Tim Powers – On Stranger Tides
- Terry Pratchett
  - Sourcery
  - Wyrd Sisters
- Christoph Ransmayr – The Last World
- Jean Raspail – Blue Island
- Alina Reyes – The Butcher
- David Adams Richards – Nights Below Station Street
- Salman Rushdie – The Satanic Verses
- Richard Russo – The Risk Pool
- R. A. Salvatore – The Crystal Shard (first of The Icewind Dale Trilogy)
- Sidney Sheldon – The Sands of Time
- Clark Ashton Smith – A Rendezvous in Averoigne
- Danielle Steel – Zoya
- Thomas Sullivan – The Phases of Harry Moon
- Julian Symons – The Kentish Manor Murders
- Christopher Tolkien (with J. R. R. Tolkien and Alan Lee) – The Return of the Shadow
- Nikolai Tolstoy – The Coming of the King
- Anne Tyler – Breathing Lessons
- Andrew Vachss – Blue Belle
- Mario Vargas Llosa – In Praise of the Stepmother (Elogio de la madrastra)
- Banana Yoshimoto – Kitchen

=== Children and young people ===
- Chris Van Allsburg – Two Bad Ants
- Martin Auer – Now, Now, Markus (Bimbo und sein Vogel)
- Lyll Becerra de Jenkins – The Honorable Prison
- Roald Dahl – Matilda
- Janice Elliott – The Empty Throne (second in The Sword and the Dream series)
- Virginia Hamilton (with Barry Moser) – In the Beginning: Creation Stories from Around the World
- William Joyce – Robots
- Elizabeth Laird – Red Sky in the Morning (also as Loving Ben)
- Geraldine McCaughrean – A Pack of Lies
- Patricia McKissack – Mirandy and Brother Wind
- Beatrice Schenk de Regniers (with Eva Moore et al.) – Sing a Song of Popcorn: Every Child's Book of Poems
- P. L. Travers – Mary Poppins and the House Next Door
- Manuel Vázquez Montalbán (with Willi Glasauer) – Escenas de la Literatura Universal y Retratos de Grandes Autores (Scenes from World Literature and Portraits of Greatest Authors)

=== Drama ===
- Alan Bennett – Single Spies (stage versions of An Englishman Abroad and A Question of Attribution)
- Thomas Bernhard – Heldenplatz
- David Henry Hwang – M. Butterfly
- Ann-Marie MacDonald – Goodnight Desdemona (Good Morning Juliet)
- Peter Shaffer – Lettice and Lovage
- Tom Stoppard – Hapgood
- Botho Strauß – Seven Doors (Sieben Türen)

=== Poetry ===
- Giannina Braschi – El imperio de los sueños (Empire of Dreams)
- James Merrill – The Inner Room
- Grazyna Miller – "Curriculum"

=== Non-fiction ===
- Peter A. Clayton and Martin Price – The Seven Wonders of the Ancient World
- David Herbert Donald – Look Homeward: A Life of Thomas Wolfe
- Albert Goldman – The Lives of John Lennon
- Sita Ram Goel – Catholic Ashrams
- Suzette Haden Elgin – A First Dictionary & Grammar of Láadan
- Stephen Hawking – A Brief History of Time
- Michael Jackson – Moonwalk
- Chris Killip with John Berger and Sylvia Grant – In Flagrante
- K. S. Lal – The Mughal Harem
- Patrick Macnee and Marie Cameron – Blind in One Ear: The Avenger Returns (Macnee's autobiography)
- Michel Maffesoli – The Time of the Tribes (Le Temps des tribus)
- Lou Mollgaard – Kiki: Reine de la Montparnasse
- Rosalind Miles – The Women's History of the World
- Alanna Nash – Golden Girl: The Story of Jessica Savitch
- Lady Violet Powell – The Life of a Provincial Lady: A Study of E. M. Delafield and Her Works
- Philip Roth – The Facts: A Novelist's Autobiography
- Miranda Seymour – A Ring of Conspirators: Henry James and his Literary Circle, 1895–1915
- Joe Simpson – Touching the Void
- William L. Sullivan – Listening for Coyote
- Frédéric Vitoux – Céline: A Biography (La Vie de Céline)
- Edgar C. Whisenant – 88 Reasons Why the Rapture Will Be in 1988

== Births ==
- January 28 – Pierce Brown, American science-fiction writer
- May 18 – Luu Quang Minh, Vietnamese writer and singer
- August 19 – Veronica Roth, American young-adult novelist and short story writer
- September 10 – Dominika Słowik, Polish writer
- October 14 – Ocean Vuong, Vietnamese-American poet
- November 9 – Tahereh Mafi, American young-adult novelist
- unknown date – Fiona Mozley, English novelist and medievalist

== Deaths ==
- January 6 – L. P. Davies, English novelist (born 1914)
- February 1 – Gerald Butler, English crime writer (born 1907)
- February 3 – Robert Duncan, American poet (born 1919)
- February 6 – Marghanita Laski, English biographer, novelist and broadcaster (born 1915)
- February 27 – Basil Boothroyd, English poet and humorist (born 1910)
- February 28 – Kylie Tennant, Australian novelist, playwright and historian (born 1912)
- March 11 – Christianna Brand (Mary Christianna Lewis), British crime novelist (born 1907)
- March 19 – Máirtín Ó Direáin, Irish-language poet (born 1910)
- April 12 – Alan Paton, South African novelist and political activist (born 1903)
- April 15 – Modest Morariu, Romanian poet, essayist, prose writer and translator (born 1929)
- April 21 – I. A. L. Diamond, Bessarabian-born American comedy writer (born 1920)
- May 3 – Premendra Mitra, Bengali poet, novelist and short story writer (born 1904)
- May 8 – Robert A. Heinlein, American science fiction writer (born 1907)
- May 10 – Shen Congwen, Chinese writer (born 1902)
- May 23 – Aya Kitō, Japanese diarist (born 1962)
- June 6 – Gheorghe Eminescu, Romanian historian and memoirist (lung disease, born 1890)
- June 10 – Louis L'Amour, American western novelist (born 1908)
- June 21 – George Ivașcu, Romanian journalist, literary critic, and communist militant (born 1911)
- July 10
  - Noel Barber, British novelist (born 1909)
  - Enrique Lihn, Chilean poet, playwright, and novelist (cancer, born 1929)
- July 12 – Joshua Logan, American stage and film writer (born 1908)
- August 2 – Raymond Carver, American short-story writer and poet (born 1938)
- August 20 – Joan G. Robinson, English children's writer and illustrator (born 1910)
- August 23 – Menotti Del Picchia, Brazilian poet, journalist and painter (born 1892)
- August 28 – Max Shulman, American novelist, short-story writer and dramatist (born 1919)
- September 11 – Roger Hargreaves, English children's author and illustrator (born 1935)
- September 28 – Charles Addams, American cartoonist (born 1912)
- October 1 – Sacheverell Sitwell, English writer and art critic (born 1897)
- October 10 – Bhabani Bhattacharya, Indian fiction writer (born 1906)
- October 12 – Ruth Manning-Sanders, British children's author (born 1895)
- October 16
  - John Gwilym Jones, Welsh dramatist and writer (born 1904)
  - Christian Matras, Faroese poet (born 1900)
- November 2 – Stewart Parker, Northern Irish poet and playwright (cancer, born 1941)
- November 8 – Hamad al-Hajji, Saudi Arabian poet (born 1939)
- November 9 – Rosemary Timperley, British novelist (born 1920)
- December 11 – Thomas Owen Beachcroft, English novelist (born 1902)
- December 16 – Frank Bonham, American western and young adult novelist (born 1914)

== Awards ==
- Nobel Prize for Literature: Naguib Mahfouz

=== Australia ===
- The Australian/Vogel Literary Award: Tom Flood, Oceana Fine
- C. J. Dennis Prize for Poetry: Judith Beveridge, The Domesticity of Giraffes
- Kenneth Slessor Prize for Poetry: Judith Beveridge, The Domesticity of Giraffes
- Mary Gilmore Prize: Judith Beveridge, The Domesticity of Giraffes
- Miles Franklin Award: No award presented

=== Canada ===
- See 1988 Governor General's Awards for a complete list of winners and finalists for those awards.

=== France ===
- Grand Prix de Littérature Policière International: Andrew Vachss, Strega
- Prix Goncourt: Érik Orsenna, L'Exposition coloniale
- Prix Médicis French: Christiane Rochefort, La Porte du fond
- Prix Médicis International: Thomas Bernhard, les Maîtres anciens

=== United Kingdom ===
- Booker Prize: Peter Carey, Oscar and Lucinda
- Carnegie Medal for children's literature: Geraldine McCaughrean, A Pack of Lies
- Cholmondeley Award: John Heath-Stubbs, Sean O'Brien, John Whitworth
- Eric Gregory Award: Michael Symmons Roberts, Gwyneth Lewis, Adrian Blackledge, Simon Armitage, Robert Crawford
- James Tait Black Memorial Prize for fiction: Piers Paul Read, A Season in the West
- James Tait Black Memorial Prize for biography: Brian McGuinness, Wittgenstein, A Life: Young Ludwig (1889–1921)
- Queen's Gold Medal for Poetry: Derek Walcott
- Whitbread Best Book Award: Paul Sayer, The Comforts of Madness
- The Sunday Express Book of the Year: David Lodge, Nice Work

=== United States ===
- Agnes Lynch Starrett Poetry Prize: Maxine Scates, Toluca Street
- Aiken Taylor Award for Modern American Poetry: Richard Wilbur
- Frost Medal: Carolyn Kizer
- National Book Award for Fiction: Pete Dexter, Paris Trout
- National Book Critics Circle: Bharati Mukherjee, The Middleman and Other Stories
- Nebula Award: Lois McMaster Bujold, Falling Free
- Newbery Medal for children's literature: Russell Freedman, Lincoln: A Photobiography
- PEN/Faulkner Award for Fiction: T. Coraghessan Boyle, World's End
- Pulitzer Prize for Drama: Alfred Uhry, Driving Miss Daisy
- Pulitzer Prize for Fiction: Toni Morrison, Beloved
- Pulitzer Prize for Poetry: William Meredith: Partial Accounts: New and Selected Poems
- Whiting Awards: Fiction: Lydia Davis, Bruce Duffy, Jonathan Franzen, Mary La Chapelle, William T. Vollmann. Nonfiction: Gerald Early, Geoffrey O'Brien. Poetry: Michael Burkard, Li-Young Lee, Sylvia Moss

=== Spain ===
- Premio Nadal: Juan Pedro Aparicio, Retratos de ambigú

=== Elsewhere ===
- Friedenspreis des Deutschen Buchhandels: Siegfried Lenz
