= Mulligan Stew (novel) =

Novel by Gilbert Sorrentino

- Cover to first edition hardback/paperback
- Author: Gilbert Sorrentino
- Cover artist: Kenneth R. Deardoff
- Language: English
- Genre: Fiction, metafiction
- Published: 1979 (Grove Press)
- Publication place: United States
- Media type: Print (Hardback, Paperback)
- ISBN: 0-394-50717-7 (hc); 0-394-17086-5 (pb)

Mulligan Stew is a postmodern novel by Gilbert Sorrentino. It was first published in 1979 by Grove Press, simultaneously in hardcover and softcover.

The book is a metafictional and parodistic examination of the creative process of writing a novel and its failing. It is dedicated to Brian O'Nolan and his "virtue hilaritas". The title is a direct reference to the hodge-podge nature of the food. More cryptically, it is a punning allusion ("Mulligan's too") to the character Buck Mulligan in James Joyce's Ulysses.

== Prepublication ==
Sorrentino began the novel in November 1971 and finished it in February 1975. At the time it was titled Synthetic Ink. His agent shopped it out, unsuccessfully. The novel received nearly thirty rejections. Most publishers praised the novel, often extravagantly, but because of its great length and avant-garde nature it would be too expensive a loss.

Eventually, in 1978, Grove Press accepted the book, subject to three demands. Barney Rosset wanted a different title, and got it. Rosset wanted the rejection letters to be published as part of the book, and Sorrentino agreed, although he supplied parody versions. Rosset wanted the Masque of Fungo section deleted, Sorrentino refused, and Rosset conceded.

== Release details ==
Several excerpts and chapters had been published independently in literary magazines since 1973. Flawless Play Restored: The Masque of Fungo was published separately in a hardcover signed edition and a paperback, by Black Sparrow Press, 16 December 1974.

=== United States ===
- 1979, Grove Press, First edition, Pub date 26 May 1979:

- Hardcover, ISBN 0-394-50717-7, 2000 copies, first printing, 2000 copies, second printing
- Softcover, ISBN 0-394-17086-5, 8000 copies, first printing, 7000 copies, second printing (Grove), 3000 copies, (Quality Paperback Book Club)

- 1987, Grove Press, Second edition, Pub July 1989

- In 1985, after the first edition went out of print, Grove Press declined to reprint the novel and the rights reverted to Sorrentino, whose agent shopped the novel around for a further printing. Grove Press ended up accepting the reissue, but with delays.

- 1996, Dalkey Archive Press ISBN 1-56478-087-2, Pub date January 1996, Softcover.
- 2023, Dalkey Archive Press ISBN 1-62897-448-6, Pub date November 2023, Paperback.

=== United Kingdom ===
Marion Boyars had initially rejected Mulligan Stew unread as being too physically large, but changed her mind upon reading the book.

- 1980, Marion Boyars, First edition, Pub April 1980
- 1981, Marion Boyars, First paperback edition, June 1981
- 1981, Pan/Picador, Second paperback edition, August 1981

- Rights reverted to Marion Boyars in 1985.

=== France ===
- 2006, Cent pages ISBN 2-906724-92-0, Pub date 15 Sept 2006. Translated by Bernard Hœpffner with Catherine Goffaux as Salmigondis.

== Plot summary ==
The book is a multi-layered novel-in novel. Starting even before the front matter a letter exchange between editors and Sorrentino is presented expressing their reasons for rejecting the novel. The novel itself consists of three main layers, namely the comments, notes and letters of the fictitious author, Antony Lamont, as he develops and writes his novel initially called “Guinea Red” and later titled “Crocodile Tears”, various chapters of Lamont’s novel with Martin Halpin as the protagonist all stylistically different, and the comments of Halpin himself who is the main “actor” of Lamont’s novel. Other matter is interspersed such as advertisement, erotic poems for Lamont to review, a masque play, and an academic-type manuscript concerning a mathematical proof. As part of the "stew" the novel contains intentionally "bad writing".

In Lamont’s novel Halpin believes that he has killed his friend and business partner Ned Beaumont. Beaumont had a love affair with Daisy Buchanan who is married to Tom Buchanan and also became a love interest of Halpin. Beaumont, however, had fallen under the seductive spell of two other women who went on exploiting him, and Halpin’s efforts to “rescue” had been futile.

As Lamont develops his novel he seeks unsuccessfully the support of his ex-wife Joanne and his sister, Sheila Lamont, who is married to Dermot Trellis, writer of “The Red Swan”. Lamont despises the more successful brother-in-law in part because he believes he writes with a commercial interest in mind. He is furious when the Midwestern Associate Professor Roche prefers his work over Lamont’s for his course. He tries unsuccessfully to seduce a poet who has sent him erotic material. Under the impression that there is a conspiracy against him he schemes on how to publish his novel.

Halpin and Beaumont have a life of their own, outside of Lamont’s novel and unbeknownst to him. They complain about their work, the shabby dialogue, the degradations and the incomplete scenery, and meet other characters who also complain about their writers, notably the clichés they are exposed to.

As Lamont is developing his novel, he becomes more and more pretentious and delusional, his support systems fail, and the “story” gets out of hand. As he loses direction and control, Halpin fears he even may have died. Eventually his characters leave him and Halpin runs off, - Beaumont, too, provided he is "alive".

== Intertextual allusions ==
The concept that characters have a life of their own is seen in the work of Brian O’Nolan to whom the book is dedicated. Thus characters of Mulligan Stew have links to other works, among them:

- Antony Lamont, Sheila Lamont, Dermot Trellis in At Swim-Two-Birds by Brian O’Nolan
- Daisy and Tom Buchanan in The Great Gatsby by Scott Fitzgerald
- Martin Halpin, Corrie Corriendo and Berthe Delamode in James Joyce's Finnegans Wake
- Ned Beaumont in The Glass Key by Dashiell Hammett

== Critical commentary ==
According to John Wells, writing for the journal Critique: Studies in Contemporary Fiction "... Gilbert Sorrentino's novel Mulligan Stew declares an end to modernism and reactivates the concept of modernism through parody, which Fredric Jameson has deemed impossible in postmodern culture. This essay demonstrates that Sorrentino's negation of modernist tropes enables readers to relearn what those tropes are and how literary montage compels readers to undergo a mimetic experience and consequently understand that which cannot be reduced to a determinate concept."

== Reviews ==
Mulligan Stew was widely reviewed on first publication. McPherson quotes excerpts from 72 reviews. According to the New York Times Mulligan Stew was Sorrentino's commercially most successful novel and named one of the best books of 1979 by the New York Times Book Review.

== See also ==
- Little Casino by Gilbert Sorrentino
- This Is Not a Novel by David Markson
