= Mu'ammarid Imamate =

1818–1820 emirate in the Arabian Peninsula

Mu'ammarid Imamate إمارة إبن معمر (Arabic)
- 1818–1820
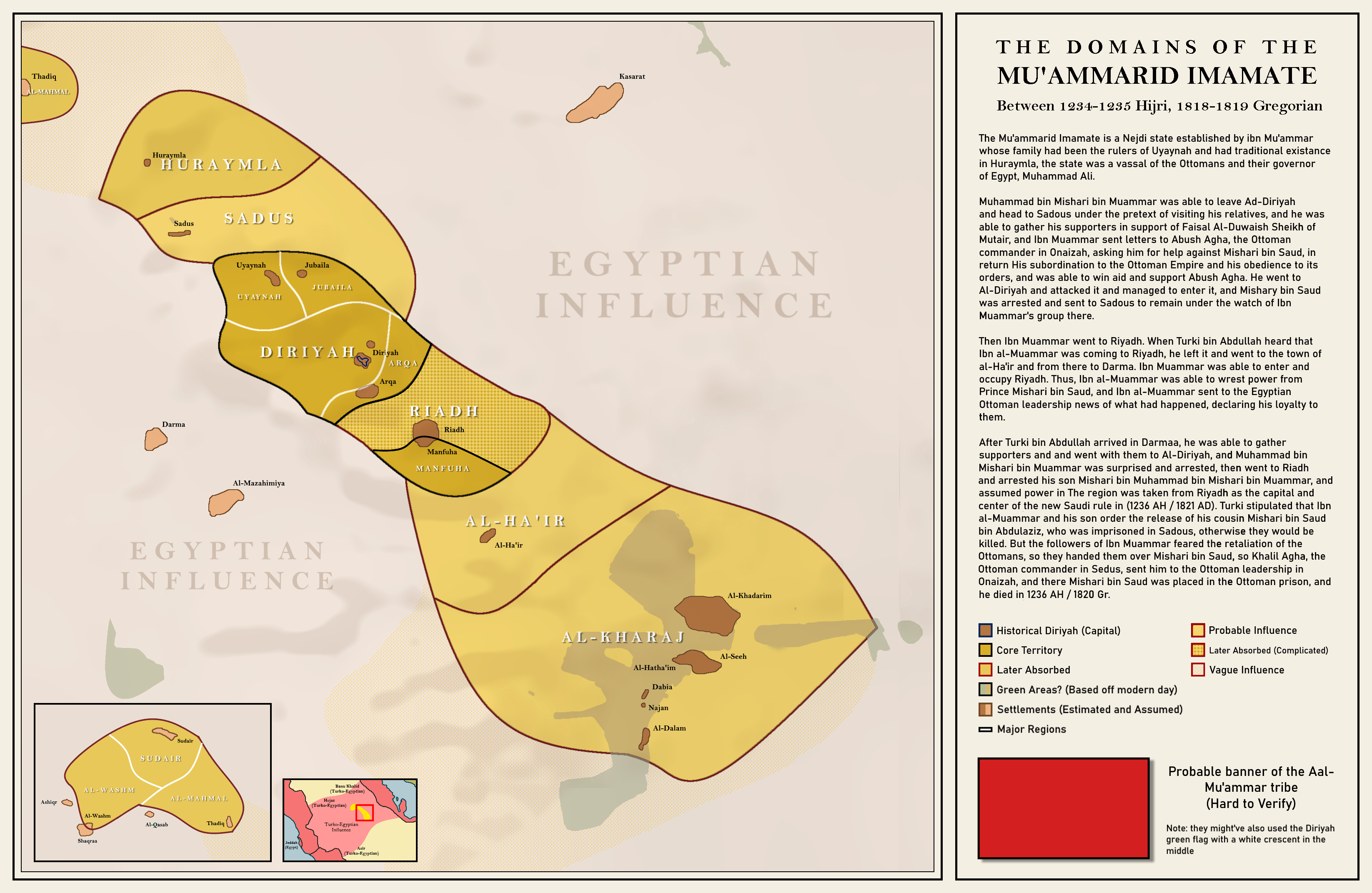
- Status: Nominal vassal of Ottoman Egypt
- Capital: Diriyah
- History
  - Established: 1818
  - Disestablished: 1820
| Preceded by | Succeeded by |
| First Saudi state | Second Saudi state |
- Today part of: Saudi Arabia

The Mu'ammarid Imamate, also referred to as ibn Muammar's Imamate or Imamate of Diriyah, was a short-lived emirate created after the fall of the first Saudi state. It was based around the city of Diriyah and was briefly a vassal of Muhammad Ali, Ottoman governor of Egypt. The state did not last long as it was reconquered by the Saudis and incorporated into the Second Saudi State.

== Background ==
When the Saudi government practically collapsed and after the fall of Dir'iya and the surrender of its leaders, the political unity formed by the reformist call faded, and Najd returned to chaos and disintegration in the form of independent entities. Some of the anti-Diriyah leadership elements returned to their countries, where they sought to regain their influence at the expense of existing leaders, and some of them succeeded in achieving this: Rashid bin Sulaiman al-Hujailan killed Abdullah bin Hujailan bin Hamad in Buraidah in revenge for his father, who was killed by Hujailan bin Hamad during the campaign of Saadoun bin Urayer on Buraidah in 1782.

In Huraymla, the conflict between the Al Hamad family and the Rashid family over the leadership of the country returned, and the leader of the Al Hamad family, Ibrahim bin Nasser Al Zeer Al Hamad, was killed by Nasser bin Mohammed bin Nasser Al Rashid, and he and his family seized the property of the Al Hamad family in Haremla and expelled them from it.

These conflicts also appeared in Al-Kharj, Al-Ahsa, Sedir, and other countries that were under the influence of Diriyah, and the Badia tribes, in the absence of a strong central authority, returned to the practice of looting, plundering, road blocking, and mutual raids between them.

The economic situation was no better, as trade between the Najd countries and with neighboring regions stopped due to insecurity and property looting by some soldiers of the invading armies and taxes that were imposed. Agricultural and animal production decreased as a result of a drought that prevailed in the region, which led to famine. The continuation of the political vacuum in Najd threatened security and created social, religious, and economic risks.

== History of the emirate ==
=== Rise of Ibn Mu'ammar ===
A unique local attempt was made to fill the political vacuum that occurred following the withdrawal of Ibrahim Pasha's forces from Najd by Muhammad bin Mishari bin Muammar, one of the prominent Najdi leaders and son of Mishari bin Muammar, the Emir of Uyaynah, and a descendant of one of the Najd families with an influential role in Najd before and during the reform call. One of the contributors to the defense of Diriyah when Ibrahim Pasha besieged it, he is one of the three notables of Diriyah who were assigned to negotiate with Ibrahim Pasha to reach a peace agreement, as that was on the seventh of Dhu al-Qi'dah in 1233 AH. He is also linked to the tribe of Imam Muhammad bin Saud by kinship, as his maternal uncle is Imam Abdul Aziz and his brother Abdullah.

In addition to that, Muhammad bin Mushari was very rich, Ibn Bishr said about him: “He had countless wealth and weapons.” An Ottoman document indicates that he possessed weapons and took out two cannons that he had buried in Diriyah during Ibrahim Pasha's siege of the city before it fell. Muhammad tried to unify Najd on the basis of the reformist call, and one of the Ottoman documents indicates that Muhammad bin Muammar, upon the start of his movement, moved his family and children to the land of Sadous where his brother Ibrahim's sons reside, an indication of his feelings of the difficulty and danger of his attempt. When he went to Riyadh, he agreed with some of the displaced from Ad Diriyah and with residents of Riyadh and his villages to support him, and put a banner at his door, and the people of Diriyah flocked to him, and gathered their children and families there, directing them to Diriyah where they began cultivating its land. This is the first step in the efforts of Muhammad bin Muammar in building a new state where he moved to and persuaded others to return to Diriyah, and helped the people with the necessary funds by depending on his vast wealth and using that wealth to secure protection for them.

This early information about Ibn Muammar's rule is identical with the context of the events, and it does not contradict the fact that he lived in Riyadh for a limited period and called on the people to return to Diriyah, with the governor of Riyadh opposing his movement after that, and its emir refused to join him.

When Sadleir spoke about Al-Diriyah during his passage in August 1819 AD corresponding to Shawwal 1234 AH, he mentioned that it is a ruined town, only its ruins remain, and there was no human being in it. His passage through Diriyah was shortly before the emergence of Muhammad bin Muammar, and the status of Diriyah made Ibn Muammar's task of rebuilding very difficult, and whatever that may be, Ibn Muammar moved to Diriyah and sought to repair the walls, houses, and castles destroyed by Ibrahim Pasha's forces, at his expense. When Ibn Bishr spoke of these efforts of Ibn Muammar, he said: When he came to the country of Diriyah, he sought to build it and showed re-invitation, and wanted to have the countries of Najd under his hand under the pretext of the imamate, so he wrote the countries and invited them with delegations to him and the meeting, so the people of a few countries obeyed him, and they dispatched to him in Diriyah, so he settled there and stayed in it.

Ottoman documents on his efforts indicated that he had begun building castles in Diriyah, and Muhammad Ali Pasha expressed his fear of Ibn Muammar's movement and asked for help from the Ottoman Sultan to suppress it, and it appears that Muhammad Ali and the Ottoman Empire did not want any regional power in this spot.

Ibn Muammar's efforts succeeded in rebuilding Diriyah again, as he was able to return a large part of its population, including a thousand and two hundred fighters. After restoring stability in Dir'iya, he began the other step in his rule: to contact the Najd countries and invite their leaders to pledge allegiance to him. The first to pledge allegiance to him came from the countries Manfouha, and he corresponded with him Some people of countries pledging allegiance.

And he achieved some success, which frightened the leaders of some countries from the expansion of his influence, and thus his threat to their countries, and these countries are: Riyadh, Huraymla and Al-Kharj, who sent to the ruler of Al-Ahsa Ibn Uriar and warned him of the intentions of Ibn Muammar, and that he would invade Al-Ahsa if he strengthened and advised him to attack before his affair got worse.

Muhammad bin Urayer sent a message to Ibrahim Pasha while he was in the city of Jeddah telling him about Ibn Muammar's intentions to attack Al-Ahsa, and Ibrahim sent a message to his father, Muhammad Ali, who sent a message to the Ottoman Sultan informing him of Ibn Muammar's movements, so the Sultan issued an order to suppress the movement. Majid bin Urayer led a major campaign against Najd in 1920, and the people of Riyadh, Huraymila, and Al-Kharj joined his forces, and those forces attacked Manfuhah, affiliated with Ibn Muammar, and a fight took place between them, and the confrontation between them ended in a peace.

One of the Ottoman documents indicates that Ibn Uriar raided Arqa killing thirty men, plundering a convoy that was coming from Riyadh to Dir'iya, and killing people from Diriyah. The document also indicates that Ibn Muammar had two cannons that he used to resist Ibn Urayer and surpass him.

It is understood from the document that a confrontation occurred between Ibn Muammar and Ibn Urayer, as Faisal Al-Duwaish mentioned that Majid fought them, and Ibn Bishr did not refer to any confrontation between them. Rather, he mentioned that Ibn Muammar gave gifts and deceived Majid bin Urayer with some correspondence and one of the documents indicates that the gift he gave to Ibn Uri`ir was two shields, and that the people of Diriyah, under his leadership, threatened Ibn Uri`ir and refused to meet him.

As a result of the drought and the failure of Ibn Urayer to achieve any spoils or to satisfy the ambition of the tribes accompanying him, they complained about the bad situation and let it down, then leaving without achieving any significant gains. The results of this campaign were opposite to its aims, as Ibn Muammar's status rose, and his thorn strengthened in Najd rather than weakening.

Perhaps among its results is the abandonment of most of the Najdi countries of their position against the Ibn Muammar movement, as the countries of Al-Arid, Al-Muhammal, Al-Washm and Sudair joined him.

Ibn Muammar took advantage of these gains in addition to his economic power and encouraged the commercial movement between the Najd and Diriyah provinces, and he corresponded with many Najdi countries and ordered them and urged them to send supplies to Diriyah. Trade convoys were activated from Sudair, al-Mahmal, Al-Washm and others to Diriyah, so food was available at reasonable prices which led to an increase in his popularity, and he was able to command in those countries, so many of his followers and supporters were there.

Meanwhile, Turki bin Abdullah and his brother Zaid came to Ibn Muammar in Ad-Diriyah, and they joined him. The previous document indicates that Turki came with his son and his brother Zaid and Omar bin Abdul Aziz bin Muhammad bin Saud and his children, and that he came with Turki about a hundred men from the people of the south as well. Omar brought convoys of food with him, and the document also indicates that the arrival of a Turk took place at the request of Ibn Muammar, that is, an envoy from before him "came to Turkey."

Huraymla, as mentioned, was among the countries opposed to the movement of Ibn Muammar, and the head of Harimela at the time was Hamad bin Mubarak bin Abdul Rahman bin Rashid, and between the Hamad and the Rashid family, a dispute that led to a confrontation between them on Friday 24 Jumad al-Awwal 1235 AH in which men were killed on both sides and the family of Rashid was fortified in His palace was sent by Al Hamad to Ibn Muammar in Al-Diriyah and they asked him for help, so he sent them a force led by his son Mishari and with him Zaid bin Abdullah bin Muhammad bin Saud, brother of Turki bin Abdullah, and he called forces from al-Mahmal and Sudair and besieged them for a week, then they sought safety from Mishari bin Muhammad bin Muammar. On behalf of his father, he secured them on their blood, what they had, and those who were in their service, so they descended from the palace and deported with them to Diriyah, and Ibn Muammar appointed bin Hamad as governor in Huraymla, and after this procedure, the Nejdi countries pledged allegiance to Ibn Muammar, so they wrote to him and delegated to him.

=== Return to Saudi rule ===
After this success, Muhammad bin Muammar became the first figure prepared to establish the unified Najd political entity again, and in the meantime Mishari bin Saud bin Abdul Aziz appeared in northern Najd after he was able to escape from the captivity of Ibrahim Pasha’s forces at the Hamra village near Yanbu, where he was carried with his brothers and relatives to Egypt and the Ottoman document talked about the relationship between Muhammed bin Muammar and Mishari bin Saud, where it mentioned that Mishari bin Saud had gone to Jabal Shammar and stayed there, then he left for Dir'iyah after constant insistence from Ibn Muammar by his envoys.

On his way, he passed by Al-Qassim and its family honored him, and during his stay in Buraidah, Saleh bin Daghathir came to him from the people of Al-Diriyah and made an agreement with him.

Mishari bin Saud arrived in Al-Washm on the tenth of Jumada al-Akhira in 1920, then he left with men from the people of Al-Qassim, Al-Zalfi, Tharmada, and others from Diriyah in a military demonstration that announced his right in the rulership of Diriyah, and Ibn Muammar chose to abdicate and pledged allegiance to Mishari bin Saud as the imam of Diriyah, and each of them interpreted that cooperation based on his personal interest, as the factor of loyalty to the salafi cause and rescuing the homeland was common in both of them.

A letter from Faisal Al-Duwaish to Ibrahim Pasha indicates that Muhammad bin Muammar had met with Turki bin Abdullah and Mishari bin Saud and agreed on military action (and moved in Ad-Diriyah) as some Najd countries entered their obedience, especially the countries south of Najd, and pledged allegiance to Mishari bin Saud, and when this was done, he set about unifying the country and completing what Ibn Muammar had started.

He walked at the head of a force from the people of Al-Arid, Al-Mahmal, Sudair, Al-Washm, and Wadi Sebai', and headed out and seized some of his countries, then returned to Al-Dir'iyah.

=== Muhammad bin Muammar's second reign ===
The period of the first rulership of Muhammad bin Muammar was between three and seven months, and Ibn Muammar began thinking, after returning from the Kharj battle, to restore the rulership for himself, so he moved from Dir'iyah to Sadous, where the sons of his brother Ibrahim resided, and he settled there claiming that he was sick and contacted some Najd countries asking they pledge allegiance, hearing and obedience to him.

Then he walked to Ad-Diriyah, and arrested Mishari bin Saud and sent him to Sadous, where he imprisoned him and declared his reign again, then kept his son Mishari in Ad-Diriyah, and he walked to Riyadh, then Ibn Muammar summoned his son Mishari and made him prince of Riyadh and returned to Diriyah.

Things stabilized for Ibn Muammar and the countries accepted him after he wrote to them, so they delegated to him, and pledged allegiance to him in Al-Diriyah, the people of Sudair, Al-Mahmal and others, and in the meantime an army led by (Abush Agha) came to Onaizah and the countries of Al-Qassim fell to him and he wanted to go to Ad Diriyah to eliminate Mishari bin Saud and his movement, so Ibn Muammar called him and mentioned to him that he was a subordinate to the Ottoman Sultan, and that he had arrested Mishari bin Saud and promised to hand him over to him, so Abush Agha wrote to him with his approval of him in rulership. It appears that Ibn Muammar announced the nominal subordination of the Sultan for his desire to avoid confrontation with the forces of Abush Agha, until he can prepare a strong entity and he gets rid of his local opponents, and the help of some of his people and the ease with which he regained power in Dir'iyah without any resistance is attributed to the fear that the invaders will return to the region and take over its administration directly, and the consequent difficulties for the people, especially since the news began to reach some Nejdi regions of Abush Agha's campaign against Ad-Diriyah, and with this the period of the reign of Mishari bin Saud ended in shaaban or Ramadan of the year 1235 AH.

=== Death of Ibn Muammar and final return to Saudi rule ===
Things stabilized for Ibn Muammar after he seized power from Mishari bin Saud in May 1920, and he had to deal with the situation of his former relative and ally Turki bin Abdullah, who became his main rival for the Najdi leadership, as Turki did not succumb to the de facto matter.

Turki moved from Al-Hayer with some of his clan and his servants to Darma, and there are the maternal uncles of his son Faisal, and they are the Faqih family from Bani Tamim, and there were properties, farms, and palaces for the Muammar family. Ibn Muammar prepared a force of one hundred knights led by his son Mishari, Prince of Riyadh, and he sent it to Darmaa secretly, and Ibn Muammar sent a book with one of his men to some of his supporters in Darma, but Turki caught the man and read the book and knew its contents, and Turki attacked some of Ibn Muammar's soldiers in one of Darma's palaces and wounded Some of them and the rest dispersed, and the men of Mishari bin Muammar were lethargic and some of them followed Turki bin Abdullah, forcing Mishari bin Muammar to ride his horse and return to Ad-Diriyah, accompanied by two horsemen of his supporters.

Turki resided in Darmaa, gathered forces from its people, from the people of the South, Sabi`, and others, and went to Dir'iyah, where Ibn Muammar was besieged in his palace, and tried to defend, but the people of Diriyah failed him at that time and some of his men, so Turki bin Abdullah arrested him and that was on the fifth of Rabi` Awal 1921 . After he settled in Al-Diriyah, he headed to Riyadh and managed to control it and seized its Emir Mishari bin Muhammad bin Muammar and imprisoned him with his father, and asked them to release Mishari bin Saud from his prison in Sadous in exchange for their own release, so Ibn Muammar wrote to his nephew Ibrahim to release Mishari bin Saud, and they refused Due to the direction of the Egyptian forces led by Khalil Agha and Faisal Al-Dawish to them, as they received Mishari bin Saud from them.

After receiving Khalil Agha and Faisal Al-Duwaish Mishari bin Saud from Sadus, Ibn Muammar and his son Mishari were killed in Rabi` Awal 1921.

The second reign of Ibn Muammar lasted seven months as well, from May 1920 until December 1921, and with the disappearance of Muhammad bin Mishari bin Muammar and his son Mashari, the candidate to succeed him on the scene of events, the role of the Muammar family as the leader in Najd in that period ended.
