= Vanishing Point =

Vanishing Point may refer to:

- Vanishing point, a point on an image where the perspective projections of parallel lines appear to converge

== Film and television ==
- Vanishing Point (1971 film), an American action film
- Vanishing Point (1997 film), a made-for-television remake of the 1971 version
- Vanishing Point (2012 film), a documentary about the Arctic
- Vanishing Point (2026 film), a Chinese crime thriller film
- Vanishing Point, a 2013 musical film co-produced by Youth Music Theatre UK
- "Vanishing Point" (Star Trek: Enterprise), a 2002 TV episode
- "Vanishing Point" (Westworld), a 2018 TV episode
- "Vanishing Point", a 1985 episode of M.A.S.K. (TV series)
- "Vanishing Point", an episode of the 2002 science fiction series Odyssey 5

== Literature ==
- Vanishing Point (Canning novel), by Victor Canning, 1982
- Vanishing Point (Cole novel), a Doctor Who novel, 2001
- Vanishing Point (Markson novel), a 2004 novel by David Markson
- Vanishing Point (West novel), by Morris West, 1996
- Vanishing Point, a 1993 novel by Michaela Roessner
- Fluchtpunkt ('Vanishing Point'), a 1962 novel by Peter Weiss
- The Vanishing Point, a 2004 novel by Val McDermid
- Time Masters: Vanishing Point, a limited comic series starring Rip Hunter
- To the Vanishing Point, a 1988 novel by Alan Dean Foster

== Music ==
- Vanishing Point (band), an Australian progressive metal band
- Vanishing Point (Primal Scream album), 1997
- Vanishing Point (Mudhoney album), 2013
- "Vanishing Point", a song by New Order from the 1989 album Technique
- "Vanishing Point", a song by Coil from the 1995 album Unnatural History II
- "Vanishing Point", a song by Apollo 440 from the 1997 album Electro Glide in Blue
- "Vanishing Point", a song by deadmau5 from the 2008 album At Play
- "Vanishing Point", a song by Alexandra Savior, 2017

== Other uses ==
- Vanishing Point (CBC), a 1984–1990 radio drama broadcast
- Vanishing Point (theatre company), formed in Glasgow, Scotland 1999
- Vanishing Point (video game), 2001
- Vanishing Point, a pen by Pilot
- Vanishing Point (Arrowverse), a fictional location in the Arrowverse franchise

== See also ==
- Perspective (geometry)
