= Blue Boy (disambiguation) =

Blue Boy, Blueboy, Blues Boy or Blue Boys may refer to:

- The Blue Boy, a c. 1770 painting by Thomas Gainsborough
- The Blue Boy, an 1876 watercolor by Winslow Homer
- Blue Boy (novel), a 1932 novel by Jean Giono
- The Blue Boy (picture book), a 1992 children's book by Martin Auer
- Blueboy (plant), or Stirlingia, a plant genus
- Blue Boy, a rosemary cultivar
- Blueboy (magazine), a 1974–2007 gay pornographic magazine
- Blue Boys F.C., Namibian football club
- The Blue Boy, a 1926 American film directed by Arthur Maude
- The Blue Boy (film), a 1994 British film directed by Paul Murton

== Music ==
- The Blue Boys, a 1920s American ragtime band of Prater & Hayes
- The Blueboys, a 1960s predecessor of American band The Blue Things
- Blue Boys, a backing group for Jim Reeves
- "Blue Boy" (song), a 1958 single by Jim Reeves
- Blue Boys (Danish band), a 1960s vocal quartet
- Blueboy (band), a 1990s English indie pop band
- Blue Boy (DJ), Scottish DJ Lex Blackmore (fl. 1997)
- Blueboy or Superblue, stage name of Trinidadian musician Austin Lyons (born 1956)
- Blue Boys, a record label for Crash Test 02, Club Test 02, Bloom 06 and other albums
- Blue Boy (album), a 2001 album by Ron Sexsmith
- "Blue Boy", a 1970 song by Joni Mitchell from the album Ladies of the Canyon
- "Blue Boy", a 1980 single by Orange Juice
- "Blueboy", a 1997 song by John Fogerty from the album Blue Moon Swamp
- "Blue Boy", a 2014 song by Mac DeMarco from the album Salad Days

== See also ==
- Boy Blue (disambiguation)
- The Boy in Blue (disambiguation)
- Blue Girl (disambiguation)
- Blue boy trial
