= Blue Girl (disambiguation) =

Blue Girl was an American racehorse. Blue Girl may also refer to:

- Blue Girl (film), a 2020 drama film
- La Blue Girl, a 1989–1992 erotic anime
- Blue Girl Beer, a brand of beer
- Blue Girl, a pseudonym of actor and artist Eliza Schneider
- Blue Girl, an Iranian woman who self-immolated in 2019; see Death of Sahar Khodayari
- Blue Girl, a nickname for Sarajevo's Robna Kuća Sarajka department store
- Blue girl, the original name for Holly Hobbie (character)
- Blue Girl, a 1989 album by Annette Ducharme
- "Bluegirl", a 1974 short story by Marta Blanco

== See also ==
- Little Girl Blue (disambiguation)
- Girl in Blue (disambiguation)
- Blue Boy (disambiguation)
