= The Last Novel =

2007 novel by David Markson

- First edition cover
- Author: David Markson
- Publisher: Counterpoint
- Publication date: 2007

The Last Novel is a 2007 novel by American postmodern writer David Markson. Following in the tradition of his earlier work such as Wittgenstein's Mistress, Reader's Block, Vanishing Point, and This Is Not a Novel the novel is largely composed of obscure anecdotes about authors, artists, theorists, etc. The story of an ageing author, who may or may not be writing his last novel, slowly emerges through the fragments.
