= The Comforts of Madness =

The Comforts of Madness may refer to:

- The Comforts of Madness (novel) a novel by Paul Sayer
- The Comforts of Madness (album) an album by Pale Saints
