= Reader's Block =

1996 novel written by David Markson

Reader's Block is a 1996 novel written by David Markson and published by Dalkey Archive Press. With this work Markson has begun a tetralogy consisting of this book, followed by This Is Not a Novel (2001), Vanishing Point (2004), and The Last Novel (2007).

== Synopsis ==
Reader's Block employs an experimental collage writing technique and does not have a traditional narrative structure. Also, the narrator, who is called Reader, questions the book's genre, asking if it functions as a novel, an autobiography, or a poem. Instead of a standard plot, the text is composed of literary fragments, i.e., 333 unannotated quotations and anecdotes connected to Western literature and historical authors. The fragments are wide-ranging covering literary trivia, dark topics such as author suicides and lists of writers with anti-Semitic views. The tone that is perceived as both playful and highly serious. According to Publishers Weekly, within non-traditional format, the book explores the concept of novel-writing, and critiques the standard narratives of novels. This work has been recognized as being similarly styled to James Joyce's notebooks for Joyce's novels.

== Reception ==
Anne Beattie writing for Ploughshares says, "Markson's novel advances by allusion and cumulative effect, like a big snowball going downhill... This is really a work of genius: real flotsam and jetsam, recycled as philosophy. It's hypnotic and unique; of course, that would guarantee that the mainstream press wouldn't give a damn." Joanna Scott writing for The Nation says, "...Markson's narrator weighs life against death and death against art, testing the effects of time and the resilience of the human imagination. Kirkus Reviews says, "A novel, in all, for the ultra-readerly only, though in its own way often deeply melancholy, suggestive, and moving. [In this book] Nabokov speaks for Markson's aesthetic aims, while Shakespeare synopsizes the personal wistfulness and deep sorrow permeating this remarkable book. Michael Boylan reviewing this work for the Library Journal of New York says, "[The book] is intensely personal, with nothing really universal presented about the human condition, and as such has a very limited appeal.
