= The God Child =

1996 crime novel by Paul Sayer

- First edition
- Author: Paul Sayer
- Cover artist: William Webb; Michael Wildsmith
- Language: English
- Publisher: Bloomsbury
- Publication date: 1996
- Publication place: United Kingdom
- Media type: Print
- Pages: 217
- ISBN: 0-7475-2801-2

The God Child is a crime novel by English author Paul Sayer published in 1996.

== Plot introduction ==
Bankrupt Harold Broome, separated from his wife and taunted by a letter from her new lover who returns to the fictional Yorkshire coastal town of Oughton (based on Filey) where his mother runs a hotel. But the tranquility is shattered when his niece Maisie appears with a stranger. A few hours later Maisie rings Harold to say that the man is dead. Harold hesitates to ring the police and decides to dispose of the corpse to protect Maisie...

== Inspiration ==
In an interview Sayer explains that the story is based on a real life murder of a hotelier by his wife and the barman who was also her lover, and also took as inspiration Truman Capote's In Cold Blood. Sayer explains that rather than concentrate on the detective investigating the crime he instead concentrated on the close, intense family relationships surrounding Harold and Maisie.

== Reception ==
It received mixed reviews:

- The Times praised Sayer as "a subtle moralist with an eye for the stranger byways of vice and virtue" and declared the novel as "fresh evidence for his talent and seriousness."
- Andy Beckett in The Independent wrote "Sayer's writing is spare and cool, slightly at odds with the melodrama it carries; at the end, his tone of seaside resignation, of lives stilled between the town's great sweep of beach and sky, begins to infect and slow the pace of events. Broome is questioned and accused, he in turn demands the truth from Maisie - yet all of these confrontations lack the back-and-forth decisiveness of a thriller climax, opting instead for friction and frustration, the stuff of Alan Bennett rather than Alistair MacLean. It doesn't quite work. Maisie and the dead man never become more than sketches. Broome's panics never boil into hysteria. Yet the eerie quiet that surrounds their final accommodation has its power."
