= Little Girl Blue =

Little Girl Blue may refer to:

- "Little Girl Blue" (song), a 1935 song by Richard Rodgers and Lorenz Hart
- Little Girl Blue (album), an album by Nina Simone
- Little Girl Blue/Little Girl New, a 1963 album by Keely Smith
- Little Girl Blue (2007 film), a Czech film directed by Alice Nellis
- Janis: Little Girl Blue, a 2015 documentary film
- Little Girl Blue (2023 film), a French-Belgian docudrama film directed by Mona Achache
- Nickname given by the media to Helen Bailey, an eight-year-old schoolgirl who was killed in 1975; see killing of Helen Bailey

== See also ==
- Blue Girl (disambiguation)
- Little Boy Blue (disambiguation)
