= Bookforum =

American book review magazine

- Bookforum cover April/May 2010
- Editor: Michael Miller
- Former editors: Eric Banks; (Editor); Chris Lehmann; (Co-Editor); Maggie Foucault; (Associate Editor); Alfredo Perez; (Bookforum.com Editor)
- Categories: Literature, culture
- Frequency: Quarterly
- Circulation: 60,000
- Publisher: Bhaskar Sunkara
- Founded: 1994; 31 years ago
- Company: 1865 Publications LLC
- Country: United States
- Based in: New York City, New York
- Language: English
- Website: bookforum.com
- ISSN: 1098-3376
- OCLC: 757565508

Bookforum is an American book review magazine devoted to books and the discussion of literature. After announcing that it would cease publication in December 2022, it reported its relaunch under the direction of The Nation magazine six months later.

== History ==
Based in New York City, New York, the magazine was launched in 1994 as a literary supplement to Artforum. Originally published biannually, it became a quarterly in 1998, and since 2005, Bookforum has published five times a year in February, April, June, September, and December.

Describing the magazine to The Village Voice in 2003, former editor (2003–2008) Eric Banks said that the magazine targets a demographic "like the New York Review's but much younger. I think there is an audience of intellectual readers between 25 and 40 out there – the kind of person who buys The New Republic, The Nation, and The New York Review of Books, but doesn't have an allegiance to a particular publication."

In addition to publishing book reviews, essays and current-events columns, the magazine regularly features interviews with authors, including:

- Chimamanda Ngozi Adichie
- Martin Amis
- John Ashbery
- John Barth
- A. S. Byatt
- Jerome Charyn
- Lydia Davis
- Umberto Eco
- Mary Gaitskill
- Nadine Gordimer
- Aleksandar Hemon
- Amy Hempel
- John Irving
- Jhumpa Lahiri
- Doris Lessing
- Bernard-Henri Lévy
- Alan Moore
- Lorrie Moore
- Haruki Murakami
- Cees Nooteboom
- Joyce Carol Oates
- Michael Ondaatje
- Alain Robbe-Grillet
- Salman Rushdie
- Vikram Seth
- Susan Sontag
- Muriel Spark
- Robert Stone
- Gore Vidal
- William T. Vollmann

In 2009, the magazine's website was redesigned to include a nationwide literary-events calendar, internet exclusive book reviews, two blogs — Paper Trail and Omnivore — and a section called Syllabi, which features reading lists written by authors and critics.

On December 12, 2022, Bookforum announced that it would cease publication following the purchase of its companion magazine Artforum by Penske Media Corporation (PMC) earlier that month. In June 2023, it announced it would return in August 2023 through a partnership with The Nation.

== Notable contributors ==
- J. G. Ballard, novelist and short-story writer
- John Banville, novelist and critic
- Harold Bloom, academic and critic
- Louise Bourgeois, artist
- A. S. Byatt, novelist and poet
- Billy Collins, poet
- Dennis Cooper, writer, editor and artist
- Lydia Davis, short-story writer and translator
- Stacey D'Erasmo, novelist
- Michael Dirda, critic
- Geoff Dyer, novelist and critic
- Gerald Early, writer and academic
- Jennifer Egan, novelist and short-story writer
- Dave Eggers, writer and publisher
- Richard Ford, novelist and short-story writer
- Mary Gaitskill, novelist and short-story writer
- William H. Gass, writer
- Keith Gessen, co-founder of literary magazine n+1
- Thelma Golden, curator
- Nan Goldin, photographer
- Kim Gordon, artist and musician
- Germaine Greer, writer and academic
- Richard Hell, writer and musician
- Amy Hempel, short-story writer
- Sheila Heti, novelist
- bell hooks, author and activist
- Maureen Howard, novelist
- Travis Jeppesen, novelist and critic
- Wayne Koestenbaum, poet and critic
- Barbara Kruger, artist
- Hari Kunzru, novelist and journalist
- Jonathan Lethem, novelist
- Phillip Lopate, film critic and writer
- Naguib Mahfouz, winner of the Nobel Prize in Literature
- Greil Marcus, music journalist and critic
- Patrick McGrath, writer and academic
- Daphne Merkin, critic
- Stephin Merritt, musician
- D. A. Miller, academic and critic
- Toril Moi, academic
- Rick Moody, novelist
- Michael Musto, columnist
- Glenn O'Brien, editor and critic
- Marjorie Perloff, critic
- Caryl Phillips, novelist
- Matthew Price, journalist
- Francine Prose, novelist
- Salman Rushdie, novelist and essayist
- Andrew Solomon, writer
- Christopher Sorrentino, novelist
- Lorin Stein, editor and critic
- Lynne Tillman, novelist, short-story writer and critic
- Colm Tóibín, novelist and critic
- William T. Vollmann, novelist and journalist
- Sarah Vowell, writer and journalist
- Rebecca Walker, writer and activist
- Michael Wood, academic
- Adam Zagajewski, poet and essayist

== See also ==
- List of literary magazines
- List of United States magazines
- Media in New York City
