= Tom Lecky =

American bookseller, musician and artist (born 1972)

- Born: Thomas Lecky; 1972 (age 53–54)
- Education: Columbia University, Stanford University
- Occupations: Antiquarian bookseller, Musician, Artist
- Years active: 1995–present
- Known for: Guitar, piano, photography, drawing
- Style: Experimental, jazz, Photography
- Website: www.thomaslecky.com

Thomas Lecky (born 1972 in Plattsburgh, New York) is an American antiquarian bookseller, musician, and artist. He was the Head of Books and Manuscripts at Christie’s auction house in New York, and is the owner of Riverrun Books & Manuscripts. He also records music under the name Hallock Hill and is an artist and writer who has published photo books and artist's books.

== Early life and education ==
Tom Lecky was born in Plattsburgh, New York and lived in the Adirondack Mountains region of upstate New York through most of his youth. Lecky went to Choate Rosemary Hall and received his BA in English from Columbia University and MA in American Literature from Stanford University. At Stanford, Lecky studied with Gilbert Sorrentino who introduced Lecky to the writers and methods of the Oulipo group and fostered his interest William Carlos Williams, the so-called Language poets, and the writers and artists of Black Mountain College. Lecky began editing the letters of Irving Rosenthal (see Kaliflower Commune) to Allen Ginsberg and Ira Cohen relating the Rosenthal's novel "Sheeper" (edited by Sorrentino while working for Grove Press). After Stanford, Lecky returned to New York to begin his career in the auction world handling rare books, manuscripts, and archives. Lecky lives in Hastings-on-Hudson New York with his wife and two sons.

== Rare-book appraising and auctioning ==
Tom Lecky began his career as the Head of Books and Prints at William Doyle Galleries in New York City. Lecky then served as a rare-book specialist for Christie’s auction house in New York, where he was Head of Books and Manuscripts. An auction he worked on early in his tenure in 2001, was the original manuscript for Jack Kerouac’s On The Road. In 2026, he bought the On the Road manuscript on behalf of a client at the auction of the estate of Jim Irsay for $12,135,000, establishing a new world record for a literary manuscript at auction. In 2012, the Robb Report reported that Lecky had noted a change in the trend of rare-book collectors, moving from focusing on a single author in the past to those looking to create a more expansive library. The BBC also noted his role in the pricing and auctioning of rare maps and atlases.

Lecky also served as an auctioneer for Christie’s. Over the years he auctioned items including the Stratocaster guitar played by Bob Dylan during the 1965 Newport Folk Festival where he first played electric guitar live, a sale that set the world auction record for the price of a guitar. He was also the auctioneer for the original lyrics to Don McLean’s song “American Pie”, a copy of the US Constitution with hand written notes by its owner President George Washington, and for philanthropic auctions supporting organizations like the PEN American Center. Lecky was a witness in the case involving manuscript lyrics for The Eagles’ “Hotel California” that had appeared on the market in the 2010s.

In 2016 Lecky acquired the company Riverrun Books & Manuscripts, which was founded in 1978 in Hastings-on-Hudson, New York. The business sells rare books, in addition to providing estate, charitable donation, and insurance appraisals. Lecky is also frequently featured as an appraiser on the Antique Roadshow, where he appraises Books and Manuscripts including letters written by Mahatma Gandhi, and Franklin D. Roosevelt. In 2019 he appeared in the documentary The Booksellers, that featured New York area book sellers.

Lecky is also the founder of the publisher Understory Books.

== Music career ==
Lecky performs as the musical artist Hallock Hill, playing and recording on the guitar and piano. In 2011 he released his first solo acoustic guitar album The Union on the label Hundred Acre Recordings. Ash Akhtar reviewed the work for The Quietus, stating that “There is something wondrous about this implacable and partly untraceable album.” Marc Masters of Pitchfork reviewed the work as filled with “wistful emotions and fond memories [that] can be as deep and complex as darker themes. It’s my favorite solo acoustic album of the year so far.”

After several self-released albums, such as There He Unforeseen, in 2014 he released his fourth album, Kosloff Mansion, again on Hundred Acre Recordings. Ben Graham of The Quietus reviewed the album, stating “Like all of [Hallock Hill’s] releases, it insinuates itself into your life, and gradually takes it over. The first time you play this record, you barely notice that it’s there; but you keep returning to it, on grey rainy afternoons, on hungover Sunday mornings when it’s about all you can face, and slowly it begins to flower, revealing new aspects, fresh layers on each listen.” In The Wire Magazine, Nick Southgate wrote about The Union/A Hem of Evening, "In a world overpopulated with acoustic guitar players, Lecky’s increasingly refined and focused experiments with such shifting, half-repeating, subtly accreting textures makes his music stand out as having courage and vision where far too many only have technique and tradition.”

== Art career ==
Lecky is a visual artist and bookmaker. His 2012 artist’s book A Hem of Evening accompanied the album The Union/A Hem of Evening (MIE Records). His photobook The Archive of Bernard Taylor was profiled by The Nearest Truth: “This quizzical tome considers a form of local history and the phantom-like presence of an author defined by his output more than his life. It is an interesting take on American biography, history, and the permeable ability for photography to be read with imagination and vigor despite its disregard to conform to absolutes.” Bomb Magazine described the book as “at times disorienting, playful, melancholy, and retrospective.”

== Discography ==
=== Solo ===
- The Union CD, Hundred Acre Recordings (UK), 2011. OCLC 874811301
- There He Unforeseen CD, No Label (US), 2011
- Found Objects CD, No Label (US), 2011
- The Union/A Hem of Evening 2LP, MIE Music (UK), 2012
- Kosloff Mansion, Hundred Acre Recordings (UK), 2014. Collaboration with Tim Noble of The Lowland Hundred OCLC 900890755
- Folsom Cave, MP3 release, 2015

=== Collaborations ===
- Imaginational Anthem Vol. 5, Tompkins Square Records, 2012. OCLC 813547326

== Bibliography ==
- Concord, New York : Understory, 2022, ISBN 978-1-7375743-2-3, OCLC 1370362153
- Quarrying, New York, Understory, 2021, OCLC 1370356984
- The Archive of Bernard Taylor, New York, Understory, 2021, ISBN 9780578787886, OCLC 1268146736
- Agloe, New York, Understory, 2021, OCLC 1291626614
- Home, New York, Understory, 2020, ISBN 9780578606064, OCLC 1370356199
