= Nina Beachcroft =

English writer (born 1931)

Ellinor Nina Beachcroft (born 10 November 1931) is an English writer, who specialises in children's fantasy novels.

== Biography ==
Ellinor Nina Beachcroft was born on 10 November 1931, daughter of the writer Thomas Owen (T.O.) Beachcroft. She was educated at Wimbledon High School and St Hilda's College, Oxford 1950–53. In 1954 she married Richard Gardner, with whom she had two daughters. In the 1950s, she worked as a sub editor for The Argosy and the Radio Times and currently lives in Knebworth, Hertfordshire, England. Her first novel Well Met By Witchlight was published in the UK in 1972. She has written nine children's novels.

== Literary criticism ==
Beachcroft's novels are in the children's fantasy genre, including witches, genies and other magic characters interacting with human children. Neil Philip in the London Times describes her magical plots as having "none of the portentous mysticism of many of the vogue fantasies of the sixties and seventies ... instead she uses magic lightly to explore the theme of control."

== Books ==
- Well Met by Witchlight (Heinemann, 1972); Atheneum Books, 1973
- Under the Enchanter (Heinemann, 1974)
- Cold Christmas: A Ghost Story (Heinemann, 1974)
- A Spell of Sleep (Heinemann, 1976)
- A Visit to Folly Castle (Heinemann, 1977)
- A Farthing for the Fair (Heinemann, 1978)
- The Wishing People (Heinemann, 1980)
- The Genie and Her Bottle (Heinemann, 1983)
- Beyond World's End (Heinemann, 1985)
