= Hamad al-Hajji =

Saudi Arabian poet (1939–1988)

Hamad alhejji
- حمد الحجّي
- Born: 1939; Marat, Al-Washm Region, Saudi Arabia
- Died: 8 November 1988 (aged 49); Taif, Mecca Province, Saudi Arabia
- Education: College of Sharia Sciences
- Occupation: Poet
- Writing career
- Language: Arabic
- Notable work: The Torment of the Years

Hamad al-Hajji (Arabic: حمد الحجي, romanized: Ḥamad Alhejji; 1939 – 8 November 1988) was a Saudi Arabian poet. He was born in Marat, a small town south of Shaqra, in the Al-Washm Region. His mother died when he was less than ten years old, and was raised in poverty by his sister Hayla and her husband. After obtaining a primary certificate in his hometown, he moved to the Saudi capital, Riyadh, in 1951. There, he studied at the College of Sharia and the College of Arabic Language, and took first exams in both colleges. Before his planned graduation in 1961, he developed a mental illness, and was diagnosed with severe schizophrenia. He was treated in Saudi hospitals, as well as in Kuwait, Iran, Lebanon, Egypt and the United Kingdom, but there were only slight improvements to his condition. He died at the age of 49 after a lung disease.

Alhejji was known for his poetic love for his homeland and literary expressions of pessimism and darkness. A collection of his poetry, (anthology) titled The Torment of the Years (Arabic: عذاب السنين, romanized: ʿaḏāb as-sinīn), was published the year after his death, compiled by Muhammad bin Ahmed Al-Shadi, the editor-in-chief of Al Yamamah magazine. These poems represent the bulk of his works before his illness.

== Biography ==
=== Early years ===
Al-Hajji's full name (nasab) was Hamad bin Sa'd bin Muhammad bin Musa Al-Hajji, and he traced his lineage to the Hudhayl tribe. He was born in 1939 in the town of Marat in the Al-Washm Region. His father was known to be a vernacular poet. His mother died when he was around 9 years old. His father was poor, and lived for a long time without remarrying, which made his children runaways from the house. His father had a small shop in which he sold coffee and cardamom, but his income was not enough to feed a family. Living in loneliness and poverty, Al-Hajji went to the house of Muhammad al-Du'aij, his sister Hayla's husband. There, he found a new home to make up for some of what he had lost. Hayla became his legal guardian and sponsored Hamad after the death of their mother in her husband's house, until Hamad graduated from primary school. The same year his mother died, he also lost his brother Ibrahim, who was one year old at the time of his mother's death. His other brother Abd al-Aziz also died two years after his mother's death, at the age of nine. The succession of these deaths in the family during a short period of Al-Hajji's childhood affected him greatly. Hamad studied at the traditional elementary school (kuttab) in his hometown, and later achieved the ninth place in the ranking of successful students in the 1953 primary certificate exams in the Kingdom of Saudi Arabia. But after the death of his mother, he became depressed.

=== College years ===
After graduating from elementary school in Marat in 1951, Al-Hajji moved to Riyadh and joined the Scientific Institute in 1952, where he studied at the intermediate and secondary levels. In Riyadh, he made new friends and mingled with different people that were new to him. At this period, his literary talent emerged, as he wrote a number of his first poems. After obtaining the certificate of the Scientific Institute in Riyadh, he joined the College of Islamic Law (Sharia) in 1957. After two years, he enrolled in the College of Arabic Language. The two years he studied at the College of Sharia were credited for him, so he began his studies from the third year in the new college. Muhammad bin Ahmed Al-Shadi, who later edited Al-Hajji's poetry, mentioned that he joined the College of Arabic Language without leaving the Sharia College and that is why he took exams in both faculties. During his college years, his literary talent became publicly known. Despite the encouragement of some of his classmates, he was exposed to some negative situations that affected him, either in his poetry or his personal attitudes. In general, he found appreciation only from a few of his fellow students.

Al-Hajji did not complete his college studies, and before his planned graduation in the academic year 1960–61, he developed a mental illness. Doctors reported that he had severe schizophrenia, which prevented him from completing his studies, and also prevented him from writing poetry. Before his mental illness, he had pursued his studies without interruption, and was distinguished in his achievements and poetry.

=== Middle years ===
Among the most important characteristics of Hamad Al-Hajji, for which he was known by his peers, was his extreme sensitivity to the situations he was going through. Because of his poverty, he lived in a welfare center in Riyadh. Once in 1987 the Center Manager Fahd Al-Tujairi was asked about what Al-Hajji liked there, and he mentioned the 10th century poet Al-Mutanabbi: "In many cases, when he is in a bad psychological state, and does not want to talk to anyone, Al-Mutanabbi is the key to talking to him." Al-Hajji memorized a lot of Al-Mutanabbi's poetry even during his illness, and when Fahd Al-Tuwaijri deliberately changed some words in Al-Mutanabbi's poetry, Al-Hajji alerted him to these mistakes. After he contracted the disease, he became isolated from people, and did not want to sit with them except in a rare few occasions. Also, he did not talk a lot with them, and rather went to the social worker's office in the center to read the newspapers and then left. When someone spoke to him, he did not respond at all or only very briefly. He also did not participate in the weekly trips organized by the center, but rather sat alone. There was no shortcoming in his mind at that time, but all the center staff knew him for his mental abilities and high level of education. For example, he was able to answer Ramadan riddles from his memorization of the Quran.

In Riyadh, he was first treated by the psychologist Saad Al-Jeryan. Then he moved to the mental health hospital in Taif for treatment, which was unsuccessful. Al-Hajji was a frequent traveler, at first for tourism, and when he had his mental illness, he left his country more than once for treatment, after unsuccessful efforts of treatment in Saudi Arabia. Having visited Lebanon more than once before his illness, he sought treatment there and later also in Kuwait. He stayed there for about a year, and his condition improved a little after his return from Kuwait. Then he traveled to London in the UK, and stayed there for two months, with this treatment bringing some positive effects. After that, he went to Egypt for treatment as well.

=== Final years and death ===
After having moved between hospitals and psychiatric clinics at home and abroad, he spent his last years in Shehar hospital in Taif. Hamad al-Zayd, a poet from Al-Hajji hometown he who believed that Al-Hajji was envied, visited him often, and carries to him Kent cigarettes, which he smoked greedily. Al-Hajji died on 29 Rabi' al-Awwal 1409 (8 November 1988) of a lung disease at the age of 49 in Taif. He was buried in his hometown, having written a rithā' lament for himself twenty-eight years before his death, while he was in Lebanon.

== Poetry ==
A collection of his poetry titled The Torment of the Years was published the year after his death, compiled by Muhammad bin Ahmed Al-Shadi, the editor-in-chief of Al Yamamah magazine. These 61 poems form the bulk of what Al-Hajji wrote before his illness. Literary critics commenting on his poetry after his death called him the "poet of Najd" and "the sad poet", and likened him to Al-Shabi, Tarafa, and Elia Abu Madi, as he suffered from alienation in his illness. The dictionary Al-Babtain described his poetry as follows:

In his poetry, he shows his nostalgia for Najd, mixed with love for the homeland. He breathes in the movement that allows himself to reveal and read inside him and portray the obsessions that dictated his pessimism and darkness. He endeavored to show this in figurative forms and images. In most of his poetry he used the rhymed meter, sometimes varied in rhymes but employing free verse too.

Saleh Al-Mahmud, writing in the 2015 Dictionary of Modern Arabic Literature, divided Al-Hajji's poetic work into three stages. The first is the time before his disease, which forms his beginnings. The second is the years of the disease, which was a creative period. The third reflects the disease years, in which the poet's creativity declined, when he wrote only very few verses and even refused to be in touch with any poetry.

== See also ==
- Creativity and mental health § Schizophrenia
