= Little Boy Blue (disambiguation) =

"Little Boy Blue" is a nursery rhyme.

Little Boy Blue may also refer to:

- Little Boy Blue (1912 film), a silent one-reel film
- Little Boy Blue (1997 film), a drama starring Ryan Phillippe, Nastassja Kinski, and John Savage
- Little Boy Blue (novel), a 1981 novel by Edward Bunker
- Little Boy Blue (operetta), the title of the 1911 Broadway production of the 1910 operetta Lord Piccolo
- "Little Boy Blue" (poem), an 1888 poem by Eugene Field
- Little Boy Blue (TV series), a 2017 TV series based on the murder of Rhys Jones
- "Little Boy Blue", parlour song by Ethelbert Woodbridge Nevin
- The Little Boy Blues, an American rock band

== See also ==
- Little Girl Blue (disambiguation)
- Boy Blue (disambiguation)
- Little Boy Boo, a "Looney Tunes" cartoon
