= Christopher Sorrentino =

American writer (born 1963)

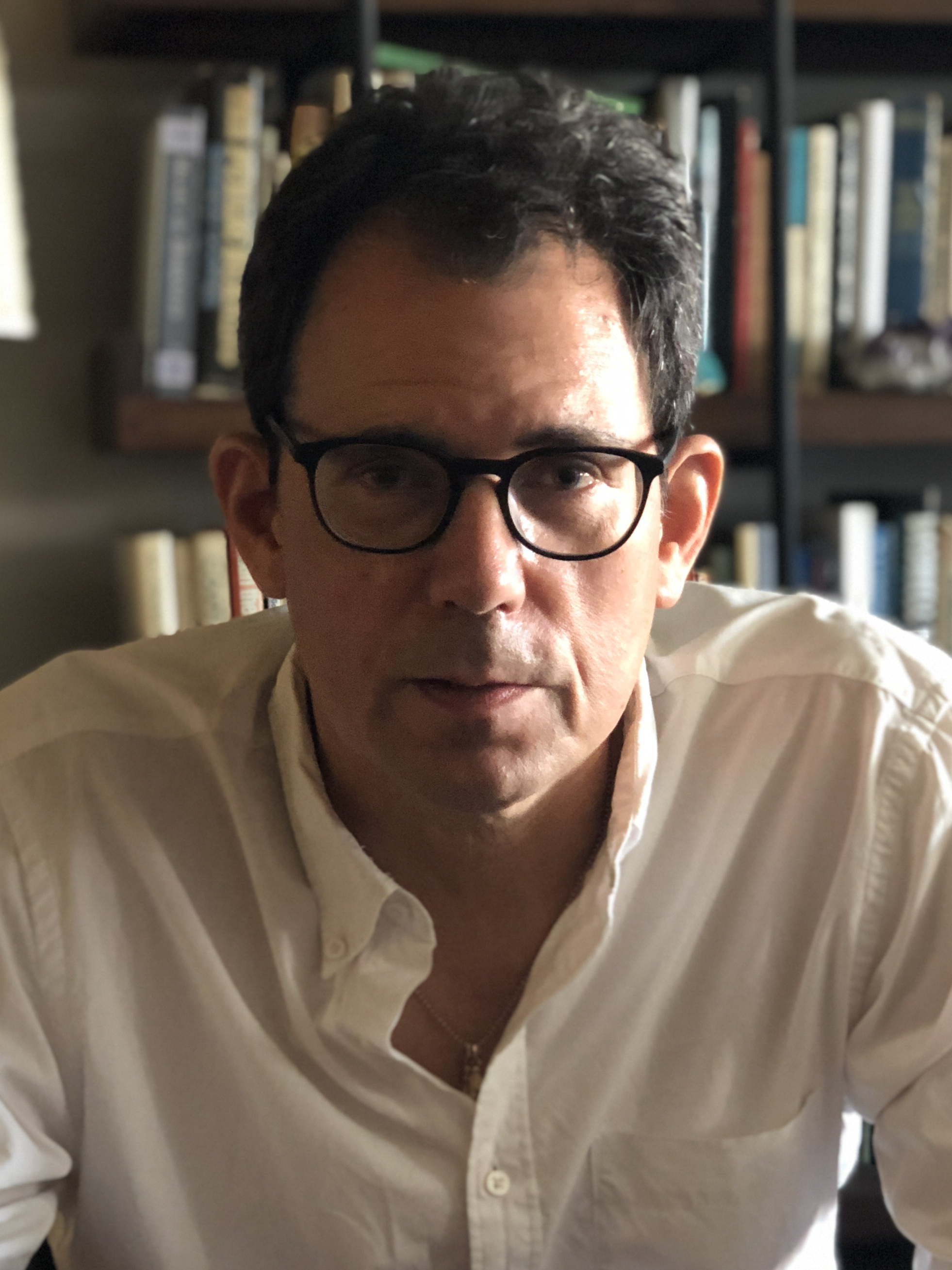
- Sorrentino in 2021
- Born: May 20, 1963 (age 63); New York City, U.S.
- Education: Hunter College; State University of New York; Empire State College (BA)
- Occupations: Novelist, short story writer, memoirist

Christopher Sorrentino (born May 20, 1963) is an American novelist and short story writer of Italian and Puerto Rican descent. He is the son of novelist Gilbert Sorrentino and Victoria Ortiz. His first published novel, Sound on Sound (1995), draws upon innovations pioneered in the work of his father, but also contains echoes of many other modernist and postmodernist writers. The book is structured according to the format of a multitrack recording session, with corresponding section titles ("Secondary Percussion", "Vocals", "Playback", and so forth).

His second novel, Trance (2005), an epic fictional treatment of the Patty Hearst saga, used many of the same experimental techniques as Sound on Sound, but, according to Sorrentino, incorporated them more carefully and subtly into the text. The book was widely praised for its lush descriptions, riveting characterizations and dialogue, imaginative departures, and attention to period detail. Trance ended up on several reviewers' "best" lists, was named a finalist for the 2005 National Book Award for Fiction, and was longlisted for the 2007 International Dublin Literary Award. In 2009, Trance was named one of the "61 Essential Postmodern Reads" by the Los Angeles Times.

In 2006 New York magazine revealed that Sorrentino and Jonathan Lethem were the writers behind the pseudonymous Ivan Felt and Harris Conklin, authors of Believeniks!: 2005: The Year We Wrote a Book About the Mets, a "hyperliterary account of the Mets’ 2005 season" that was intended as "a playful poke at book-world scams."

Sorrentino's next book, American Tempura, a collaboration with artist Derek Boshier, was published by Nothing Moments Press in the fall of 2007. A novella, American Tempura is a satire about commercial moviemaking in Los Angeles. Death Wish, a monograph on the 1974 film of the same name, was published in the fall of 2010 by Soft Skull Press as one of the inaugural entries in its Deep Focus series of film books.

In April 2014 it was announced that Sorrentino would publish his next novel, The Fugitives, with Simon & Schuster. The novel, published in February 2016, deals with the existential crisis of a blocked writer who becomes entangled with a Native American imposter involved in a casino theft and the reporter sent to investigate the crime. The novel is related by several unreliable narrators and is concerned with questions of identity, racial passing, and the nature of storytelling. Writing in The New York Times, Dwight Garner criticized its blending of genres as "something close to a disaster," but Viet Thanh Nguyen, in The New York Times Book Review, called it an "elegantly constructed novel" and cautioned that "Sorrentino's novel might be a little deceptive because it disguises its complexity," while Jim Ruland in the Los Angeles Times described The Fugitives as "stunning" and "an entirely new kind of novel."

Now Beacon, Now Sea was published by Catapult in September 2021. A memoir, it traces Sorrentino's difficult relationship with his mother, Victoria. Writing in The New York Times Book Review, Eleanor Henderson described it as "Acute, intimate and exceedingly fair...[W]e may have a greater cultural appetite for eulogies, but an autopsy, in looking directly at the cold corpse of a family in all its gruesomeness and mystery, can be just as profound, and in the hands of a writer as restrained and humane as Sorrentino, just as beautiful." It was named a New York Times Notable Book for 2021.

In 2022, Sorrentino was awarded a fellowship by the John Simon Guggenheim Memorial Foundation.

Sorrentino's work has appeared in such publications as The New York Times, Esquire, Harper's, The Paris Review, Playboy, Granta, McSweeney's, Tin House, Open City, Bookforum, Conjunctions, and many others.

Sorrentino has taught at Eugene Lang College The New School for Liberal Arts and at Columbia University School of the Arts, and is a member of the faculty at the Unterberg Poetry Center of the 92nd Street Y. He was the visiting writer at Fairleigh Dickinson University in 2010–2011. He currently lives in New York City with his partner, the writer and editor Minna Proctor, and their children.

== Works ==
Fiction

- Sound on Sound (1995)
- Trance (2005)
- Believeniks!: 2005: The Year We Wrote a Book About the Mets (2006), with Jonathan Lethem (as "Ivan Felt" and "Harris Conklin")
- American Tempura (2007)
- The Fugitives (2016)

Nonfiction

- Death Wish (2010)
- Now Beacon, Now Sea (2021)

Contributions to Books and Anthologies

- "The Pride of Life," They’re at It Again: An Open City Reader, edited by Thomas Beller and Joanna Yas, New York: Open City Books, 2011
- "Death in the Age of Digital Proliferation, and Other Considerations," The Inevitable: Contemporary Writers Confront Death, Ed. David Shields and Bradford Morrow, New York: WW Norton, 2011
- "When He Was Seventeen," More New York Stories: The Best of the City Section of The New York Times, Ed. Constance Rosenblum, New York: NYU Press, 2010
- "Dave Kingman," Top of the Order: 25 Writers Pick Their Favorite Baseball Player, Ed. Sean Manning, New York: Da Capo, 2010
- Introduction to The Abyss of Human Illusion, by Gilbert Sorrentino, Minneapolis: Coffee House Press, 2010
- "Misapprehensions," A Best of Fence: The First Nine Years, Ed. Rebecca Wolff, Albany, NY: Fence Books, 2009
- "Julie Halo," New Standards, Ed. Jason Snyder, San Francisco: Fourteen Hills Press, 2005
- "Organism," The Future Dictionary of America, Ed. Jonathan Safran Foer, Dave Eggers, and Nicole Krauss, San Francisco: McSweeney's Books, 2004
- "The Ger Sheker," Give Our Regards to the Atomsmashers: Writers on Comics, ed. Sean Howe, New York: Pantheon Books, 2004
