= Girl in Blue (disambiguation) =

Girl in Blue or Girls in Blue may refer to:

- Devojka u Plavom, or Girl in Blue, an 1856 painting by Đura Jakšić
- The Girls in Blue, a 1957 film directed by Leo Anchóriz
- The Girl in Blue, a 1970 novel by P. G. Wodehouse
- The Girl in Blue (film), or U-Turn, a 1973 film
- Girl in Blue, a 2001 novel by Ann Rinaldi
- The Girl in Blue (TV series), a 2010 Chinese drama
- The Girls in Blue, a 2012 novel by Dilly Court (as Lily Baxter)
- Girls in Blue, a nickname for the Dublin county ladies' football team
- Girl in Blue (stylised in all lowercase), an alias of Girl in Red

== See also ==
- Blue Girl (disambiguation)
- The Boy in Blue (disambiguation)
