= Little Casino =

Little Casino is written by Gilbert Sorrentino and published by Coffee House Press in May 2002. The novel is based on a perception of the working-class neighborhoods of Brooklyn during the post-World War II era, which serves as a historical and cultural backdrop for the narrative. Sorrento was a PEN/Faulkner award finalist for Little Casino

== Synopsis ==
The novel lacks a conventional, developed plot and fully rounded characters. The book is structured as a sequence of 52 seemingly random, essay-like chapters, resulting in a vignette format. The individual vignettes function effectively as self-contained short stories, to the point where the individual parts may be more accessible than the overarching narrative. The author includes brief commentary at the conclusion of each chapter, which ranges in tone from clever and poignant to deliberately obscure.

The prose mimics the realistic, non-linear play of consciousness, creating the effect of a collective memoir. Although unconventional in its structure, the writing is described as clear, inviting, and frank, avoiding the obscurity often associated with experimental fiction. The narrative moves erratically across different years, geographic locations, and character perspectives. The settings range from the 1930s and postwar Brooklyn to later periods on the West Coast, including a professorship in Palo Alto. The vignettes cover a wide array of human experiences and tangents, including death, lost love, boyhood legends, unfulfilled desire, sexual encounters, New York bookies, and military slang.

This novel becomes a work of metafiction. Also, the book consists of not only vignettes, but also anecdotes and "verbal photographs." Despite its fragmented structure, the novel successfully builds a clear and comprehensible depiction of an authentic Brooklyn. The text substitutes normal dramatic tension and forward plot movement found in conventional narratives with flippant or vitriolic humor. For example, the author writes: "Herbert Hoover died at the age of 137, of course. [Also, it] is said that he never ate a steak in his life, and that his favorite dinner was farmer cheese on soda crackers with skim milk."

== Critical assessment ==
The book relies on the author's writing style, rather than the usual recurrence of character trait, setting, motif, symbol, or image, that hold the fragmented narrative together. The absence of a core setting or protagonist makes deciphering a unified plot nearly impossible, which may frustrate readers looking for a cohesive whole.

== Reception ==
Publishers Weekly says, "By themselves, the chapters are easily digestible morsels of delicious prose—self-contained stories that offer sometimes dreamy, sometimes gritty glimpses into ordinary lives. According to Mark Ciabattari, writing for Italian Americana, "Unlike much of the work branded experimental, his writing is clear, intriguing, and inviting to any reader" Martin Riker, reviewing this work for Review of Contemporary Fiction says, "Throughout Sorrentino's career, life has served as the material for his art-"material" in the sense of what an artist uses to build something-and the same material has often reappeared in new forms, not just scenes and items, but entire books being recast in new language." According to Daniel Green, writing for The Antioch Review, "Sorrentino's fictions are both hilariously funny and corrosively provocative, offering a scathing portrayal of the manifold inanities of American culture as well as entertainingly outrageous comic performances."

== See also ==
- This Is Not a Novel by David Markson
