= Now, Now, Markus =

1988 children's novel by Martin Auer

- First edition
- Author: Martin Auer
- Original title: Bimbo und sein Vogel
- Illustrator: Simone Klages
- Language: German
- Genre: Children's novel
- Publisher: Beltz & Gelberg (Germany); Greenwillow Books (US)
- Publication date: 1988
- Publication place: Germany
- English publication date: 1989
- Media type: Print (Paperback)
- ISBN: 0-688-08975-5
- OCLC: 233532828

Now, Now, Markus or, I Need a Bird is a children's novel by Austrian author Martin Auer, first published in 1988 in German as Bimbo und sein Vogel. It is illustrated by German artist Simone Klages.

The original was also translated into Japanese, French, Dutch, Swedish, Norwegian, and Finnish. An American English translation was published 1989 by Greenwillow Books.

== Plot summary ==
Markus's parents never really listen to what Markus has to say and instead often react with standard phrases ("Oh my goodness!" said his mother. "Now now now" said his father). So Markus has to attract their attention by dropping dead. When he finally gets them to agree that he can have a bird he comes home with a swan. Of course he is not allowed to keep it, so he decides to live in the woods. There he is eaten by a giant, but his swan saves him. When Markus comes back home and his parents, as usual, do not believe his story, all the beings that have been saved from the giant's stomach march into the house.
