= Boy Blue =

Boy Blue may refer to:

- Boy Blue (Pop Rock Band), a Pop Rock band from northern New Jersey.
- "Boy Blue" (Electric Light Orchestra song)
- "Boy Blue" (Cyndi Lauper song)
- Boy Blue (Fables), a fictional character in the Vertigo comic book series Fables, based on the "Little Boy Blue" nursery rhyme.
- Boy Blue, a fictional villain in the DC Comics universe, associated with Nebula Man

== See also ==
- Little Boy Blue (disambiguation)
- Blue Boy (disambiguation)
- The Boy in Blue (disambiguation)
