= The Boy in Blue =

The Boy in Blue or The Boys in Blue may refer to:

- The Boy in Blue (1919 film), a lost film directed by F. W. Murnau
- The Boy in Blue (1986 film), a film starring Nicolas Cage
- The Boys in Blue, a 1982 British comedy film

== See also ==
- Boy Blue (disambiguation)
- Blue Boy (disambiguation)
- Girl in Blue (disambiguation)
