= Dirty Dingus Magee =

1970 film by Burt Kennedy

- Theatrical release poster
- Directed by: Burt Kennedy
- Screenplay by: Tom Waldman; Frank Waldman; Joseph Heller
- Based on: The Ballad of Dingus Magee; 1965 novel by David Markson
- Produced by: Burt Kennedy
- Starring: Frank Sinatra; George Kennedy; Anne Jackson; Jack Elam; John Dehner
- Cinematography: Harry Stradling Jr.
- Edited by: William B. Gulick
- Music by: Jeff Alexander
- Distributed by: Metro-Goldwyn-Mayer
- Release date: November 18, 1970
- Running time: 91 minutes
- Country: United States
- Language: English

Dirty Dingus Magee is a 1970 American comedy revisionist Western film starring Frank Sinatra as the titular outlaw and George Kennedy as a sheriff out to capture him. Directed by Burt Kennedy, the movie was based on the novel The Ballad of Dingus Magee by David Markson and the screenplay was partly written by Joseph Heller.

== Plot ==
Hoke Birdsill rides into Yerkey's Hole demanding the law take action because Dingus Magee has robbed him. Since no law exists, the mayor, Belle, who also runs the town's bordello, sees to it that Hoke himself becomes the new sheriff. Dingus keeps getting away with his crimes, helped by Anna Hot Water, his young Indian companion, but when he tries to steal from Belle, he finds Hoke has beaten him to it. Hoke enjoys being on the other side of the law, so Dingus turns the tables, becoming sheriff to go after him. After being rivals for so long, Dingus and Hoke eventually team up, running out of town with all Belle's loot after setting fire to her brothel as a distraction.

== Cast ==
- Frank Sinatra as Dingus Magee
- George Kennedy as Hoke Birdsill
- Anne Jackson as Belle Nops
- Lois Nettleton as Prudence Frost
- Jack Elam as Wesley Hardin (spoofing real-life outlaw John Wesley Hardin)
- Michele Carey as Anna Hot Water
- John Dehner as General George
- Henry Jones as Reverend Green
- Harry Carey, Jr. as Charles Stuart
- Paul Fix as Chief Crazy Blanket
- Terry Wilson as the unnamed Sergeant

== Production ==
Kennedy signed the deal to rewrite the script, produce and direct in August 1969. The film was shot in Arizona. Kennedy says James Aubrey of MGM wanted the director to fire Anne Jackson but Kennedy refused. Filming took place in February and March 1970.

Kennedy later gave the film as an example of the movie that does not work because "everyone was a comic and there was no straight man - except the audience who didn't think it was funny."

== Reception ==
Roger Ebert of the Chicago Sun-Times gave a negative review: "I lean toward blaming Frank Sinatra, who in recent years has become notorious for not really caring about his movies. If a shot doesn't work, he doesn't like to try it again; he might be late getting back to Vegas. What's more, the ideal Sinatra role requires him to be in no more than a fourth of the scenes, getting him lots of loot and top billing while his supporting cast does the work."
