= Gilbert Sorrentino =

American writer

- Born: April 27, 1929; Brooklyn, New York
- Died: May 18, 2006 (aged 77); Brooklyn, New York
- Education: Brooklyn College
- Occupations: Novelist; writer; critic; professor
- Children: Jesse; Delia; Christopher
- Writing career
- Genre: Fiction

Gilbert Sorrentino (April 27, 1929 – May 18, 2006) was an American novelist, short story writer, poet, literary critic, professor, and editor.

In over twenty-five works of fiction and poetry, Sorrentino explored the comic and formal possibilities of language and literature. His insistence on the primacy of language and his forays into metafiction mark him as a postmodernist, but he is also known for his ear for American speech and his attention to the particularities of place, especially of his native Brooklyn.

== Life ==
Sorrentino was born in Brooklyn, New York, in 1929. He grew up in the borough's Bay Ridge neighborhood and attended Brooklyn College before and after serving in the United States Army Medical Corps during the Korean War. In 1956, Sorrentino founded the literary magazine Neon with friends from Brooklyn College, including childhood friend Hubert Selby Jr. He edited Neon from 1956 to 1960, then served as editor for Kulchur from 1961 to 1963. After working closely with Selby on the manuscript of Last Exit to Brooklyn (1964), Sorrentino was an editor at Grove Press from 1965 to 1970, where one of his editorial projects was The Autobiography of Malcolm X.

Sorrentino's first marriage, to the former Elsene Wiessner, ended in divorce. The disintegration of their marriage is fictionalized in Sorrentino's first novel, The Sky Changes. They had two children, Jesse (1954–2026) and Delia (1957–2002). In 1968, Sorrentino married Victoria Ortiz. Their son, Christopher Sorrentino, is the author of the novels Sound on Sound, Trance, The Fugitives, and a non-fiction book Now Beacon, Now Sea: A Son's Memoir.

He eventually took up positions at Sarah Lawrence College, Columbia University, the University of Scranton and the New School for Social Research in New York before being hired as a professor of English at Stanford University, where he taught from 1982 to 1999. Although Sorrentino never finished his degree, the head of Stanford's writing program opined that "Sorrentino is a very learned man – we weren't for a second concerned about a Good Housekeeping seal of approval." Sorrentino's students included the writers Ammiel Alcalay, Trey Ellis, Jeffrey Eugenides, Nicole Krauss, Tom Lecky, Eugene Lim, and Jenny Offill.

Following his retirement from Stanford, Sorrentino returned to Bay Ridge, where he lived for the remainder of his life. He died in Brooklyn on May 18, 2006.

== Writing ==
Sorrentino's first novel, The Sky Changes, was published in 1966. Notable among his many other novels are Imaginative Qualities of Actual Things, Blue Pastoral, and Mulligan Stew. The latter novel, a humorous postmodern romp, riffs on the metafictional possibilities introduced in Flann O'Brien's novel At Swim-Two-Birds, and is one of Sorrentino's most popular works. His 1980 novel, Abberation of Starlight, was a finalist for the PEN/Faulkner award and the first book the editor Gary Fisketjon ever acquired.

His 1999 novel, Gold Fools, is written entirely in interrogative sentences not, as critic Steven Moore says, "just to see if he could pull it off, but because he wanted to interrogate our cultural assumptions about the Old West."

In 2010 a posthumous novel, The Abyss of Human Illusion, was published by Coffee House Press with a preface by Christopher Sorrentino.

== Honors and awards ==
Sorrentino was the recipient of numerous awards and honors, including Guggenheim Fellowships in Fiction in 1973 and 1987, the John Dos Passos Prize for Literature (1981), PEN/Faulkner Award finalist in 1981 and 2003, the Mildred and Harold Strauss Livings of the American Academy of Arts and Letters (declined, 1982), the American Academy of Arts and Letters Award for Literature (1985), the Lannan Literary Award for Fiction (1992), and the Lannan Lifetime Achievement Award in 2005. In 2020, Community Board 10 and the New York City Parks Department named a section of Leif Erickson Park, in Bay Ridge, after Sorrentino.

== Bibliography ==
=== Fiction ===
- The Sky Changes (1966)
- Steelwork (1970)
- Imaginative Qualities of Actual Things (1971)
- Splendide-Hôtel (1973)
- Flawless Play Restored: The Masque of Fungo (1974)
- Mulligan Stew (1979)
- Aberration of Starlight (1980)
- Crystal Vision (1981)
- Blue Pastoral (1983)
- Odd Number (1985)
- Rose Theatre (1987)
- Misterioso (1989)
- Under the Shadow (1991)
- Red the Fiend (1995)
- Gold Fools (1999)
- Little Casino (2002)
- The Moon in its Flight (short fiction, 2004)
- Lunar Follies (2005)
- A Strange Commonplace (2006)
- The Abyss of Human Illusion (2010)

=== Novella ===
- A Beehive Arranged on Humane Principles (1986)

=== Poetry ===
- The Darkness Surrounds Us (1960)
- Black and White (1964)
- The Perfect Fiction (1968)
- Corrosive Sublimate (1971)
- A Dozen Oranges (1976)
- White Sail (1977)
- Sulpiciae Elegidia: Elegiacs of Sulpicia (1977) (Translator)
- The Orangery (1978)
- Selected Poems 1958–1980 (1981)
- New and Selected Poems 1958–1998 (2004)

=== Criticism ===
- Something Said (1984; expanded second edition 2001)
