= Paul Sayer =

English author

Paul Sayer (born 4 October 1955, South Milford, near Leeds) is an English author. His first novel, The Comforts of Madness won the 1988 Whitbread Award for both Best First Novel, and Book of the Year.

== Life ==
Born in South Milford near Leeds, Sayer has lived in and around York since the age of 18. He was working as a psychiatric nurse in Clifton Hospital in York whilst writing his first prizewinning novel. Drawing on his own experiences, The Comforts of Madness is a first-person account of a speechless, catatonic patient in a hospital therapy unit. Over the next few years, with his work appearing in ten languages, he went on to write five further novels, including the Booker Prize 'long-listed' 'The Absolution Game'. But the last of these, Men in Rage, published in 1999 did not sell well and as he explains to The Press (York), he became disillusioned and gave up writing, eventually ending up working as a cleaner in a school. There, he was inspired to write again, producing a novel about adolescence, Like So Totally, which was published in 2010 with help from The Wingate Foundation. He now lives in Haxby. Following a long-standing renal complaint, he received a kidney transplant in 2011, and in 2014 his novel about the highwayman Dick Turpin, The True Adventures of Richard Turpin, was published. He has also worked as a fellow for the Royal Literary Fund at Leeds and York Universities.

== Bibliography ==
- The Comforts of Madness (1988)
- Howling at the Moon (1990)
- The Absolution Game (1992)
- The Storm-bringer (1994)
- The God Child (1996)
- Men in Rage (1998)
- Like So Totally (2010)
- The True Adventures of Richard Turpin (2014)
- The Perils of Sanity (2021)
