= Al-Washm Region =

Historical region in Najd, Saudi Arabia

Al-Washm منطقة الوشم
- Historical region
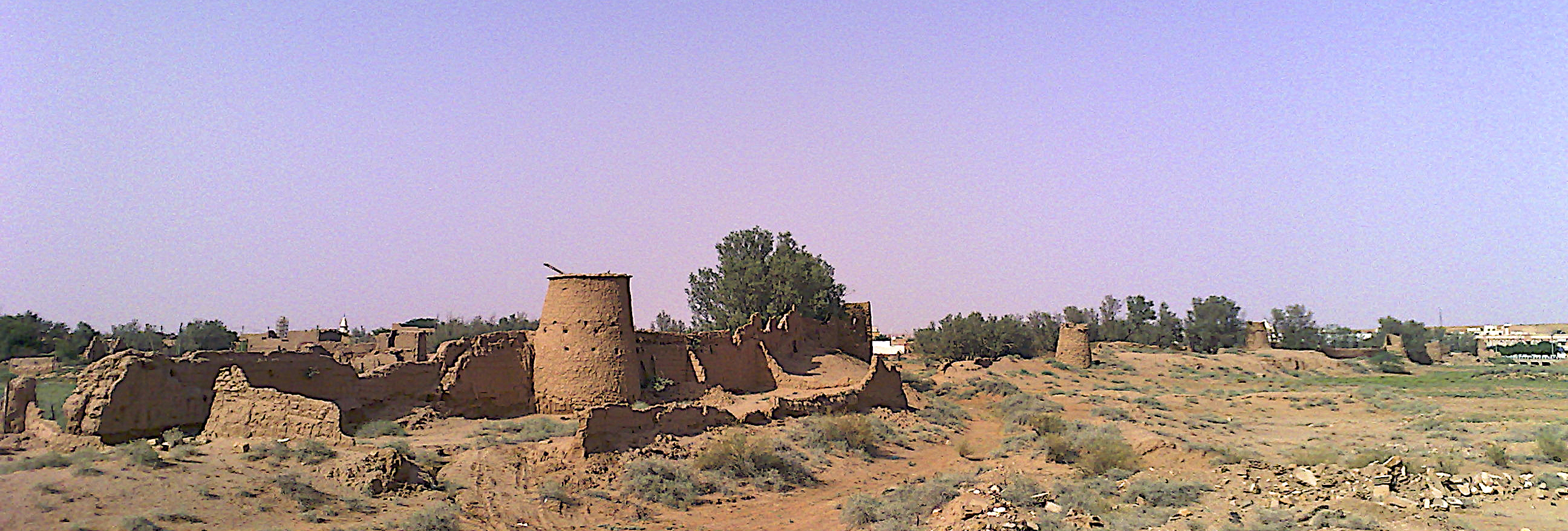
- Shaqra Old City Wall
- Country: Saudi Arabia
- Region: Najd
- Seat: Shaqra

Government
  - Governor: Adel Al-Bawardi

Al-Washm Region (Arabic: منطقة الوشم Minṭaqat al-washm [alwasˈshˤim], local Najdi Arabic pronunciation:, also spelled Washm, or Al-Washim, is a historical region of Najd in central Saudi Arabia.

== Etymology ==
Washm means tattoo in Arabic. Researchers suggested that Al-Washm has been named due to the scattered farms which looks similar to a tattoo.

== History ==
The exact history of the Al-Washm Region is unknown. However, the Umayyad poet Ziyad bin Munfidh around the year 100 AH had passed over Shaqra and mentioned it in his poem.

== Location ==
Al-Washm Region is located about 190 kilometers north-west of the capital Riyadh.

== Towns ==
Al-Washm Region includes Marat, Al Faraah, Al Qasab, Shaqra, Tharmada, Ushaiger, and Uthaithiah.
