= Martin Auer =

Austrian writer

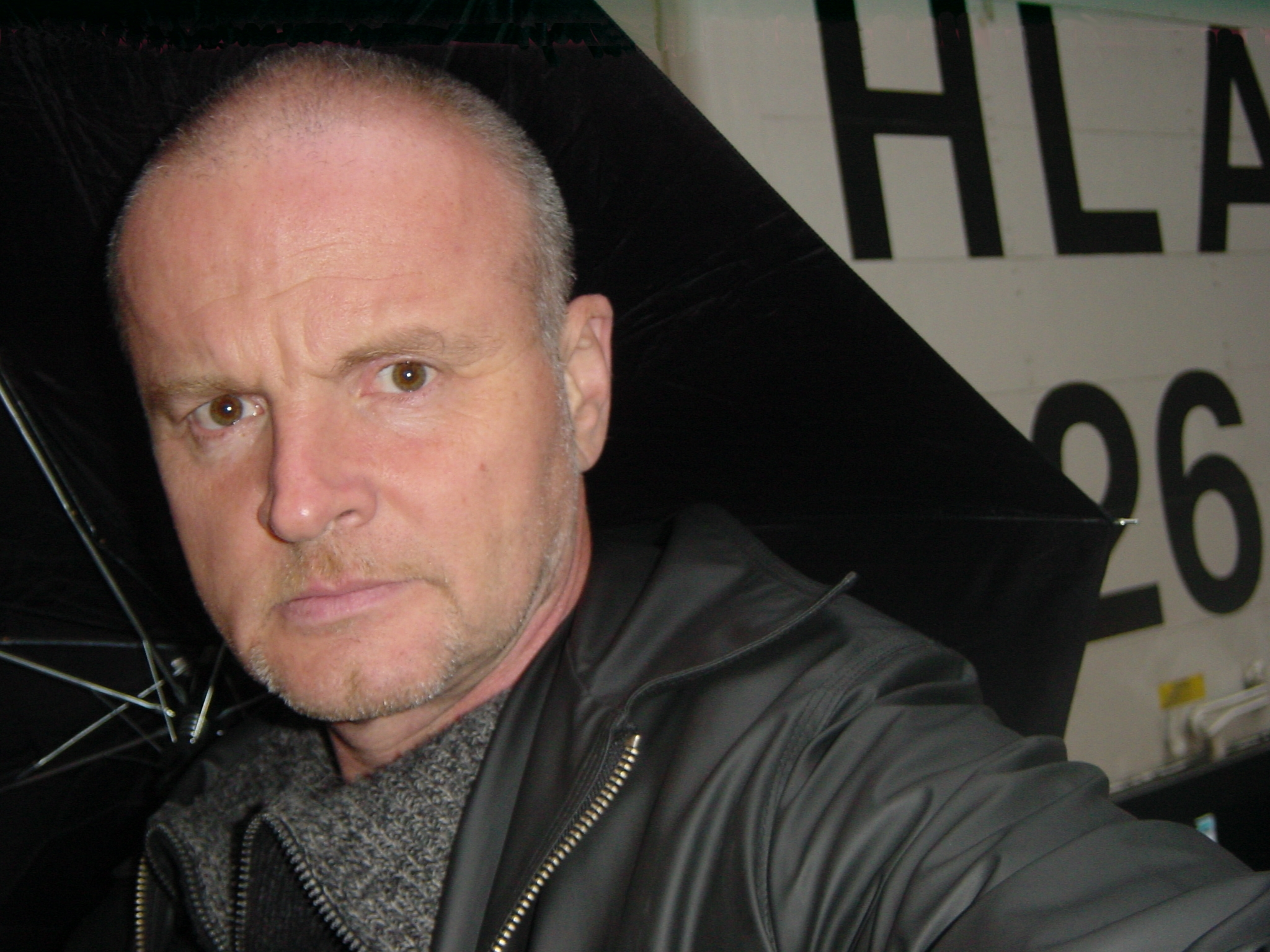
Martin Auer

Martin Auer is an Austrian writer.

He was born in Vienna in 1951. After finishing school, he started but never finished the study of German and History. He was an actor, a singer-songwriter, a journalist, and a magician, before he published his first book in 1986. Since then, he has published more than 40 titles, about two thirds for children. He has been awarded several prizes, among them the Austrian National Prize for Children's Literature in 1994, 1998, and 2000. He has been nominated for the Hans Christian Andersen Medal in 1997, and has been made an Honorary Professor in 2005.

His book, Der seltsame Krieg (The Strange War), is available on the Internet in more than 20 languages. In print, it has been published in German (ISBN 3 407 78436 8), Korean, Persian (ISBN 964 7418 55 8), and Arabic (ISBN 977 304 102 6).

Since 2002, Martin Auer has been a regular contributor to New Delhi's Parenting magazine.

== Works translated in English ==
- Now, Now, Markus, or, I Need a Bird (illustrated by Simone Klages) ISBN 1-55037-092-8
- The Blue Boy (illustrated by Simone Klages) ISBN 0-02-707610-5
