= Thomas Owen Beachcroft =

British writer

Thomas Owen (T. O.) Beachcroft
- Born: 9 March 1902; Clifton, Bristol
- Died: 11 December 1988 (aged 86); Ware, Hertfordshire
- Occupation: Writer
- Spouse: Marjorie Taylor
- Children: Nina Beachcroft

Thomas Owen (T. O.) Beachcroft (9 March 1902 – 11 December 1988) was born in Clifton, Bristol. His father, Richard, was a schoolmaster. Beachcroft graduated Balliol College, Oxford and moved to London, where he first went to work as a copywriter with the Paul E. Derrick Advertising Agency. He married Marjorie Taylor in 1926 and they had one daughter, Nina, who later became a writer of children's fantasy novels.

Beachcroft began by writing poetry, which he shared with T. S. Eliot, who found them "very skillful ... but candidly I do not see what can be done with them at the moment.". He wrote several critical essays that Eliot published in The Criterion in the early 1930s, then began concentrating on short stories, which he often wrote while riding London buses to and from his work at the Unilever Advertising Service. His first collection, A Young Man in a Hurry and Other Stories, was published in 1934. It included the story, "Iodide in Hut C," which New York Times reviewer Eda Lou Walton called "one of the most skillfully plotted stories I have read" and William Rose Benét rated as "one that Rudyard Kipling would have been proud to sign in the days when his fame was in the making."

His second collection, You Must Break Out Sometimes and Other Stories, published in 1936, was his most critically acclaimed. Writing in The Spectator, Graham Greene estimated that "Mr. Beachcroft is likely to become, after Mr. H. E. Bates, the most distinguished short-story writer in this country," and in The New Masses, T. C. Wilson called Beachcroft "one of the ablest of the younger English writers.". In New York Times, reviewer Eda Lou Walton wrote that "One wishes Mr. Beachcroft would write a novel, for these tales promise a work on a far larger scale."

His first novel, The Man Who Started Clean, which told the story of a young man who had to recover his identity after a traumatic head injury in an automobile accident was published in 1937, the reviews were only mildly positive. In The Spectator, Kate O'Brien wrote that "It is all very carefully written—and nothing is missed or left out except that imaginative drive or passion which might have made a magnificent problem out of what is in fact only a neat piece of invention," and The New York Times reviewer assessed that Beachcroft had created "[T]he skeleton for an excellent (if unusual) novel, but a novel, like a man, requires more than a skeleton, and the book as a whole is disappointing." O'Brien also gave his third short story collection, The Parents Left Alone (1940) a mixed review, writing that while his prose "... is lucid and restrained," it also "makes one marvel at his failure to criticise and blue-pencil his work."

Beachcroft took a break from fiction to work as Chief Overseas Publicity Officer for the BBC, where he wrote a series of talks collected in Calling All Nations (1942). The Bodley Head published a selection of stories from his first three collections as Collected Stories of T. O. Beachcroft in 1946, and he continued to work in the genre after that. Of his 1947 collection, Malice Bites Back, Stevie Smith wrote, "Simplicity is the word for Mr. Beachcroft's stories, but it is a poet's simplicity, the most subtle in the world." In 1949, he began working for the British Council as general editor of their series, "Writers and Their Work." Ten years after leaving this position, he wrote a two-volume book for the series, The English Short Story (1964). By the time he published his last collection, Goodbye, Aunt Hester in 1955, his work was considered admirable but passé. Writing in Encounter, Hilary Corke called Beachcroft "an excellent writer in his class—entertaining, ingenious, sensible, inoffensive."

== Works ==
Short Stories

- A Young Man in a Hurry and Other Stories, 1934
- You Must Break Out Sometimes and Other Stories, 1936
- The Parents Left Alone and Other Stories, 1940
- Collected Stories, 1946
- Malice Bites Back, 1947
- Goodbye, Aunt Hester, 1955

Novels

- The Man Who Started Clean, 1937
- Asking For Trouble, 1948
- A Thorn for the Heart, 1952

Nonfiction

- Calling All Nations (BBC broadcast talks), 1942
- British Broadcasting, 1946
- The English Short Story I and II, 1964
- The Modest Art: A Survey of the Short Story in English, 1968
