= The Inner Room =

1898 poem by Arthur Conan Doyle

"The Inner Room" is a poem by Arthur Conan Doyle, first published in his 1898 poetry collection Songs of Action. Unlike most of Doyle's poetry, the poem is "a deeply personal, highly introspective effort," which has been interpreted as "describing the various battles within [Doyle's] mind."

The poem describes Doyle's "inner room"—his own brain or soul—as being inhabited by several different individuals. In Doyle's own words, these "describ[e] our multiplex personality." Discussing the poem, Doyle's biographer Daniel Stashower observes that Doyle "conceived of his own personality as a 'motley company' of conflicting impulses, each represented by a different character—a soldier, a priest, an agnostic—and all of them struggling for control of his soul." Another biographer, Martin Booth, describes this "intensely serious" poem as "fascinating, for it lays bare the powers that [Doyle] believes were in him, eternally fighting to get the upper hand on his soul."

The poem's fifth stanza introduces "a stark-faced fellow, / Beetle-browed, / Whose black soul shrinks away / From a lawyer-ridden day, / And has thoughts he dare not say / Half avowed." Stashower describes this as "quite possibly the most personal and revealing line Conan Doyle ever wrote," perhaps reflecting the difficulties of Doyle's personal life in the mid-1890s.

"At the end of the poem, Doyle resigns himself to what he is." He suggests that none of the competing personalities will prevail over the others. Instead, "if each shall have his day, / I shall swing and I shall sway / In the same old weary way / As before."

== Text ==
It is mine—the little chamber,
Mine alone.
I had it from my forbears
Years agone.
Yet within its walls I see
A most motley company,
And they one and all claim me
As their own.

There's one who is a soldier
Bluff and keen;
Single-minded, heavy-fisted,
Rude of mien.
He would gain a purse or stake it,
He would win a heart or break it,
He would give a life or take it,
Conscience-clean.

And near him is a priest
Still schism-whole;
He loves the censer-reek
And organ-roll.
He has leanings to the mystic,
Sacramental, eucharistic;
And dim yearnings altruistic
Thrill his soul.

There's another who with doubts
Is overcast;
I think him younger brother
To the last.
Walking wary stride by stride,
Peering forwards anxious-eyed,
Since he learned to doubt his guide
In the past.

And 'mid them all, alert,
But somewhat cowed,
There sits a stark-faced fellow,
Beetle-browed,
Whose black soul shrinks away
From a lawyer-ridden day,
And has thoughts he dare not say
Half avowed.

There are others who are sitting,
Grim as doom,
In the dim ill-boding shadow
Of my room.
Darkling figures, stern or quaint,
Now a savage, now a saint,
Showing fitfully and faint
Through the gloom.

And those shadows are so dense,
There may be
Many—very many—more
Than I see.
They are sitting day and night
Soldier, rogue, and anchorite;
And they wrangle and they fight
Over me.

If the stark-faced fellow win,
All is o'er!
If the priest should gain his will
I doubt no more!
But if each shall have his day,
I shall swing and I shall sway
In the same old weary way
As before.
