= The Blue Boy (picture book) =

1991 picture book by Martin Auer

- First edition (German)
- Author: Martin Auer
- Original title: Der blaue Junge
- Illustrator: Simone Klages
- Language: German
- Genre: Picture book
- Publisher: Beltz & Gelberg; Gollancz (UK)
- Publication date: 1991
- Publication place: Germany
- English publication date: 1992
- Media type: Print (paperback)
- ISBN: 0-575-05302-X
- OCLC: 59898436

The Blue Boy is a children's picture book by Martin Auer, with illustrations by Simone Klages. It was first published in 1991 in German as Der blaue Junge.

== Plot summary ==
The Blue Boy lives on a war-torn planet. When his parents get killed he does not want to love anyone anymore, because he has cried so much that he has no more tears left. He declines the company of a little dog, an old woman, and a girl. Instead, he builds himself a giant armoured robot to travel around in and starts looking for someone who cannot be killed by a gun. At last he meets an old man on the moon who cannot be killed by guns because there are no guns up there. But the Blue Boy has brought his gun with him. Only when the old men offers him to use his telescope to study the people down there on the blue planet and to find out why they fight wars and how this could be stopped he agrees to drop his gun so he can stay with the old man. "Who knows? Maybe he'll fly back one day and tell his people everything he's learned".

== Background ==
The original was also translated into Japanese. An American English translation was published in 1992 by Macmillan.

Martin Auer first wrote the story for the German television series Siebenstein (ZDF). It was then published in book form by Beltz & Gelberg. The story is also part of the collection The Strange War by Martin Auer that has been translated in more than 25 languages.
