= Mary La Chapelle =

American short story writer

- Born: Milwaukee, Wisconsin, U.S.
- Occupation: Short story writer
- Education: University of Minnesota; Vermont College of Fine Arts (MFA)
- Notable awards: Whiting Award (1988)

Mary La Chapelle is an American short story writer.

== Early life and education ==
Mary La Chapelle was born in Milwaukee, Wisconsin, U.S.

She graduated from the University of Minnesota, and from Vermont College with an MFA.

== Career ==
As of March 2026 La Chapelle teaches at Sarah Lawrence College.

Her work has appeared in Lumina, Nimrod, Northern Lit Review, Redbook, and First.

== Recognition and awards ==
La Chapelle has received fellowships from the Hedgebrook, Katherine Anne Porter, Edward Albee, and Bush Foundations.

- 1988: Whiting Award
- PEN/Nelson Algren Award
- American Library Association Award
- Loft Mcknight Award

== Works ==
- House of Heroes and Other Stories. Vintage Books. 1990. ISBN 978-0-679-72457-5.
