= Robna Kuća Sarajka =

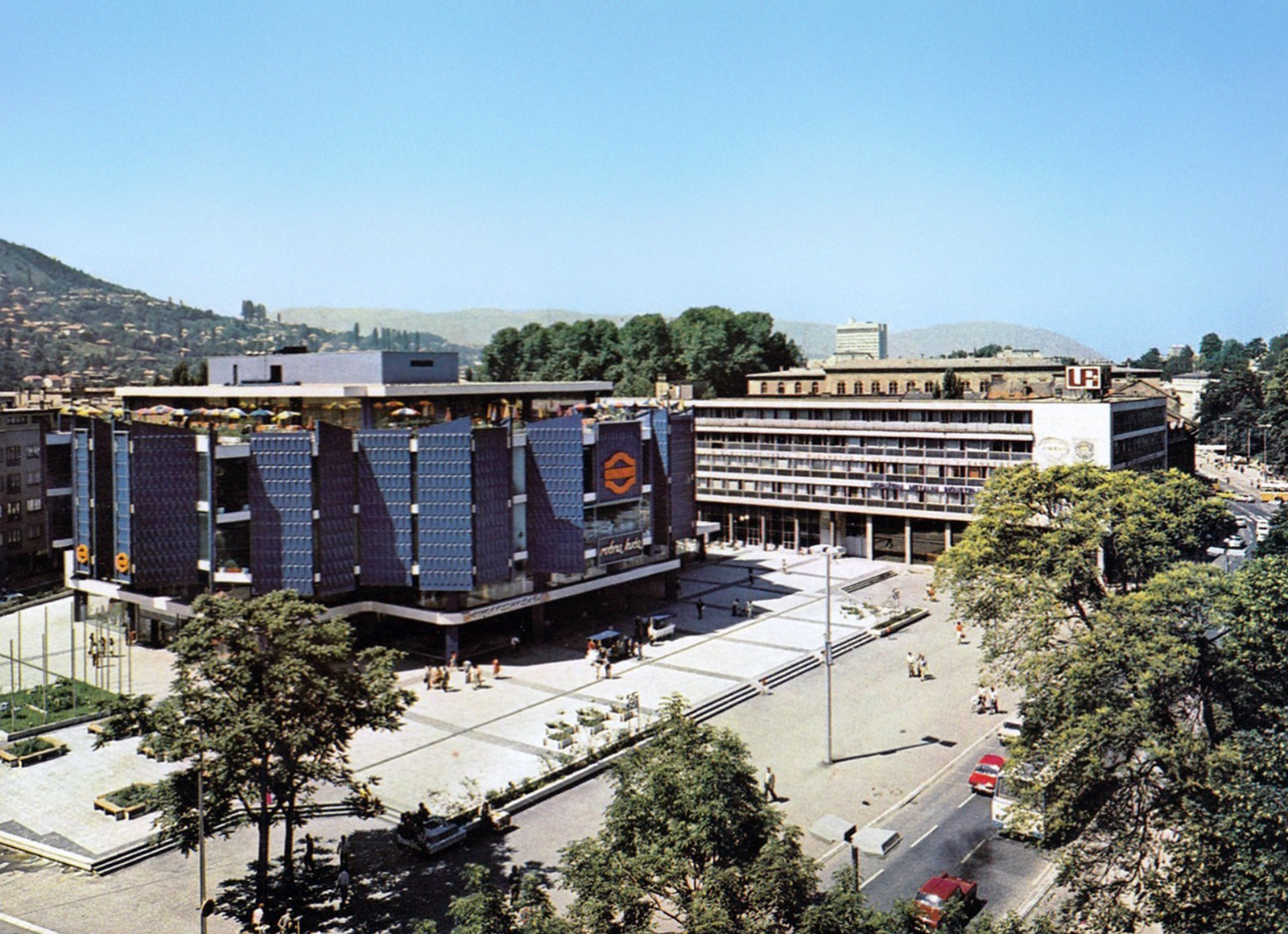
Robna Kuća Sarajka in 1975

Robna Kuća Sarajka (Department Store Sarajka) was a large department store that opened on 6 April 1975. It was heavily damaged during the Siege of Sarajevo from 1992 to 1995. The abandoned store was demolished in 2007. The decision to rebuild was made by owner BBI Real Estate. The new building opened on 6 April 2009. The old department store was nicknamed Blue Girl because of its Blue-ish design described by the Yugoslav Sarajevans. On 14 April 2017, The Historical Archive of Sarajevo had added the DP Sarajka on their site as an archive building.

== Design ==
The total useful surface of 17,111 square meters, 11,000 square meters have been allocated. On five floors, the complex had a sale area with 16 departments, a supermarket, a snack bar, restaurant, wardrobe, management, dispatching and mechanical center, loan department, storage, shelter and manipulative space. The facility has 500 employees. The building has escalators and freight lifts.

According to the first director of "Unime", Nezir Muzur, the store introduced many new items to Sarajevans. He stated, "For the first time since the existence of the capital city of Bosnia and Herzegovina, it is possible for its inhabitants to supply all the goods to the necessary family in one place."
