= Blue Boys (Danish band) =

Danish vocal quartet

Blue Boys were a Danish vocal quartet of the 1960s. Their best known songs included: "Ud på flisen Karoline" (1958), "Oppe på bjerget" (1954), "Skraldemand han tar skraldet" (1959), "Hvem har lånt min gamle hat" (1958) and "Falleri Fallera" (1954).
