= Vanishing Point (Canning novel) =

- First edition (publ. Heinemann)
- Author: Victor Canning
- Language: English
- Publication date: 1982

Vanishing Point is a 1982 novel by Victor Canning.

This is one of Canning's last books and is lively and entertaining. The central character, Maurice Crillon, is a French art forger who suddenly discovers that he is the son of an English baronet. His father gives him a picture, which turns out to be a dangerous burden and involves him in a pursuit through Switzerland, Italy and France.

It could be said that the villains are never quite villainous enough to generate real suspense. Canning as usual relishes descriptions of rural England and his beloved France.
