= This Is Not a Novel =

2001 Postmodern novel by David Markson

- Publisher's book jacket
- Author: David Markson
- Language: English
- Subject: Annotations, Characters and characteristics in literature, Novel writing
- Genre: Experimental fiction
- Published: 2001
- Publisher: Counterpoint Press
- Media type: Print, E-book
- Pages: 190
- ISBN: 9781582431338
- OCLC: 45015388
- Preceded by: Reader's Block (1996)
- Followed by: Vanishing Point (2004).
- Website: Official website Counterpoint Press

This is Not a Novel is a postmodernist work in book form by David Markson, published by Counterpoint Press in 2001.

== Synopsis ==
According to Publishers Weekly, this work continues Markson's tradition of creating complex works that challenge literary genres. The book's title references works by Magritte and Diderot. Hence, this book features a self-aware persona called "Writer" who has exhaustion with conventional storytelling and character development. Markson employs a non-traditional structure, so that it has the appearance of a commonplace book or writerly notebook, likewise containing multiple short entries per page. However, information is presented in a fragmented, non-narrative format, resulting in a deviation from standard plot and characters devices.

The counter narrative is composed of collections of quotes, odd facts, and trivia focused on historical figures, including writers, artists, composers, and scientists. The authorial presence or persona makes occasional appearances, drawing attention to the work's performative nature. The fragmented entries maintain pacing. The book functions as an idiosyncratic encyclopedia that unites these fragments to explore the intersections of art, intellect, and mortality, drawing comparisons to Ezra Pound's Cantos. According to Laura Miller of The New York Times, reader interest is maintained by instances of historical gossip, puzzles, and professional insults between famous figures such as Michelangelo and George Orwell.

== Themes ==
The collection of epigrammatically styled factoids focus on somber topics, including the specific circumstances of notable historical figures' deaths, their financial struggles, and various unresolved historical anecdotes. Over time the fragments develop consistent themes including art, fame, illness, hygiene, and the specific circumstances surrounding historical figures' deaths. The book functions as an idiosyncratic encyclopedia that unites the fragments to explore the intersections of art, intellect, and mortality, drawing comparisons to Ezra Pound's Cantos.

== Reception ==
Laura Miller, writing for The New York Times says that "Despite its atomized condition, the book does, as Writer hopes, seduce the reader into turning pages. Why it should succeed at that when most other books with the same anti-narrative agenda fail isn't hard to explain. This Is Not a Novel may not be a story, but it is something equally addictive: gossip, with a dash of puzzle. According to Guy Davenport, writing for Harper's Magazine, "Markson's book is 190 pages of interesting words or sentences... They create associations the way soap bubbles pack into cubes and hexagons. Every reader will find a different order hiding in this kaleidoscopic randomness."

Michael Dirda, reviewing this work for The Washington Post says, "This Is Not a Novel memorializes the treasures and detritus of one man's singularly cultured mind... If you don't know Writer's work at all, try This Is Not a Novel. There may be some doubt about exactly what kind of book it is, but not that it's altogether wonderful. Review of Contemporary Fiction's reviewer for this book, Paul Maliszewski, says, "What remains is part commonplace book, part melancholic catalog of loss, part fugue, part epic poem of unnumbered cantos, part portrait of the artist, and, taken as a whole, a great read -- a read really like no other."

== See also ==
- Little Casino by Gilbert Sorrentino
- Reader's Block by David Markson
