= Alina Reyes =

French writer

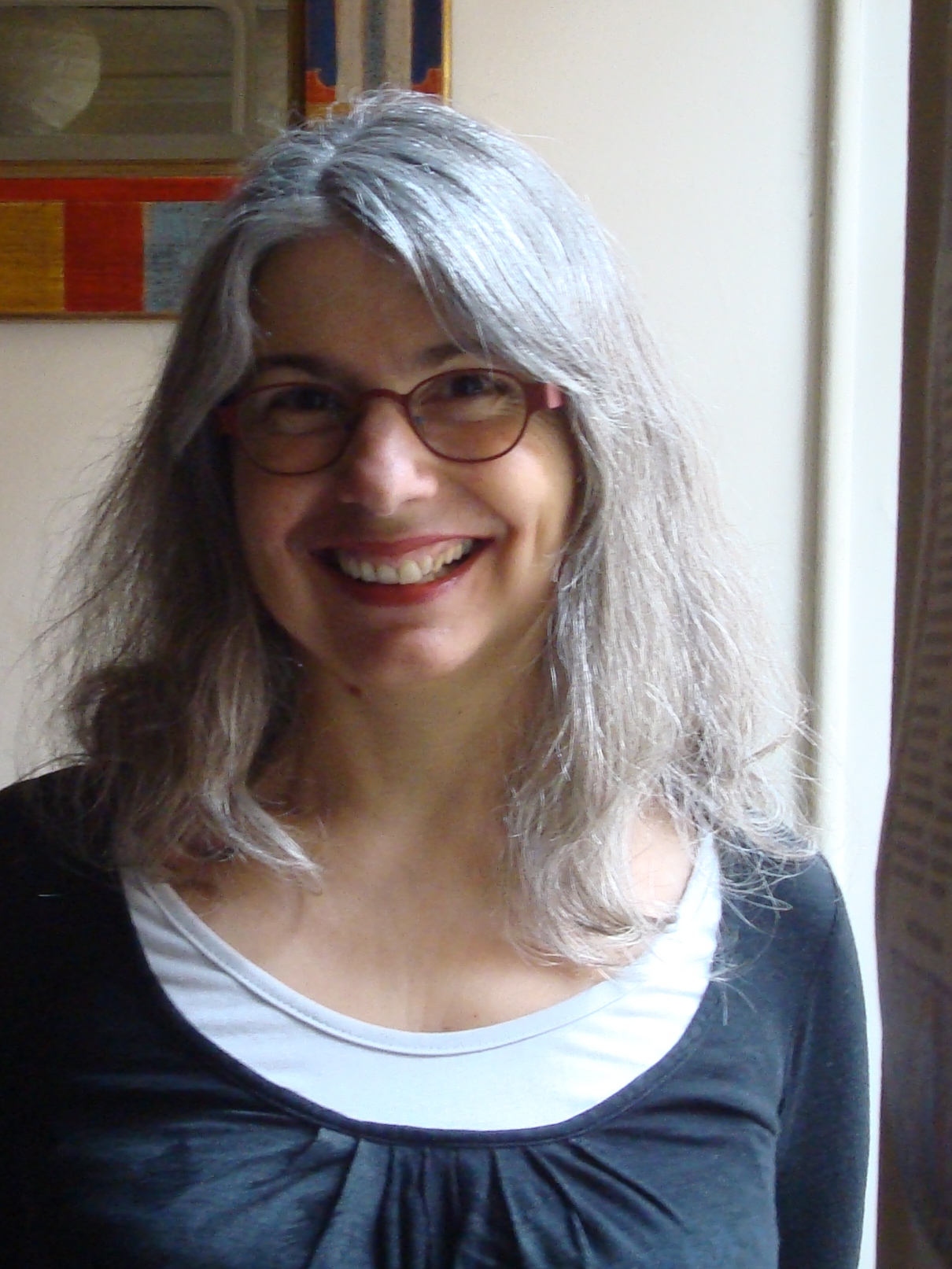
Alina Reyes

Alina Reyes (born Aline Patricia Nardone on 9 February 1956) is a French writer, best known for her literary treatment of eroticism.

== Biography ==
She was born at Bruges, Gironde. Originally a freelance journalist, she devoted herself to fiction after a stay in Montreal. Reyes acquired notoriety with the success of her first novel, The Butcher, which was translated into numerous languages and adapted for the theatre; like many of her subsequent novels and essays, it showed a concern with contemporary eroticism and how to treat it in literary fiction.

She now splits her time between Paris and the Pyrenees.

== Works available in English translation ==
- Le Boucher, 1988 (The Butcher)
- Lucie au long cours, 1990 (Lucie's Long Voyage)
- Au corset qui tue, 1992 (The Fatal Bodice)
- Quand tu aimes, il faut partir, 1993 (When You Love You Must Depart)
- Derrière la porte, 1994 (Behind Closed Doors) — the two parts of this novel have also been published separately as The Sexual Labyrinth and Close Encounters
- Satisfaction, 2002 (Satisfaction)
- Politique de l'amour, 2002, essay (The Politics of Love)
