= Lưu Quang Minh =

- Born: Lưu Quang Minh; 18 May 1988
- Origin: Ho Chi Minh City, Vietnam
- Genres: Pop
- Occupations: Writer, singer, composer
- Website: www.luuquangminh.com

Lưu Quang Minh (born 18 May 1988) is a writer and singer from Vietnam. He became famous when his very first book Gia tai tuoi 20, a short story collection consisting of 20 stories, was published in Vietnam and became popular. He also composed and sang his debut song, "Gia tai tuoi 20", which was based on the short story collection from his book and sharing the same title.

== Early life ==
Minh was born on 18 May 1988 in Ho Chi Minh City, Vietnam. He studied Graphic Design and Industrial Art. He is now living in Ho Chi Minh City. He began writing short stories when he was a teenager.

== Career ==
His very first short story "Co don tren mang" was written in 2007 and published in Women Sunday Magazine. Later, this story became famous online.

His first book Gia tai tuoi 20 was published in March 2010, consisting of 20 stories. This book quickly became popular and attracted attention and acclaim in Vietnam. He also composed and sang his debut song, "Gia tai tuoi 20", which was based on the short story collection from his book and sharing the same title.

Throughout his career, his music has always been based on his own stories, which he writes first, a process which he has called "the interference of music and literature."

He has the YouTube channel named Lưu Quang Minh, and he also posts on TikTok.
