= Blue Girl (film) =

American teen LGBT-related film

Blue Girl is an American drama short film. The film stars Bella Murphy with Adele Rudnick, Ana-Claire Henley, Kabir McNeely, Celeste Caseria and Jamie Uhtof in supporting roles. Set in a virtual homeroom class, the film follows a young high-schooler named Katie who comes out to her class as a lesbian.

== Plot ==
Set in a Zoom homeroom class, a young high school student named Katie comes out as a lesbian. Longing for love and acceptance, she is left defenseless by her teacher Valerie to face a homophobic bully and a disappointed friend.

== Cast ==
- Bella Murphy as Katie, a lesbian high school student
- Adele Rudnick as Mara, a high school bully
- Jamie Uhtof as Valerie, Katie's homeroom teacher
- Ana-Claire Henley as Jenny, one of Katie's friends
- Kabir McNeely as Connor, one of Katie's former friends
- Celeste Caseria as Chloe, a closeted bisexual classmate

Maeve Tuma, Lussi Salmela, Ari Khavin, Olivia Hobbs, Courtney McDanald, Sarah Sevak, Massina Commesso, Vanesa Ferizoli, Emilia Wagner, Safia Ait Hmidane and Daisy Donaldson also feature in minor roles as other classmates.

== Reception ==
=== Critical response ===
Blue Girl received mixed reviews.
