= The Comforts of Madness (novel) =

1988 debut novel of Paul Sayer

- First edition
- Author: Paul Sayer
- Cover artist: Michael Osborn
- Language: English
- Publisher: Constable & Co.
- Publication date: 4 July 1988
- Publication place: United Kingdom
- Media type: Print
- Pages: 128
- ISBN: 0-09-468480-4

The Comforts of Madness is the 1988 debut novel of English author Paul Sayer. It won the 1988 Whitbread Award for both Best First Novel, and Book of the Year. Written while the author was working as a psychiatric nurse in Clifton Hospital in York, and drawing on his own experiences it is a first-person account of a speechless, catatonic patient in a hospital therapy unit.

== Publication ==
In an interview Sayer explains that this was the third novel he had actually written, but, like his earlier efforts, would in all likelihood have gone unpublished had it not won the Constable Trophy, an award given by Yorkshire Arts for 'the best unpublished novel in the North of England'. "I've always thought it highly unlikely that any agent or editor would ever have taken it on, owing to its shortness and dark nature."

== Awards ==
After winning the Whitbread First Novel Award, Sayer was not expecting to win the actual book of the year, where it was up against the hot favourite, Salman Rushdie's The Satanic Verses. " I was already more than satisfied with the book's critical reception and the Whitbread First Novel award, and on the night the overall prize was awarded I was certain I was only there to make up the numbers."

== Reception ==
- Carolyn See writing in the Los Angeles Times highlights the books realism but goes on praise Paul Sayer's imagination as he "creates the inner life of the narrator. Peter, who has been in a catatonic trance for as long as anyone can remember. It is Peter's greatest wish to be left alone: he has never spoken and never will. During the middle part of this harrowing tale, poor, silent, catatonic Peter is hauled out to an experimental treatment center and made to remember his early life." She concludes "There are physicians (I'm sorry to say this but I've met some) who delight in inflicting psychic and physical pain, who treat each illness as if it were a wild animal to be tracked down, tortured and destroyed. It is the patient who is the real victim. It's of this nightmare world that Sayer writes. His prose soars, his message is searing in its implications."
- Jane Vandenburgh in The New York Times likens the novel to Franz Kafka's A Hunger Artist ... "wild, extreme and slightly unbelievable, yet it rings absolutely true"
