= Tharmada =

Town in Saudi Arabia

Coordinates: 25.13068°N 45.49112°E

Tharmada (Arabic: ثرمداء [ALA-LC: Tharmadāʼ]) is a Saudi Arabian town, located about 170 kilometers north of the capital Riyadh.

== Naming ==
The town is named after the plant Altharmad (Halexylon Salicornicum) which abounds in the region.

== See also ==
- List of cities and towns in Saudi Arabia
- Regions of Saudi Arabia
