= Wittgenstein's Mistress =

1988 novel by David Markson

- first edition cover
- Author: David Markson
- Language: English
- Genre: Experimental novel, philosophical fiction, postmodernism
- Publisher: Dalkey Archive Press
- Publication date: May 1988
- Publication place: United States
- Media type: Print
- Pages: 248
- ISBN: 1-56478-211-5 (August, 2005 Reprint Edition)
- OCLC: 17926827

Wittgenstein's Mistress is a 1988 experimental novel written by David Markson. A highly stylized work in the tradition of Samuel Beckett, the novel is mainly a series of statements made in the first person. The protagonist is a woman named Kate who believes herself to be the last human on earth; though her statements shift quickly from topic to topic, the topics often recur, and often refer to Western cultural icons, ranging from Zeno to Beethoven to Willem de Kooning. Readers familiar with Ludwig Wittgenstein's Tractatus Logico-Philosophicus will recognize stylistic similarities to that work.

David Foster Wallace wrote a long essay on the novel detailing its connections with Wittgenstein, entitled "The Empty Plenum: David Markson’s Wittgenstein's Mistress" for the 1990 Review of Contemporary Fiction. In 2012, it was added to the novel as an afterword.

== Allusions ==
Wittgenstein's Mistress is heavy with allusions, references, and parallels right from the title. Several of these include, but are not limited to: Vincent van Gogh, William Gaddis, Ludwig Wittgenstein, Helen of Troy, Achilles, William Shakespeare, and Johannes Brahms. Many of these are used to play with the themes, particularly language and memory, and draw parallels between the narrator, Kate, and figures from other works, most notably Helen of Troy.

== Reception ==
Though Markson's original manuscript was rejected fifty-four times, the book, when finally published in 1988 by Dalkey Archive Press, was met with critical acclaim. In particular, the New York Times Book Review praised it for "address[ing] formidable philosophic questions with tremendous wit." A decade later, David Foster Wallace described it as "pretty much the high point of experimental fiction in this country" in an article for Salon entitled "Five direly underappreciated U.S. novels >1960."

== Release details ==
- 1988, USA, Dalkey Archive Press, May 1988, Hardback
- 1989, UK, Jonathan Cape, ISBN 0-224-02685-2, August 1989, Hardback
- 1990, USA, Dalkey Archive Press, February 1990, Paperback (reprinted twice)
- 1995, USA, Dalkey Archive Press, ISBN 0-916583-50-3, May 1995, Second paperback edition (with afterword by Steven Moore) (reprinted five times)
- 2012, USA, Dalkey Archive Press, ISBN 1-56478-211-5, March 2012, Third paperback edition (with afterword by David Foster Wallace)
