= Vanishing Point (Markson novel) =

2004 novel by David Markson

- Author: David Markson
- Publisher: Shoemaker & Hoard
- Publication date: 2004
- Pages: 191
- ISBN: 978-1593760106
- Followed by: The Last Novel

Vanishing Point is an experimental novel by David Markson which was published in 2004.
