= David Markson =

American postmodern novelist

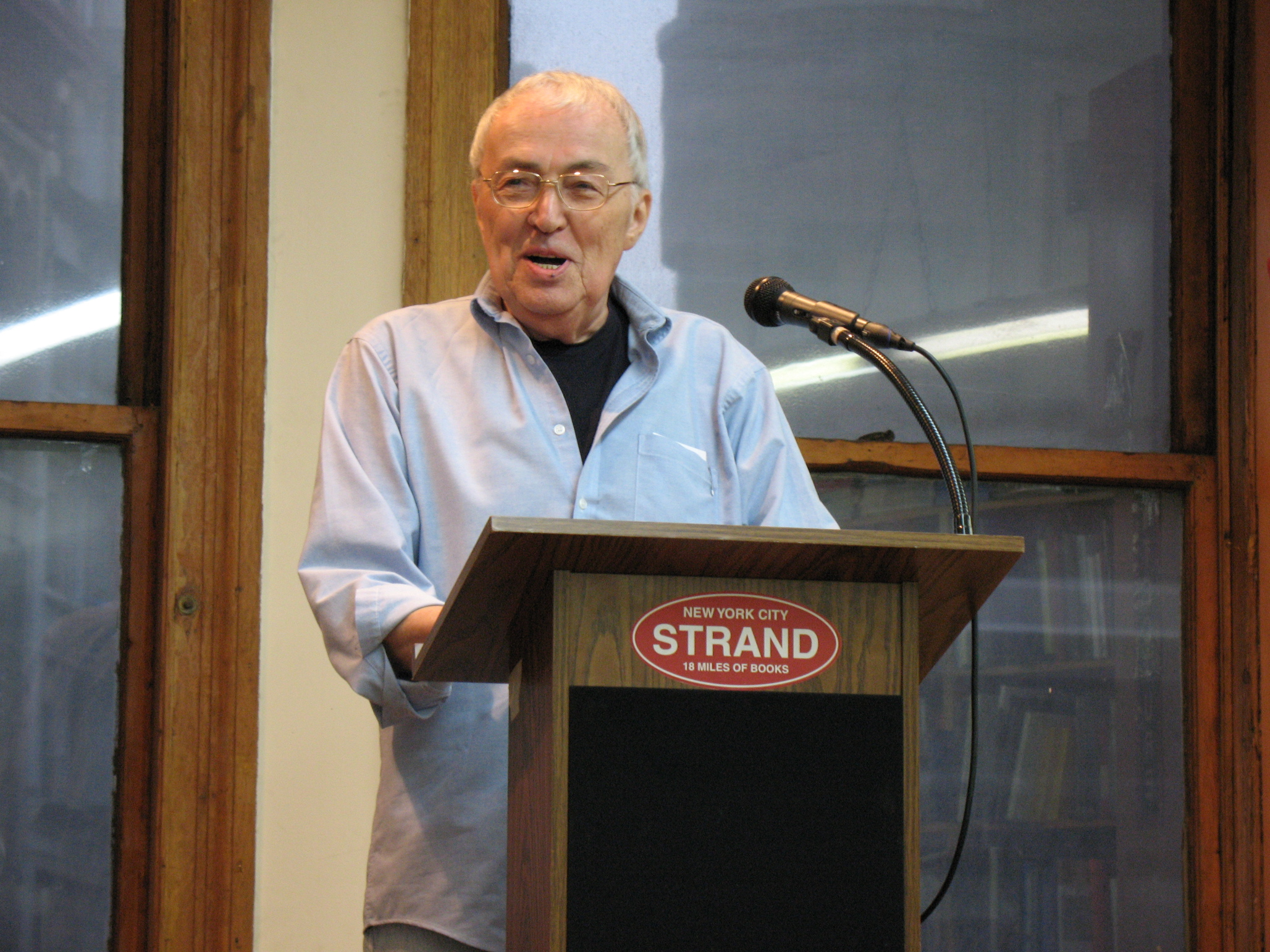
- Markson in September 2007
- Born: December 20, 1927; Albany, New York, U.S.
- Died: (body found) June 4, 2010 (aged 82); Greenwich Village, New York, U.S.
- Education: Columbia University (MA)
- Occupation: Novelist
- Writing career
- Years active: 1956–2007
- Period: Postmodern
- Genre: Experimental fiction
- Notable works: Going Down, Springer's Progress, Wittgenstein's Mistress, Reader's Block, This Is Not A Novel, Vanishing Point, The Last Novel

David Merrill Markson (December 20, 1927 – c. June 4, 2010) was an American novelist. He was the author of several postmodern novels, including Springer's Progress, Wittgenstein's Mistress, Reader's Block and This Is Not a Novel . His final book, The Last Novel, published in 2007, was called "a real tour de force" by The New York Times.

Markson's work is characterized by an unconventional and experimental approach to narrative, character development and plot. The late writer David Foster Wallace hailed Wittgenstein's Mistress as "pretty much the high point of experimental fiction in this country". While his early works draw on the modernist tradition of William Faulkner and Malcolm Lowry, his later novels are, in Markson's words, "literally crammed with literary and artistic anecdotes" and "nonlinear, discontinuous, collage-like, an assemblage."

In addition to his output of modernist and postmodernist experimental literature, he published a book of poetry, a critical study of Malcolm Lowry, three crime novels, and an anti-Western, The Ballad of Dingus Magee, adapted into the film Dirty Dingus Magee, starring Frank Sinatra.

== Biography ==
David Merrill Markson was born in Albany, New York, on December 20, 1927. He was of Jewish origin.

Educated at Union College and Columbia University, Markson began his writing career as a journalist and book editor, periodically taking up work as a college instructor at Columbia University, Long Island University, and The New School.

Though his first novel was published in the late 1950s, he did not gain prominence until the late 1980s, when he was over 60 years old, with the publication of Wittgenstein's Mistress. From that point, his reputation as a writer steadily grew, so much so that he told an interviewer: "One of my friends told me to be careful before I become well known for being unknown."

Markson died in New York City, in his West Village apartment where, according to the author's literary agent and former wife Elaine Markson, Markson's two children found him on June 4, 2010, in his bed.

Upon Markson's death, his entire personal library was donated to the Strand Bookstore, according to his wishes.

== Wittgenstein's Mistress ==
Wittgenstein's Mistress, widely considered his masterpiece, was published in 1988 by Dalkey Archive Press. Though Markson's original manuscript was rejected 54 times, the book, when finally published, met with critical acclaim. It is a highly stylized, experimental novel in the tradition of Beckett. The novel is mainly a series of statements made in the first person; the protagonist is a woman who believes herself to be the last human on earth. Though her statements shift quickly from topic to topic, the topics are often recurrent, and often reference Western cultural icons, ranging from Zeno to Beethoven to Willem de Kooning. Readers familiar with Ludwig Wittgenstein's Tractatus Logico-Philosophicus will recognize striking stylistic similarities to that work.

Amy Hempel praised it for "address[ing] formidable philosophic questions with tremendous wit." A decade later, David Foster Wallace described it as "pretty much the high point of experimental fiction in this country" in an article for Salon entitled "Five direly underappreciated U.S. novels >1960."

== Markson's Tetralogy (aka The Notecard Quartet) ==
Markson's late works further refine the allusive, minimalist style of Wittgenstein's Mistress. He hoped that these four novels might eventually be published together in one volume. Thus, critics often discuss them as a tetralogy and, though Markson himself gave no title to this collection of novels, many critics have adopted the name The Notecard Quartet to describe this work as a whole.

Markson described the action of this tetralogy as a character "sitting alone in a bedroom with a head full of everything he’s ever read." Most of the traditional comforts of the novel form are absent, as an author-figure closely identified with Markson himself considers the travails of the artist throughout the history of culture. In Reader's Block, he is called Reader; in This Is Not a Novel, Writer; in Vanishing Point, Author; in Markson's last novel, The Last Novel, he is known as Novelist. His working process involved "scribbling the notes on three-by-five-inch index cards" and collecting them in "shoebox tops" until they were ready to be put "into manuscript form."

The first in the “personal genre,” Reader's Block, was published by Dalkey Archive Press in 1996. It was followed by This Is Not A Novel (Counterpoint, 2001), Vanishing Point (Shoemaker & Hoard, 2004) and The Last Novel (Shoemaker & Hoard, 2007). Of Reader's Block, fellow writer and friend Kurt Vonnegut wrote, "David shouldn’t thank Fate for letting him write such a good book in a time when large numbers of people could no longer be wowed by a novel, no matter how excellent."

The second book, This Is Not a Novel, describes itself in a number of terms:

- "A novel" (p. 18)
- "An epic poem" (p. 21)
- "A sequence of cantos awaiting numbering"(p. 23)
- "A mural of sorts" (p. 36)
- "An autobiography" (p. 53)
- "A continued heap of riddles" (p. 70)
- "A polyphonic opera of a kind" (p. 73)
- "A disquisition on the maladies of the life of art" (p. 86)
- "An ersatz prose alternative to The Waste Land" (p. 101)
- "A treatise on the nature of man" (p. 111)
- "An assemblage [nonlinear, discontinuous, collage-like]" (p. 128)
- "A contemporary variant on [The Egyptian Book of the Dead]" (p. 147)
- "A kind of verbal fugue" (p. 170)
- "A classic tragedy [in many ways]" (p. 171)
- "A volume entitled 'Writer's Block'" (p. 173)
- "A comedy of a sort" (p. 184)
- "His synthetic personal Finnegans Wake" (p. 185)
- "Nothing more than a fundamentally recognizable genre all the while" (p. 189)
- "Nothing more or less than a read"
- "An unconventional, generally melancholy though sometimes even playful now-ending read."

In This Is Not a Novel, the Writer character states, "A novel with no intimation of story whatsoever, Writer would like to contrive" (p. 2). Reader's Block, likewise, calls itself "a novel of intellectual reference and allusion, so to speak minus much of the novel" (p. 61). Rather than consisting of a specific plot, they can be said to be composed of "an intellectual ragpicker's collection of cultural detritus." This seemingly-random set of quotes, ideas, and nuggets of information about the lives of various literary, artistic, and historical figures cohere to form a new kind of novel. Despite their unconventional form and appearance, Markson insisted on calling them "novels."

Though the last three novels of The Notecard Quartet have been published together in one book, This Is Not a Novel and Other Novels, because the first book of the tetralogy was published by a different publisher, the entire quartet of novels has yet to be published together in one collection.

== Works ==
- Epitaph for a Tramp Dell, 1959.
- Epitaph for a Dead Beat Dell, 1961.
- The Ballad of Dingus Magee; Being the Immortal True Saga of the Most Notorious and Desperate Bad Man of the Olden Days, His Blood-Shedding, His Ruination of Poor Helpless Females, & Cetera; also including the Only Reliable Account ever offered to the Public of his Heroic Gun Battle with Sheriff C. L. Birdsill, Yerkey's Hole, New Mex., 1884, and with Additional Commentary on the Fateful and Mysterious Bordello-Burning of the Same Year; and furthermore interspersed with Trustworthy and Shamelessly Interesting Sketches of "Big Blouse" Belle Nops, Anna Hot Water, "Horseface" Agnes, and Others, hardly any Remaining Upright at the End. Composed in the Finest Modern English as taken diligently from the Genuine Archives Bobbs-Merrill, 1965. (Filmed as Dirty Dingus Magee (1970),
- Miss Doll, Go Home Dell, 1965.
- Going Down Holt Rinehart Winston, 1970.
- Springer's Progress Holt, Rinehart & Winston, 1977.
- Malcolm Lowry's Volcano: Myth, Symbol, Meaning Times Books, 1978.
- Wittgenstein's Mistress Dalkey Archive, 1988.
- Collected Poems Dalkey Archive Press, 1993.
- The Notecard Quartet, 1996–2007
  - Reader's Block Dalkey Archive Press, 1996.
  - This Is Not a Novel Counterpoint, 2001.
  - Vanishing Point Shoemaker & Hoard, 2004.
  - The Last Novel Shoemaker & Hoard, 2007.
