= The Woman Destroyed =

1967 novel by Simone de Beauvoir

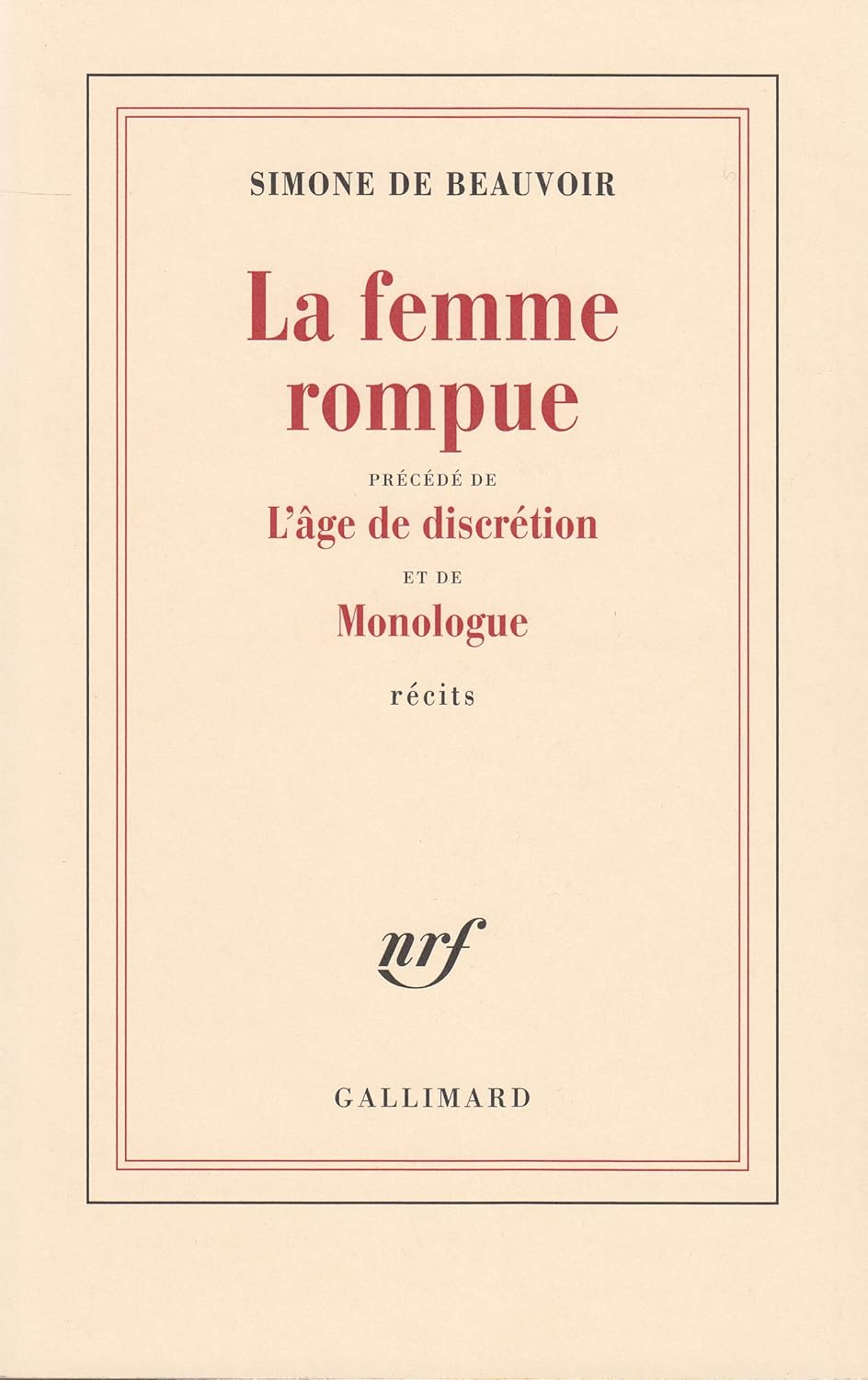
- Author: Simone de Beauvoir
- Genre: Feminist fiction
- Publication date: 1967
- Pages: 256

The Woman Destroyed (French: La Femme rompue) is a collection of three short stories by Simone de Beauvoir, published in 1967 by Éditions Gallimard.The Woman Destroyed is one of Simone de Beauvoir's two short story collections, the other being When Things of the Spirit Come First.

This collection explores women in conflict with their families and husbands. The stories illustrate how women are "destroyed" in their relationships, as well as internal and external factors that may be responsible for that destruction.

The final story, which shares its title with the collection, was originally published serially in the French women's magazine Elle. It was released in 5 installments over the course of four weeks, from October 19 to November 16, 1967. The story was paired with engravings created by Beauvoir's sister, Hélène de Beauvoir, as well as photos of the author.

This collection and Beauvoir's novel Les Belles Images were the last works of fiction she published.

== Plot ==
=== The Age of Discretion ===
In the first story, the narrator is a woman who is coming to terms with her old age while experiencing conflict with her family. The story begins as she waits for a visit from her son, Philippe, a university teacher. After he visits, Philippe discusses the possibility of him quitting the job for something more financially lucrative and practical. Afterward, her husband, Andre, informs the narrator that Philippe has taken a position in the Ministry of Culture.

Initially, the narrator blames Philippe’s wife, Irene, believing that Irene must have influenced Philippe to go against the political values he previously held. The narrator gets into an argument with Philippe over the phone about his decision and tells him they will never see each other again. The narrator believes that the life of an intellectual is more valuable than activities that don't prioritize pursuit of knowledge and is therefore appalled that her son would leave his old job behind so easily.

Andre does not react as strongly to the news, and their different responses lead to arguments between the couple. The story encapsulates the narrator’s struggle with losing control over the course of her own life as well as her family’s actions and decisions.

=== Monologue ===
This story takes the form of a extended monologue delivered by the character Murielle, who expresses grief, fury, and despair over the course her life has taken thus far. Murielle is distraught by Sylvie's, her daughter, suicide and has lost custody of her son, Francis, to her ex-husband. She struggles to maintain a stable relationship with her mother, and she expresses resentment to those who have wronged her in the past. Through a stream-of-consciousness monologue, Murielle reflects on the ways in which she has been let down by her loved ones and society at large.

=== The Woman Destroyed ===
The final short story, which shares it's title with the collection, is presented through Monique's diary entries. Monique is a housewife who has dedicated herself to her marriage and her role as a mother. After her two adult daughters leave home, Monique begins to keep a diary to express her anxiety about her husband, Maurice, who seems to become increasingly distant. Monique proceeds to learn that Maurice has been having an affair with Noëllie. The rest of the story follows Monique's attempts to come to terms with this affair and understand how to address the situation.

== Main characters ==
This collection features three stories about three different women, all experiencing existential crises and questioning their identities. In "The Age of Discretion," the protagonist is an intellectual in her sixties who is politically engaged and holds strong opinions that sometimes make her too uncompromising for those close to her. In "Monologue," the narrator is a woman who has become estranged from her family and finds herself enraged by society. In "The Woman Destroyed," Monique initially identifies herself as a devoted mother and wife. She values human relationships and fulfilling others' needs so completely that she struggles to understand herself without relating her identity to others.

== Main Themes and Analysis ==
The Woman Destroyed was published in a French women's magazine, and focuses on the narratives that centered women's experiences. The collection includes a story written entirely from a female character's first person perspective, further emphasizing Beauvoir's intention of highlighting women's perspectives on their own lives and identities. Combining French academic Elizabeth Fallaize's theories and Beauvoir's commentary on her own work, academic Allison Holland writes that the stories are ultimately all narratives written in bad faith by their narrators, with much more complexity hiding beneath the narrators' understanding of their experiences.

=== The Woman Destroyed ===
Monique initially portrays herself as a housewife who is comfortable with her role in society, until she must confront Maurice's infidelity. Having assumed this traditional role of the housewife, Monique's has very become dependent on the lives of others. She has based her identity on her love for Maurice and her role as a mother. When she discovers Maurice's infidelity and is no longer expected to provide for her now-adult daughters, she struggles to find herself again. Monique devoted herself to her family because she viewed this role as a way to fulfill societal expectations. However, the consequences of this devotion includes a lack of agency, and a lack of understanding of her own identity. Throughout the story, Beauvoir Critiques traditional gender roles in heterosexual relationships, indicating that living as a housewife in a patriarchal society is an act of immanence, and does not lead to proper control over one's life. Through her writing in her diary, Monique strives to reflect and examine her own life, but she continues to struggle to distinguish herself from her role as a housewife. Her circumstances and responses illustrates how women are confined to narrow social roles which do not fulfil their existence. The story also explores how individual responsibility is involved in examining one's choices and cultivating a life of one's own.

Another theme of Beauvoir critiques of women's participation in patriarchy is reflected in Monique's interactions with the other women. Throughout the story, Monique receives little support from the female characters that she goes to for advice. When she does her friends or acquaintances, Monique is told to remain patient and pay little attention to her husband's infidelity. Fallaize writes that Maurice's actions are often discussed in the context of his identity as a man, reinforcing the idea that his choices have unique justifications due to his masculinity. Instead of viewing his infidelity as a breach of trust, Monique's friend, Isabelle, encourages her to understand that men have specific needs and behaviors that their wives must learn to make peace with.

The story's conclusion at first appears to indicate that Monique's suffering and difficulties with her family were all self-inflicted. She reflects on a number of decisions she's come to regret, and Maurice asserts that her commitment to treating her marriage, motherhood, and family affairs as equivalent to a career was exactly what led to everything she finds dissatisfactory about her life. Writing about her original intention behind the story, Beauvoir claims that the main themes were loneliness and failure. On one hand, the beginning few diary entries make it clear that Monique is preoccupied with homemaking and serving others' needs in a way which indicates she does not desire to have much agency over her life. Providing a different perspective on Monique's diary, Holland argues that her entries instead allow her to later reflect on the truth of her experiences, and face the fact that her perceptions of the events were not always entirely accurate. In this way, Monique utilizes writing and language to gain back some control over her narrative, while still recognizing that her point of view is never necessarily the objective truth.

Further examining the significance of Beauvoir's writing choices in the story, Holland notes that devices and themes such as repetition, inconclusiveness, and questioning of definitions become pervasive throughout the latter half of the text. As Monique learns more about the affair between Maurice and Noëllie, and as her interactions with Maurice become more and more cold and painful, she no longer trusts herself to distinguish between true and false, or to recognize the true meanings behind words and phrases. Moreover, Monique often repeats herself in order to express particularly strong feelings, and to emphasize the fact that these developments in her relationship with Maurice are difficult to get her mind off of. Through continuously questioning herself, and reinterpreting the conversations she has had with Maurice, Monique's diary entries represent her attempts at developing self-understanding. Rather than simply serving as a passive outlet for her emotions, her diary in fact allows Monique to work toward understanding herself and her perception of the world more accurately and completely than before.

== Reception ==
Beauvoir was surprised and disappointed by the reception of the collection's final story, "The Woman Destroyed." She remarked that her readers wrote to her complaining that Monique chose to stay with Maurice, and tended to ascribe various positive qualities to her out of identification with the character. However, this can be partially attributed to the status of Elle magazine, and the general predisposition of its readers at the time. As Beauvoir published a story which appeared to fit into the popular genre of magazine romance fiction, her readers read the narrative through a lens which resulted in certain expectations in accordance with that genre. Overall, Fallaize questions whether it's possible for Beauvoir to effectively deliver the ideological message she hopes to get across within the constraints of the romantic fiction genre she chose to do so in. Beauvoir insisted that Monique's diary should be read like a detective story, where one needs to read between the lines and look for clues to piece together a complete understanding of the narrative. While at the time, readers believed Monique to be the "victim" in the narrative, literary critic and Beauvoir scholar Toril Moi interpreted Beauvoir's comment to mean that the story was more complex than such a black-and-white interpretation. Instead, she argued that Monique is not necessarily only a victim of the struggles she faces, but is also complicit in her own victimization.

The story was also reviewed negatively by literary critics. At the time, Beauvoir's writing was classified as "women's writing," which contributed to her work being reviewed as a "novel for shop-girls" by journalist Bernard Pivot. Moreover, the critic expressed disdain for Beauvoir's turn from respectable philosophy to writing in the romance fiction genre. Literary critic Jacqueline Piatier reviewed the short story similarly, claiming that it was comparable to the "agony aunt" column one might find in Elle. In sum, "The Woman Destroyed" was seen as a piece of work which catered to women's interests that are often perceived as frivolous, irrelevant, and not worthy of philosophical thought. However, as the title of the story implies, Beauvoir wished to depict a woman's pain, and expected her to readers take that pain seriously. While she was disappointed that her general audience seemed to overidentify with Monique and therefore gloss over her faults, she was also unsatisfied with the critics' reluctance to engage with Monique's suffering as something worthy of more serious literary analysis.

== Editions ==
- La Femme rompue, Éditions Gallimard, 1967 ; réédition, Gallimard, coll. « Folio » No. 76, 1972 ; réédition, Gallimard, coll. « Folio » No. 960, 1978

== Adaptations ==
English actress, Diana Quick, adapted the story "Monologue" for the stage in 2004, titling it "The Woman Destroyed." The adaptation was directed by Richard Cottrell and performed at the 59E59 theaters in New York.

In France, the collection was adapted for the stage under the title "La Femme rompue: monologue", directed by Steve Suissa, starring Évelyne Bouix, at the Théâtre de l'Atelier (the premiere took place on 5 October 2007). It was then revived in a production directed by Hélène Fillières, starring Josiane Balasko, at the théâtre Hébertot (the premiere took place on 15 February 2018).

Two French films have been made based on the collection: La Femme rompue (1978) by Josée Dayan; and Le Monologue de la femme rompue (1988) by Jacques Doazan with Françoise Lebrun.

The Austrian actress Erika Pluhar performed in the 1980s in the one-woman play Eine gebrochene Frau, Monique's soliloquy, directed by Margarethe Krajanek.
