= The Blood of Others (film) =

- VHS cover
- Based on: The Blood of Others by Simone de Beauvoir
- Screenplay by: Brian Moore
- Directed by: Claude Chabrol
- Starring: Jodie Foster; Michael Ontkean; Sam Neill; Stéphane Audran; Lambert Wilson
- Music by: Matthieu Chabrol; François Dompierre
- Countries of origin: France; Canada; United States
- Original languages: English; German

Production
- Producers: John Kemeny; Denis Héroux; Lamar Card
- Cinematography: Richard Ciupka
- Editors: Monique Fardoulis; Yves Langlois
- Running time: 175 minutes (U.S. TV); 135 minutes (Europe theatrical)
- Production companies: SuperChannel; CTV Television Network; Téléfilm Canada; Antenne 2; Filmax; Films A2; HBO Premiere Films

Original release
- Network: HBO
- Release: August 25, 1984

The Blood of Others (French: "Le sang des autres") is a 1984 drama film directed by Claude Chabrol. It is based on the 1945 novel The Blood of Others by Simone de Beauvoir. The film was originally made as a three-hour English-language television film which debuted on August 25, 1984 on HBO. The film was then edited down by 40 minutes and dubbed into French for a European theatrical release.

== Plot ==
In Nazi occupied France, Jean Blomart sits by a bed in which his lover Hélène lies dying. Through a series of flashbacks, we learn about both characters and their relationship to each other. As a young man filled with guilt about his privileged middle-class life, Jean joins the Communist Party and breaks from his family, determined to make his own way in life. After the death of a friend in a political protest, for which he feels guilty, Jean quits the Party and concentrates on trade union activities. Hélène is a young designer who works in her family's confectionery shop and is dissatisfied with her conventional romance with her fiance Paul. She contrives to meet Jean, and although he initially rejects her, they form a relationship after she has an abortion following a reckless liaison with another man. Jean tells Hélène he loves her even though he believes he does not. He proposes to her and she accepts.

When France enters World War II, Jean, conceding the need for violent conflict to effect change, becomes a soldier. Hélène intervenes against his will to arrange a safe posting for him. Angry with her, Jean breaks their relationship. As the German forces advance towards Paris, Hélène flees and witnesses the suffering of other refugees. Returning to Paris, she briefly takes up with a German who could advance her career, but soon sees what her countrymen are suffering. She also witnesses the roundup of Jews. Securing the safety of her Jewish friend Yvonne leads Hélène back to Jean, who has become a leader in a Resistance group. She is moved to join the group. Jean has reconnected with his father with the common goal to liberate France from Germany. His mother, however, is less impressed by the lives lost to the Resistance.

Hélène is shot in a resistance activity and during Jean's night vigil at her side, he examines his love for Hélène and the wider consequences of his actions. As morning dawns, Hélène dies and Jean decides to continue with acts of resistance.

== Cast ==
- Jodie Foster as Hélène Bertrand
- Michael Ontkean as Jean Blomart
- Sam Neill as Dieter Bergman
- Lambert Wilson as Paul
- Stéphane Audran as Gigi
- Alexandra Stewart as Madeleine
- Jean-François Balmer as Arnaud
- John Vernon as Charles
- Michel Robin as Raoul
- Jean-Pierre Aumont as M. Blomart
- Jean-Yves Berteloot as Coutant Repentigny
- Steven Vidler as Autre Manifestant

== Soundtrack ==
- "C'était écrit"

Composed by Jacques Stern
Lyrics by Jack Meskill
Performed by Maurice Chevalier

- "Ménilmontant"

Written and performed by Charles Trenet

- "À Paris dans chaque Faubourg"

Composed by Maurice Jaubert
Lyrics by René Clair
Performed by Lys Gauty

== Reception ==
From Dennis Schwartz of Ozus' World Movie Reviews, who gave the film a C−:

A poorly done adaptation of Simone de Beauvoir's 1945 novel about the growth and self-sacrifice of a selfish American during the German Occupation of Paris. Claude Chabrol has no feel or interest for the Occupation subject matter, being more of a satirist of the bourgeois he seems like a fish out of water in this venture. His uninspired filming of this routine story and his plodding direction makes this dreary film one of his biggest bombs. If that wasn't bad enough, all the main actors are miscast.
