= Sylvie Le Bon-de Beauvoir =

Adopted daughter of Simone de Beauvoir

Sylvie Le Bon-de Beauvoir (French pronunciation: [silvi lə bɔ̃ də bovwaʁ]) (born 17 January 1941) is the adopted daughter of Simone de Beauvoir. She is a philosophy professor. The meeting between the two women was recounted in the book All Said and Done, which Simone de Beauvoir dedicated to Le Bon.

Le Bon was one of the women that de Beauvoir and Jean-Paul Sartre cared and provided for. Sylvie Le Bon and Simone de Beauvoir met in 1960, when Le Bon was 19 and de Beauvoir was 52.

De Beauvoir legally adopted Le Bon in 1980, making her the sole executor of her will. After the death of Simone de Beauvoir in 1986, Sylvie Le Bon-de Beauvoir published several volumes of Beauvoir's letters.

== Relationship with Simone de Beauvoir ==
Le Bon, a philosophy student, first wrote a fan letter to Beauvoir in high school, at the age of 17. Beauvoir later invited her over when she was a philosophy student in college. In All Said and Done, the book where Beauvoir details the chronology of her relationship with Le Bon, Beauvoir remarks on the “réciprocité” in their relationship and that she viewed Le Bon as someone similar to her–“an intellectual with a passion for life." The relationship that followed was intimate in nature, yet Beauvoir always refused the label of “lesbian.” After being together for 22 years, Beauvoir legally adopted Le Bon as her daughter, but both Le Bon and Beauvoir adamantly state this was not to cement a mother-daughter dynamic. It was rather to assign a legal heir for her unpublished writing. Beauvoir was the one to propose the idea of an adoption and Le Bon was initially reluctant due to fears of scandal and gossip. The advantage to this legal action was that Le Bon became the director of Beauvoir’s posthumous publications. Beauvoir told Le Bon the adoption is “like marriage, because you share my name.” Some scholars interpret this act of adoption as a form of resistance against the heteronormative family unit.

Beauvoir dedicated the last installment of her memoirs All Said and Done to Le Bon. In this book, Beauvoir describes how she encountered Le Bon and how they formed their relationship. Beauvoir noted how nervous Le Bon was in their initial meeting, when Le Bon was still in school. As they had more discussions on literature over time, Beauvoir appreciated that Le Bon was one of the few who understood the meaning of the epilogue Beauvoir wrote in Force of Circumstance. She also records Le Bon’s lesbian coming-of-age experiences, such as Le Bon’s mother shaming her for having a crush on a friend. Beauvoir felt that she had found a true listener in Le Bon and believed they were similar as people: “There is no one who could have appreciated more than I what I have received from her. I loved her enthusiasms and her anger, her gravity, her gaiety, her horror of the commonplace, her uncalculating generosity.” Le Bon was thoroughly integrated into the social circles of Beauvoir and they often saw each other on a daily basis.

After Beauvoir’s death in 1986, Le Bon took over the publication of her work materials and became a spokesperson for Beauvoir. Le Bon participated in a 1994 interview to elucidate Beauvoir’s stances, such as her opinions on Sigmund Freud, Jacques Lacan, and Michel Foucault. Le Bon herself does not have favorable views on Foucault, calling his ideas overrated, old-fashioned, and pseudo-scientific. Le Bon has an established dislike towards Foucault: she has also called him an "archaeological positivist” whose “arbitrary manipulation of constituted knowledges is illegitimate.”

In a 2021 interview, Le Bon described their relationship as friends of equal footing and one of love. Beauvoir described the atypical relationship: “What made it complicated is that neither one of us was prepared, especially me, to love someone who was a woman. But that’s what it was, love, that’s all." Beauvoir did not leave room for interpretation in terms of how serious the relationship was: “from the beginning…we were both prepared to live entirely for each other.” Le Bon even compared their relationship to Beauvoir’s strongest sapphic connection, her childhood friend Zaza. She claims her relationship with Beauvoir was as intense as Beauvoir’s was with Zaza and that their relationship fulfilled Beauvoir’s lifelong search for an intimacy similar to Zaza’s. Beauvoir mirrors this sentiment, as she told a biographer her feelings toward Le Bon are like hers towards Zaza and that she “kept [her] nostalgia for that [her] whole life."

== Contributions to Beauvoir’s Posthumous Legacy ==
Most of Le Bon’s contributions to Beauvoir as a public figure is through the posthumous publication of Beauvoir’s texts. Le Bon took her role as literary executor for Beauvoir to be a mandate to publish these texts.

- Le Bon chose the title for Beauvoir’s posthumously published book The Inseparables, as the original manuscript had no title; also wrote introduction
  - Soon after Le Bon publicized the manuscript in France in 2020, two English translations came out concurrently, since Ecco had the North American rights and Vintage Classics had the rights in the UK.
  - Le Bon says this is Beauvoir’s fourth time writing the story of her intense friendship and love for Zaza, attempts that came from Beauvoir trying to “bring Zaza back to life, in vain.” Le Bon interpreted Beauvoir and Zaza as “one of those great, enigmatic friendships,” but others such as Paul B. Preciado disagreed–“No, this wasn’t friendship. This was a lesbian love story.”
- Republished Beauvoir’s first novel When Things of the Spirit Come First
- Published volumes of Beauvoir’s letters: Unlike Sartre’s adopted daughter Arlette Elkaïm, Le Bon chose to publish Beauvoir’s letters unedited. Letter writing forms an especially valuable part of Beauvoir’s legacy as one of Beauvoir’s distinct characteristics as an author was that her readers felt that she was approachable enough to directly contact her, some even confessing secrets in their letters, and she would often write back. Beauvoir was known to value this correspondence, seeing her readers as the anchor to her work, her literature as a dialogue rather than a closed form expository exercise. Le Bon helped archive Beauvoir’s letters in the Bibliothèque Nationale. Though Beauvoir gave vague answers when questioned about these letters, Le Bon revealed that Beauvoir did catalogue her letters chronologically, suggesting Beauvoir had some interest in the storage and ease of access for these writings.
  - Lettres à Sartre (an anthology of the letters between Simone de Beauvoir and Sartre)
    - In a 1994 interview, Le Bon said she decided to publish these letters with Sartre because Beauvoir had told a Canadian interviewer that her letters could be published if found. Le Bon expressed no indecisiveness on her part for whether these letters should be published as she felt she was close enough to Beauvoir to not regret the posthumous decision. Le Bon recognizes that Beauvoir did not expect her private letters to be published and would not have published them herself, but she believes that the posthumous nature changes the context of publication that Beauvoir was entertaining, and that the publication of these personal writings would help the public get a better glimpse into how the author’s personal life influenced her literature (“le passage du vécu à la littérature”).
    - Le Bon was not only interested in publishing these private writings for the sake of Beauvoir’s public readership; she also chose to publish these anthologies for scholarly purposes. Without these letters and diaries in tandem with the body of work Beauvoir published in her lifetime, Le Bon pointed out Beauvoir scholars would not have the opportunity to trace her thoughts in chronology with her literary work.
    - Le Bon asserts that Beauvoir had implied for her to posthumously publish these writings. With regards specifically to Lettres à Sartre, Le Bon takes Beauvoir’s publication of Sartre’s letters in 1983 as a sign of permission to publish Beauvoir’s letters to Sartre.
    - Le Bon largely attributes the time gaps in the correspondence to be due to the chaos of war, but other scholars have noticed some of the gaps correspond with when some of Sartre’s relationships ended. For later gaps beyond the years of war, however, Le Bon reasons that either the letters were lost or Sartre could not be written to due to circumstances such as being taken prisoner.
  - Lettres à Nelson Algren (Beauvoir’s American lover)
    - Le Bon translated these letters that were originally written in English to French. Le Bon’s choice to translate the American letters to French was not celebrated by all: some pointed out the Chicago slang in the correspondence did not translate well to a French linguistic context.
    - This collection of letters was published, because Le Bon felt that there were already leaks of these letters to the public, and the publication of an “authentic” version was necessary to disprove the inaccurate representations. Her motivation for this publication is another example of Le Bon’s commitment to Beauvoir’s desire to be understood correctly and in the way Beauvoir intended. Nelson Algren, on the other hand, would likely have disapproved of this publication as he did not enjoy Beauvoir discussing their relationship in Force of Circumstance. These letters came as a surprise to the public’s image of Beauvoir, since these writings revealed a new side to Beauvoir: towards Algren–more so than she ever was towards Sartre–Beauvoir was tender, sensitive, and passionate.
  - Correspondance croisée (Simone de Beauvoir and Jacques-Laurent Bost)
- Published Beauvoir’s diaries:
  - Helped edit and publish Beauvoir’s diary entries in the 2006 book Diary of a Philosophy Student with Margaret A. Simons; wrote the foreword
    - In the foreword, Le Bon makes the argument that, in publishing Beauvoir’s diary entries from when she was 18-20 years old, she hopes readers can see for themselves Beauvoir’s coherent philosophies before any influence of Sartre. As such, Le Bon is a defender of Beauvoir’s originality and distinguishes Beauvoir’s legacy from Sartre’s canon. She is interested in carving out the figure of “Beauvoir before Sartre.” She also clarifies Beauvoir and Sartre found kindred spirits within each other when it came to their intellectual property, instead of one’s stronger ideas influencing the other, a dynamic other scholars such as Kate Kirkpatrick would agree with. Le Bon’s statement in this 2006 book is a continuation of a history of Le Bon’s repeated attempts to prevent others from viewing Beauvoir as a student of Sartre and to legitimize Beauvoir in intellectual history.
    - Le Bon describes Beauvoir as “a writer and philosopher, as a woman and feminist.” Beauvoir insisted on being identified as a writer, more so than a philosopher, and she repeatedly clarified this position throughout her lifetime, in hopes that the public’s and her view of herself would be reconciled. Le Bon’s close relationship with Beauvoir is exemplified by her understanding of Beauvoir’s desire to not be misinterpreted, as Le Bon praises the publication of these diaries for “energetically” affirming “her vocation as a writer.” This is a longstanding affirmation of Beauvoir as a writer before a philosopher from Le Bon, as she also stressed in a 1994 interview that “she did not agree…that Beauvoir had been responsible for the main philosophical ideas of L'Etre et le néant), nor would Beauvoir have accepted this.”
    - Le Bon’s attitude of deep admiration towards Beauvoir is apparent in this foreword. Le Bon calls Beauvoir’s intellectual process in these diaries “the birth…of the fundamental choices of thought and existence that would have such an impact on so many future readers, women and men.”
  - Decided to publish Wartime Diary (Journal de guerre) - Beauvoir’s 1939-1941 journal entries
    - Beauvoir has said in an interview that she would dispose of all her diaries and that it would take a significant amount of editing for her to publish them, but Le Bon maintains that Beauvoir never spoke of this sentiment to her. Le Bon believes these contradicting musings were because Beauvoir may have had mixed feelings towards the publication of her diary, rather than any outright denouncement of it. Additionally, this specific diary Beauvoir had intended to publicize but never got around to, supporting the possibility that Beauvoir was more ambivalent than resistant about publishing her private thoughts.
