= Pyrrhus and Cineas =

1944 essay by Simone de Beauvoir

Pyrrhus and Cineas (original title: Pyrrhus et Cinéas) is Simone de Beauvoir's first philosophical essay. It was published in 1944, and in it, she makes a philosophical inquiry into the human situation by way of analogy from the story of when the king Pyrrhus was asked by his friend Cineas what his plans were after conquering his next empire. Cineas's question is a sort of infinite regress ("and then what?") that only stops when Pyrrhus admits that after the last conquest, he will rest. Upon receiving this answer, Cineas asks why Pyrrhus does not rest now instead of going through all the trouble of conquering these other empires when the final result will be rest anyway.

== Content ==
The essay develops the Pyrrhus and Cineas story through a series of examples about action, limits and responsibility. Beauvoir compares Cineas's question to a schoolboy who refuses to begin with the letter "A" because it will lead to the rest of the alphabet and school examinations, and employment. Reflection, then, can make any beginning futile, because any project can be followed by more projects and the question of what comes next. Beauvoir argues that human beings must still choose to act and define their own projects.

According to Beauvoir, Cineas's question haunts all of people's projects, and they will always have to give an answer to it. The authentic answer, as she sees it, goes contrary to traditional interpretations in which Cineas is considered the wiser of the two. Pyrrhus's attitude is considered more authentic in that it is an attitude that directs itself forwards towards goals that are never absolute: According to Beauvoir, the reason for Pyrrhus's final statement that in the end, he is going to rest, is that he lacks imagination.

The essay also introduces several themes that Beauvoir would later develop more fully in The Ethics of Ambiguity. The essay was written in 1943 and published in 1944, with a similar motivation and context. Pyrrhus and Cineas treats human beings as projects rather than fixed objects, and argues that action receives meaning from the ends that people choose for themselves. Cineas's question exposes the apparent absurdity of all projects, because any goal can be questioned by asking what comes after it. Beauvoir's answer is not that projects need a final end, but that human existence is made through choosing, acting, and surpassing given conditions. A goal has a meaning as the end of an effort, but once it is reached, it becomes a new starting point. The essay therefore rejects the idea that goals possess value independent of their projects.

Beauvoir also rejects the idea that a person's sphere of action is determined. In response to the phrase from Candide that one should "cultivate one's garden," she replies that no dimension can be assigned to that garden beforehand. Therefore, the limits of concern are chosen through action. The essay connects this point to the question of one's neighbor. No person is automatically one's neighbor through nature or convention, but rather one makes oneself the neighbor of another through actions undertook. The essay further asks whether one can act for another person. Beauvoir criticizes forms of devotion that appear altruistic but allow the devoted person to avoid their own freedom. Beauvoir treats devotion as ethically ambiguous because it can turn the other person into a source of the agent's own justification. Acting for another can also become paternalistic when the agent confuses their own judgment with the will of the other person. For Beauvoir, one can respond to another person's appeal, but one cannot simply impose a good on another in the name of care or devotion.

Pyrrhus and Cineas can also be read as an early statement of Beauvoir's account of the interdependence of concrete freedoms. Freedom is not isolated nor purely individual. A person's project take shape in relation to other people, and the freedom of others provides the condition through which one's own acts can be recognized, continued, or surpassed.
