= Roger Senhouse =

English publisher and translator (1899–1970)

- Born: 1899
- Died: 1970
- Occupations: Translator, publisher
- Partner: Lytton Strachey

Roger Henry Pocklington Senhouse (18 November 1899 – 31 August 1970) was an English publisher and translator, and a peripheral member of the Bloomsbury Group of writers, intellectuals, and artists. He had a sado-masochistic sexual relationship with Bloomsbury Group member Lytton Strachey.

== Early life and education ==
Roger Henry Pocklington Senhouse was the fourth and youngest son (there being also two daughters) of Humphrey Pocklington-Senhouse, JP, of Netherhall, Maryport, Cumberland (now Cumbria), and Ashby St Ledgers, near Rugby, Warwickshire, Colonel of the Westmorland and Cumberland Yeomanry Cavalry, and his wife Florence Catherine (died 1920), daughter of Turner A. Macan, of Carriff, County Armagh, of a gentry family of Drumcashel. The Pocklington-Senhouse- originally Senhouse- family were landed gentry; Roger's grandmother, Elizabeth Senhouse, was the heir of the Senhouse family, her only brother having died unmarried. She married Joseph Pocklington, JP, of Barrow House- from a Nottinghamshire family recorded back to the reign of Henry VIII- who assumed his wife's surname.

Senhouse attended both Eton College and Oxford University, where he was friends with Michael Llewelyn Davies, one of the boys upon whom Peter Pan was based. J. M. Barrie, the author of Peter Pan became legal guardian of the Llewellyn Davies boys on the death of their parents. Robert Boothby, who was a friend of Senhouse and Davies during that period and himself bisexual said in a 1976 interview that the relationship between Senhouse and Davies was "fleetingly" homosexual in nature.

== Career ==
In 1935, Senhouse became co-owner with Fredric Warburg of the publishing house which became Secker & Warburg, rescuing it from receivership. Senhouse translated several works by French novelist Colette, and collaborated on a translation of The Blood of Others by Simone de Beauvoir - these were published by Secker, along with major works of the era including George Orwell's Nineteen Eighty-Four and Animal Farm, and works by Theodore Roethke, Alberto Moravia, Günter Grass, Angus Wilson, Julian Gloag, and Melvyn Bragg.

== Personal life ==
The private letters of writer and Bloomsbury Group member Lytton Strachey reveal that Senhouse was his (last) lover, and with whom in the late ‘20s and early 1930s he had a sado-masochistic sexual relationship.

== See also ==
- List of Bloomsbury Group people
