= America Day by Day =

1948 book by Simone de Beauvoir

- Author: Simone de Beauvoir
- Publication date: 1948

America Day by Day is a 1948 book by Simone de Beauvoir chronicling her trip by road across the United States of America over four months in 1947. It included visits to New York, Poughkeepsie, Rochester, Niagara Falls, Buffalo, Boston, Washington, D.C., Chicago, Virginia, L.A., San Francisco, New Mexico, Texas, Georgia, Florida and New Orleans. The text takes the form of diary entries, focusing on Beauvoir's daily observations on American life and society.

The book was published in French in 1948. It grew from the essay "An Existentialist Looks at Americans", published in The New York Times Magazine in 1947. The first English translation of the book came out in Britain in 1952. An American version entered the market in 1953, but the primary sections of the text that discussed racial segregation were excluded. Finally, in 1996 another translation was published by the University of California Press. It was done by Carol Cosman with a foreword by Douglas Brinkley.

America Day by Day includes Beauvoir's sociological observations of Americans and American life. In particular, she documents the racial dynamics that she observed, citing the work of Dr. Gunnar Myrdal in his study, An American Dilemma. Beauvoir frames the attitude of white American's toward Black people in terms of bad faith, highlighting the contradiction between the treatment of Black people and the importance of the belief in "the essential dignity of human beings, the basic equality of all men" to white Americans.

While it is not one of Beauvoir's most widely studied texts, scholarship on America Day by Day has explored Beauvoir's experience of her own whiteness and puts the text in conversation with Critical Whiteness Studies. Scholars have also read the text through a postcolonial lens to investigate how Beauvoir engages with the settler colonialist history of the United States.

== Content ==
The text presents a form of knowledge and understanding that is based on subjective experience, which Beauvoir clarifies in her preface: “In place of a serious study, which would be presumptuous for me to attempt, I can offer a faithful account [of my travels]. Because concrete experience involves both subject and object, I have not tried to eliminate myself from this narrative: it is truthful only because it includes the unique personal circumstances in which each discovery was made. That is why I have adopted the journal form...I have respected the chronological order of my amazement, my admiration, my indignation, my hesitations, and my mistakes. Frequently, my first impressions become clearer only as time goes by. For the topics that seem important to me, I have noted how one passage is related to another. But I insist that no isolated piece represents a definitive judgment.”(pgs. xvii-xviii)

Beauvoir's interest in “concrete experience” hints at the philosophical underpinnings of the text and her exploration of an epistemology based in the everyday. Traces of this approach can be seen in The Second Sex and the way that it blends lived experience with objective data. Beauvoir's philosophical ideology can also be found in her descriptions of her arrival in the states and initial time in New York. The disconnect that Beauvoir describes and the confrontation with a world that appears absolute shares similarities with the assessment Beauvoir gives of childhood knowledge in The Ethics of Ambiguity. The child sees the world as absolute and subsequently engages in a non-participatory knowledge of the world. Beauvoir thus presents herself as being in a childish state of understanding this new world she finds herself in.

In America Day by Day one can also see the development of Beauvoir's understanding of oppression, which will continue into her work on The Second Sex. During her trip Beauvoir stayed with Richard Wright, an author who wrote both novels and non-fiction works that explored the experiences of Black people in the US. His ideas and conversation were an important part of Beauvoir's developing understanding of race and segregation in America. Wright had been a friend of Beauvoir long before her trip to the United States: multiple works of his appeared in Les Temps Modernes and he even helped Beauvoir and Jean-Paul Sartre select works for the special 1946 issue on the United States. The book itself is dedicated to both Richard and Ellen Wright who acted as guides for Beauvoir.

Nelson Algren was another guide in Beauvoir's journey, specifically during her time in Chicago. Algren encouraged Beauvoir to engage in slum tourism as a part of being a socially committed writer. This model of entering into another community's space is repeated throughout Beauvoir's travels. It can be seen in her description of first visiting Harlem: “I walk on the big ravenous and in the small side streets; when I'm tired, I sit in the squares. The truth is, nothing can happen to me. And if I don't feel entirely secure, it's because of that fear in the hearts of people who are the same color as I am.” (pg. 36)

Beauvoir becomes almost hyperaware of her race as she moves into a space not meant for her. However she distances herself from the fear that she feels while transgressing racial boundaries and instead she locates the source of her fear in white people. This follows with Beauvoir's later analysis of racism, which pulls substantially from Gunnar Myrdal's study. Myrdal concluded that the history of slavery in America and the presence of racism in the country was in conflict with American ideals of “equality for all.” Beauvoir's own discussion of racism further explores this paradox in ideology for white Americans: “This is a white problem in an even more obvious sense, for it makes itself felt in the heart of every American, where interracial conflict is most intense and where the decisive battle is fought. Many white people feel a sense of danger when they touch on this question, and many have a vague feeling of individual or collective guilt; it creates discomfort in everyone. And the American is not cynical; he hates having a bad conscience. Hence, the great ‘American dilemma’” (pg. 237)

Despite Beauvoir's thorough analysis of race in the United States, America Day by Day largely stays away from the legacy of colonialism in the country. In fact, the mode of transgression into other communities has been critiqued in the context of Beauvoir's visit to the West and her engagement with indigenous communities. Beauvoir goes to reservations and sacred spaces in indigenous communities despite expressed desires by the members of these communities for her to not trespass. This feeds into the text's broader lack of engagement with the settler colonial context of the United States and Beauvoir's identity not only as a white woman in these spaces but also as a colonial presence.

== Reception ==
The British translation of America Day by Day had poor sales, and the initial American reception was primarily based on excerpts that had been published in Les Temps Modernes. Mary McCarthy’s critique of America Day by Day, “Mlle. Gulliver en Amérique,” first came out in The Reporter on January 22, 1952, before the full American translation. The review has been widely cited in Beauvoir scholarship, and primarily takes issue with the way that Beauvoir supposedly “trivializes” the American social landscape. Some scholars have suggested that McCarthy's article showed discomfort with the way that Beauvoir turned an ethnographic gaze unto American society, which was more accustomed to turning its gaze outward as opposed to being gazed upon. Much like the subsequent 1953 translation, McCarthy's review largely ignored Beauvoir's discussion of race. Another review of America Day by Day appeared in the Journal of Negro History. It was written by Mercer Cook, whose view was generally positive and stated that: “Few contemporary studies offer Americans a better opportunity to see ourselves as others see us.” Cook, who was fluent in French, pointed out the 1953 translation's exclusion of Beauvoir's comments on segregation. These omissions, which included 15 instances of Beauvoir's observations on race-relations and her experiences in predominantly Black spaces, are a part of a larger depoliticization of the text through the translation. Comments on labor relations, Truman's foreign policy, and red-baiting had also been excluded from the translation.

== Genre ==
This depoliticization of the text has been partially attributed to the text's identification as a travel narrative. America Day by Day can be read in a tradition of French writers’ and philosophers’ commentaries on America. Tocqueville, Sartre, Le Corbusier, Fernand Léger, and George Duhamel are just some of the writers within this group, many of whom Beauvoir was familiar with. In fact, America Day by Day makes explicit reference to Duhamel's account of the country, countering his negative view of American materialism: “Not a single car on this narrow, winding road. It gets increasingly primitive, and N. and I say to each other that Georges Duhamel must have had very little firsthand experience of America to have claimed that the countryside was hidden by advertising billboards.” (pg. 129)

America Day by Day also follows from a tradition of texts from women travel writers in the nineteenth century. Specifically the social exploration that Beauvoir ventures on in her travels shares similarities with the works of Maria Callcott Graham and Flora Tristan, who were writing critiques of the social conditions in French and British colonies.
