= The Ethics of Ambiguity =

1947 book by Simone de Beauvoir

First English-language edition published by Philosophical Library in 1948. This version is translated by Bernard Frechtman.

The Ethics of Ambiguity (French: Pour une morale de l'ambiguïté) is Simone de Beauvoir's second major non-fiction work and a philosophical work of existentialist ethics. It was prompted by a lecture she gave in 1945, where she claimed that it was impossible to base an ethical system on her partner Jean-Paul Sartre's major philosophical work Being and Nothingness (French: L'Être et le néant). The following year, over a six-month period, she took on the challenge, publishing the resulting text first as three installments in Les Temps modernes, (Sartre's Journal, which she also co-founded) in November 1947, as a book.The Ethics of Ambiguity follows the phenomenological tradition.

== Context ==
The Ethics of Ambiguity was written shortly after World War II, being published in 1947. Beauvoir's ethics respond to the moral crisis produced by World War II, and living in Nazi occupied Paris and concern with evil, oppression, and moral necessity of taking a position. The context of the war made the problem of evil inseparable from the problem of freedom. Thus, the work was intended for a literate but non-academic audience, which is evident stylistically, and develops Beauvoir's existentialist account of freedom, responsibility, and relation to others.

This work is one of Beauvoir's central contributions to existentialist ethics. It attempts to answer whether an ethical system is possible within existentialism, given its emphasis on individual freedom, ambiguity and the absence of predetermined values.

The book responds to the existentialist problems raised in Being and Nothingness and existentialist ethics generally. Being and Nothingness describes human beings as being radically free. Yet, this conflicts with the notion of freedom as an ethical goal if humans are already free. Beauvoir addresses this contradiction by distinguishing between basic human freedom and ethical, or moral freedom. She argues that freedom cannot be separated from responsibility to others. Although humans exist in the absence of absolute moral guarantees, this cannot lead to moral permissiveness. Instead, ethical action must proceed from the ambiguous condition of human existence, where responsibility is placed onto individuals who must act within ambiguity while remaining accountable for their choice and actions.

The Ethics of Ambiguity criticizes institutions that provide fixed answers, whether religious, political, or historical institutions. Ethics then is open ended, situated, and reciprocal. Beauvoir also examines reciprocity and examples of bad faith including submission to authority, attachment to fixed values, and denial or misuse of freedom. In developing this account, Beauvoir also refutes the idea of freedom as purely internal. Instead, freedom can be alienated through situation. Ethical freedom therefore requires more than recognizing oneself as free, but requires acting in ways that preserved the shared condition of freedom.

== Contents ==
The Ethics of Ambiguity consists of three parts and a short conclusion, totaling 192 pages for the English version. The English version was translated in 1948 by Bernard Frechtman.

=== Part I ===
"Ambiguity and Freedom," lays out the philosophical underpinnings of Beauvoir's stance on ethics. She asserts that a person is fundamentally free to make choices, a freedom that comes from one's own "nothingness," which is an essential aspect of one's ability to be self-aware, to be conscious of oneself: "... the nothingness which is at the heart of man is also the consciousness that he has of himself." But each person is also a thing, a "facticity," an object for others. The ambiguity is that each of us is both subject and object, freedom and facticity. As free, we have the ability to take note of ourselves and choose what to do. As factic, we are constrained by physical limits, social barriers and the expectations and political power of others.

Beauvoir begins Part I by stating that human existence is marked by a "tragic ambiguity" that philosophy has often tried to resolve or conceal. Some philosophies reduce the human existence to matter, while others place the body and soul in a hierarchy. Beauvoir presents existentialism as a philosophy that assumes ambiguity rather than resolving it. Ethics then becomes possible because human beings are incomplete, finite, and capable of failure.

Beauvoir rejects any notion of an absolute goodness or moral imperative that exists on its own. "...there exists no absolute value before the passion of man, outside of it, in relation to which one might distinguish the useless from the useful." Values come only from our choices.

Beauvoir responds to the claim that, if God does not exist, everything is permitted. She argues that God's absence does not authorize license, but instead makes human responsibility more complete. Without divine pardon or external justification, human beings are more accountable for the values they create and the consequences of their actions. Therefore, existentialism does not eliminate ethics.

Human freedom can be only in concrete projects, particular circumstances, not in the abstract. Freedom "requires the realization of concrete ends, of particular projects."

Part I also introduces the distinction between ontological and ethical freedom. "To will oneself free" is to transform ontological freedom into moral freedom through action or commitment, and is a continuous process.

The types of particular content that are suitable are discussed in Part III.

=== Part II ===
Part II, "Personal Freedom and Others," examines a number of different ways that people try to deny their freedom, as freedom can be uncomfortable and disquieting. The freedom to choose entails the freedom to try to avoid one's freedom. Before we can even do that, however, we start as children, who take the values of the adults around them as ready-made things. She calls this the attitude of "seriousness," in which the child "escapes the anguish of freedom" by thinking of values as existing objectively, outside themselves, rather than as an expression of their freedom. Once past childhood, one can be a sub-man who avoids all questions of freedom and assumes themselves not free. The sub-man is characterized by apathy, fear, and avoidance. He does not positively assume projects. The sub-man might be prone to attaching himself to labels or movements without assuming responsibility for their meaning. The next rung up the hierarchy is the serious man who "gets rid of his freedom by claiming to subordinate it to values which would be unconditioned," in effect reverting to a kind of childhood. The serious man subordinates himself to values treated as absolute. Seriousness is not defined by the particular object pursued, but by the denial of freedom in favor of that object. This attitude can justify non-ethical actions due to the pursuit of an absolute, unquestionable end. Both the sub-man and the serious man refuse to recognize that they are free, in the sense of being able to choose their own values.

Beauvoir describes childhood as a stage where the world appears already made. The child encounters language, customs, values, reward, and punishment as external facts. She calls this the "serious world," where obedience to adult authority appears natural. Adolescence marks the point at which the world begins to lose its absoluteness, and the individual becomes aware of the ambiguity and subjectivity, and begins to choose.

Beauvoir distinguishes between childhood as an imposed condition and adult forms of dependence on authority The child is not held responsible for accepting the ready made values, because this relation is characteristic of childhood. Adults who are enslaved, mystified, and denied means of action may also encounter the world in a similar, fixed way. However, outside of these circumstances, accepting ready made values becomes a refusal of freedom.

Several other types recognize their freedom, but misuse it. The nihilist, having failed at life, decides not to try anything at all. "Conscious of being unable to be anything, man then decides to be nothing. ... Nihilism is disappointed seriousness which has turned back upon itself." The nihilist appears after the collapse of the serious world. He recognizes that inherited values are not absolute, but responds by rejecting value itself, without establishing a positive project of freedom. The adventurer is one who engages vigorously in various life projects, but without caring for the goal. The adventurer "does not attach himself to the end at which he aims; only to his conquest. He likes action for its own sake." And they trample on others in the process: "[T]he adventurer shares the nihilist’s contempt for men." The adventurer might resemble a free person in some respects. However, he pursues action without regard for the freedom of others. Finally the passionate man cares enthusiastically about his goal, but shares a similar contempt for others: "Not intending his freedom for men, the passionate man does not recognize them as freedoms either. He will not hesitate to treat them as things." The passionate man becomes problematic when he subordinates other people to the desired object.

And finally there is genuine freedom, which takes the excitement of the adventurer and the passion of the passionate man and includes with them a concern for other people, other freedoms, as well. "Passion is converted to genuine freedom only if one destines his existence to other existences." "To will oneself free is also to will others free."

=== Part III ===
Part III, "The Positive Aspect of Ambiguity," examines the intricacies and nuances of genuinely free action in the world. It includes five sections.

Part III, Section 1, "The Aesthetic Attitude," criticizes the attitude of detached contemplation as being unworkable. Beauvoir describes the aesthetic attitude as a form of detached contemplation that treats historical events and human suffering as objects to be observed rather than situations of choice. She accepts that such detachment may be possible in the relation to the past, where action can no longer change events, but rejects it in relation to the present. Attempts to stand outside contemporary political or moral situations is a form of participation, because refusing to act itself is a position.

Part III, Section 2, "Freedom and Liberation," explores the evils of oppression and offers a number of trenchant observations about the relationship between the oppressor and the oppressed. The oppressor recognizes the interdependence of people, but treats those of the oppressed class as things, not as free human existents in their own right. To prevent them from rebelling, the oppressor tries to mystify them into thinking that the oppressive situation is just natural. But it is not, and "the oppressed can fulfill his freedom as a man only in revolt ...."
In "Freedom and Liberation," Beauvoir argues that the demand to will freedom is not an empty formula, because freedom is realize only through concrete action. She distinguishes material obstacles from oppression; natural limits may restrict projects, but oppression occurs when people prevent another person's transcendence and from reaching their ends. Therefore, oppression is not a natural condition but a human condition. Oppressive systems often present themselves as natural or inevitable, and liberation involves revealing oppression as human made and placing the oppressed person "in the presence of his freedom." Additionally, a freedom that seeks to deny freedom is not freedom and must be opposed.
Part III, Section 3, "The Antinomies of Action," examines the need for violence and its consequent moral quandaries. "In order for a liberating action to be a thoroughly moral action, it would have to be achieved through a conversion of the oppressors: there would then be a reconciliation of all freedoms. But no one any longer dares to abandon himself today to these utopian reveries." Under what circumstances, then, is violence justified? Under what circumstances may the oppressed treat the oppressors as less than fully human in order to secure their own liberation? Beauvoir considers in some detail the nuances and difficulties of such considerations.
In "The Antinomies of Action" Beauvoir examines the contradictions involved in political action and liberation. She argues that liberating action may require opposing or suppressing those who deny freedom, which creates an ethical difficulty because use it requires treating other people as objects or obstacles. Violence therefore is ambiguous in its use. It may be necessary in struggles against oppression, but it also is not morally neutral. Beauvoir also criticizes attempts to justify violence by appealing to utility, or the success of a cause. Because human beings are both a means and an ends, political action cannot reduce individuals to means. The problem of action, then, is one where there is a choice between competing freedoms.

Part III, Section 4, "The Present and the Future," treats the relationship of action in the present to achieve an uncertain goal in the future. The determinism suggested by the dialectical materialism of Karl Marx is considered and criticized.
In this section, Beauvoir criticizes the political and philosophical appeals to a future that is fixed or absolute. The future cannot justify violence or oppression as though it were a completed thing. For the future has meaning through human projects. She rejects the notion that present suffering can be dismissed. Ethical action must therefore be consistent with present responsibility rather than a future outcome.

Part III, Section 5, "Ambiguity," returns to the originating theme of the work, that each individual is both radically free, able to transcend themself, and factical, constrained by that which just is what it is. How does one remain true to one's freedom while allowing others their own freedom, even if they make mistakes? Are we justified in telling the truth when another person finds the truth unbearable? We have to act in particular situations, "inventing an original solution" each time, but remembering that "man is man only through situations whose particularity is precisely a universal fact."
In the final section, Beauvoir presents ethical action as situated. Moral problems cannot be solved by applying abstract formulas, rather, each situation is particular in its people and consequences. The section uses examples such as whether to tell a difficult truth or how to respond to another person's destructive choices. Beauvoir also emphasize that the Other is multiple," meaning that one person's freedom is inherently connect to the freedom of many others. Ethical judgement therefore requires attention to particular situations.

The brief Conclusion sums up Beauvoir's view of human freedom: "... we are absolutely free today if we choose to will our existence in its finiteness, a finiteness which is open on the infinite." She ends with a call for us to realize and act on this fundamental truth of our existence.

== Themes ==
=== Ambiguity and the human condition ===
Beauvoir's account of human existence is fundamentally ambiguous. Human beings are both free subjects as well as facticity, which limits one's freedom. Many philosophical and moral systems try to overcome ambiguity by presenting fixed truths or fixed moral ends. Beauvoir, and existentialism, postulates that ambiguity cannot be resolved, and then ethics must exist within ambiguity.

=== Ontological and ethical freedom ===
Beauvoir distinguishes between ontological freedom and ethical freedom. Ontological freedom refers to the basic condition of human existence, where human beings are conscious beings with the ability to choose, who are not predetermined by fixed or external values. Ethical freedom, by contrast, concerns how ontological freedom is used. Freedom becomes ethical freedom when it is taken up responsibly and directed toward the preservation of freedom in others as well as oneself.

=== Reciprocity ===
Freedom is not treated as an individual trait, but rather something that is shared. The ethical subject must therefore will freedom for the self and for others. In a social and political sense, Beauvoir refutes exploitation and oppression because they limit freedom.

=== Bad faith ===
Beauvoir investigates the ways in which individuals can avoid the demands of freedom, using examples such as the sub-man, the serious man, the nihilist, the adventurer, and the passionate person. The sub-man avoids responsibility altogether, while the serious man hides behind fixed values and authority. The nihilist rejects value because he cannot find absolute value. Meanwhile, the adventurer and passionate man recognize freedom but misuse it in their pursuits of action, or personal passion.

== Translation ==
The first English edition of the Ethics of Ambiguity was published by Philosophical Library in 1948 and translated from French by Bernard Frechtman. This version is the standard English translation to this day.

Scholar Emily Anne Parker has argued that the English translation obscures Beauvoir's use of singularité in French, or singularity in English. This term is translated inconsistently in the English version, appearing as "individual," "unique," "own," and "particularity." This term refers to the irreducibility of an existing being, rather than a particular instance or individual of a category.

== Sources ==
- Bergoffen, Debra. "Simone de Beauvoir". Stanford Encyclopedia of Philosophy. Retrieved on 1 November 2011.
- De Beauvoir, Simone. The Ethics of Ambiguity. Marxists Internet Archive. Another version, not as well proof-read, is here at Webster University. Retrieved on 2 November 2011.
- Holveck, Eleanore (Autumn 1999). "'The Blood of Others': A Novel Approach to The Ethics of Ambiguity". Hypatia. 14 (4): 3–17. doi:10.1353/hyp.2005.0030. JSTOR 3810823.
- Meacham, Bill. "Simone de Beauvoir: A Philosophy of Liberation". bmeacham.com. Retrieved on 2 November 2011.
- Mussett, Shannon. "Simone de Beauvoir (1908–1986)". Internet Encyclopedia of Philosophy. Retrieved on 2 November 2011.
