= When Things of the Spirit Come First =

Collection of short stories by Simone de Beauvoir

First US edition (publ. Pantheon Books, 1979)

When Things of the Spirit Come First is Simone de Beauvoir's first work of fiction. It consists of five short stories woven together in a way that is structurally similar to a more traditional novel.

Beauvoir submitted this collection of interlinked stories to a publisher in 1937. But it was turned down by both Gallimard and Grasset. Gallimard eventually published it in 1979. The first English translation came out from Pantheon in 1982.

The first story, "Marcelle", tells the story of the oldest of three siblings. She marries an abusive artist. The second, "Chantal", tells the story of a lycee philosophy teacher. She idealizes her life and becomes involved in the lives of her students but ultimately refuses to help them. "Lisa" is the third and shortest story, about a girl who struggles to live a spiritual life while existing in a physical body. "Anne", the fourth story, is the result of many of de Beauvoir's earlier attempts at writing. It parallels the story of her friend Elizabeth Mabille (Zaza) who died soon after her mother refused to allow her to marry Maurice Merleau-Ponty. The final story, "Marguerite" expresses the existential views that de Beauvoir herself believed that life itself should be experienced and one should "look things straight in the face, without accepting oracles or ready-made values."
