= Simone de Beauvoir =

French philosopher, social theorist and activist (1908–1986)

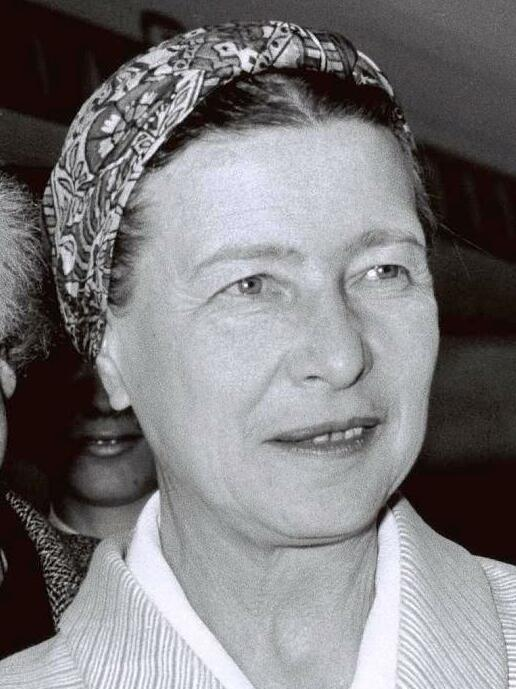
- Beauvoir in 1967
- Born: Simone Lucie Ernestine Marie Bertrand de Beauvoir; 9 January 1908; Paris, France
- Died: 14 April 1986 (aged 78); Paris, France
- Resting place: Montparnasse Cemetery, Paris
- Occupations: Philosopher; writer; social theorist; activist
- Partners: Jean-Paul Sartre (1929–1980; his death); Nelson Algren (1947–1964); Claude Lanzmann (1952–1959)

Education
- Education: University of Paris (BA, MA); ENS (audit student)
- Academic advisor: Léon Brunschvicg

Philosophical work
- Notable works: The Second Sex (1949)

Philosophical work
- Era: 20th-century philosophy
- Region: Western philosophy
- School: Continental philosophy; Existentialism; Existential phenomenology; French feminism; Western Marxism
- Main interests: Political philosophy; existential phenomenology
- Notable ideas: "Ethics of ambiguity"; Feminist ethics; Existential feminism

Simone Lucie Ernestine Marie Bertrand de Beauvoir (Note: UK: /də ˈboʊvwɑːr/, US: /də boʊˈvwɑːr/; French: [simɔn də bovwaʁ]) (9 January 1908 – 14 April 1986) was a French existentialist philosopher, writer, social theorist, and feminist activist. Though she did not consider herself a philosopher, nor was she considered one at the time of her death, she had a significant influence on both feminist existentialism and feminist theory.

Beauvoir wrote novels, essays, short stories, biographies, autobiographies, and monographs on philosophy, politics, and social issues. She was best known for her "trailblazing work in feminist philosophy", The Second Sex (1949), a detailed analysis of women's oppression and a foundational tract of contemporary feminism. She was also known for her novels, the most famous of which were She Came to Stay (1943) and The Mandarins (1954).

Her most enduring contribution to literature is her memoirs, notably the first volume, Mémoires d'une jeune fille rangée (1958). She received the 1954 Prix Goncourt, the 1975 Jerusalem Prize, and the 1978 Austrian State Prize for European Literature. She was also nominated for the Nobel Prize in Literature in 1961, 1969 and 1973.

== Biography ==
=== Early years ===
Beauvoir was born on 9 January 1908 in Montparnasse in the 6th arrondissement in a quality but poorly furnished apartment. Beauvoir's family was historically bourgeois though her aristocratic ancestor was given the title in 1786 and was killed during the revolution in 1790. Her parents were Georges Bertrand de Beauvoir, initially a lawyer but who aspired to be an actor, and Françoise Beauvoir (née Brasseur), a wealthy banker's daughter and devout Catholic. The family expected a dowry, but after Françoise's father was jailed, the promised dowry was not available.

As her parents were often absent, Simone was primarily raised by her nanny Louise. Louise had a strained relationship with Françoise Beauvoir. Simone also had a sister, Hélène, who was born on 6 June 1910. Beauvoir was intellectually precocious, fueled by her father's encouragement; he reportedly would boast,

"Simone has a man's brain; she thinks like a man; she is a man."

— Françoise Beauvoir (née Brasseur), in Caroline Moorehead, A talk with Simone de Beauvoir, The New York Times

Writing of her youth in Memoirs of a Dutiful Daughter, she said:

...my father's individualism and pagan ethical standards were in complete contrast to the rigidly moral conventionalism of my mother's teaching. This disequilibrium, which made my life a kind of endless disputation, is the main reason why I became an intellectual.

— Simone de Beauvoir, Memoirs of a Dutiful Daughter, Book One, pg. 41

In the onset of World War I and inflation, and her father's turns at the front then the Ministry of War, the family's finances shrank significantly. Her father refused to return to law and likely became physically abusive to Françoise. He then began working for her mother's formerly disgraced father in a shoe factory, but he was an unreliable worker and the factory shuttered after the war. A family member offered him a role in newspaper advertising sales, but he also lost that job. In 1919, the family moved to a small fifth floor apartment with no central heating, running water, or bathroom.

==== Education ====
As a young child, Beauvoir only attended school two days per week, starting at 5, and was otherwise educated by her mother. As a teenager, Beauvoir pursued post-secondary education after completing her high school years at Cours Desir. After passing baccalaureate exams in mathematics and philosophy at the age of seventeen in 1925, she studied mathematics at the Institut Catholique de Paris and literature/languages at the Institut Sainte-Marie.

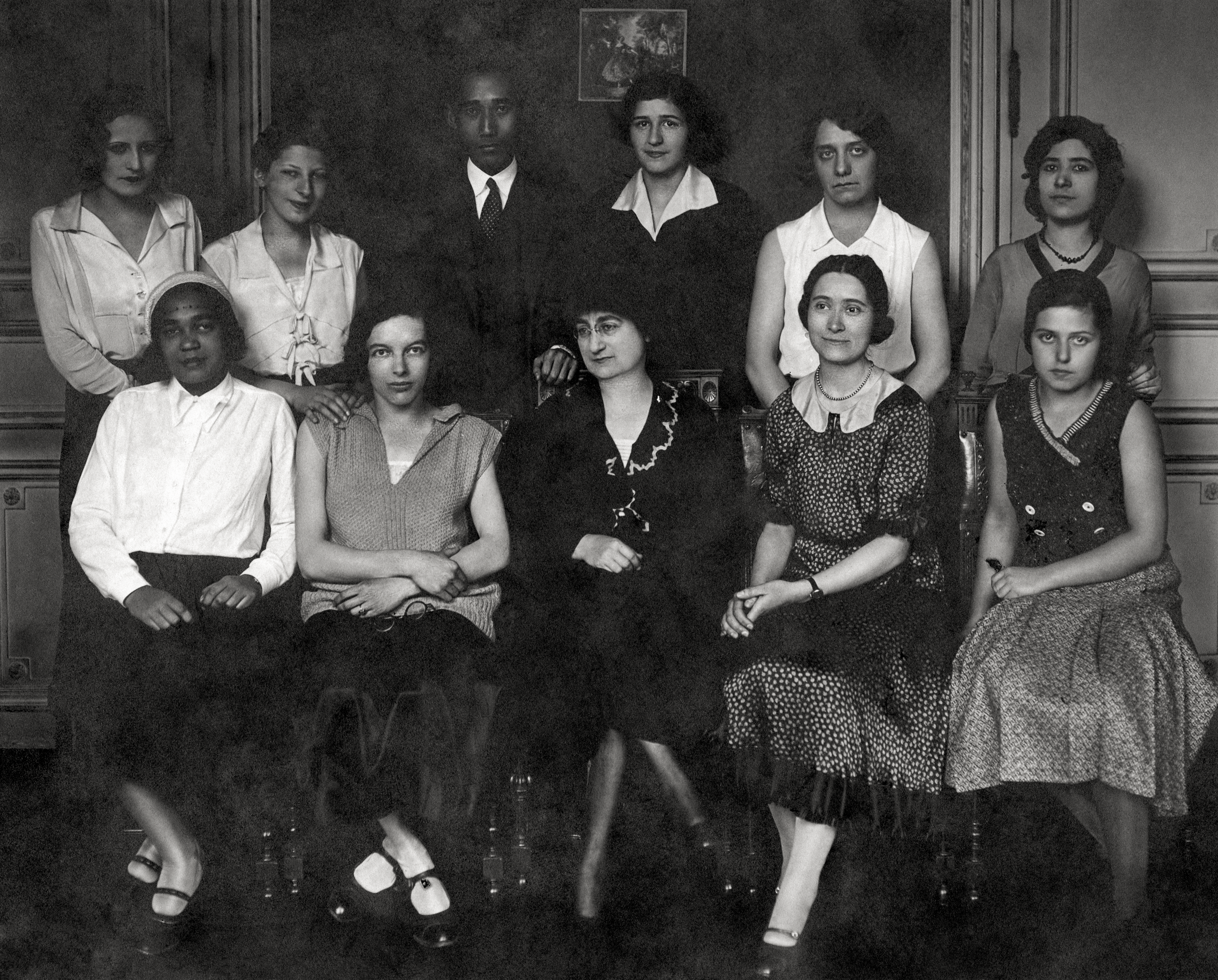
Class at the École Normale in Paris, 1930s.

Although not officially enrolled, she sat in on courses at the École Normale Supérieure in preparation for the agrégation in philosophy, a highly competitive postgraduate examination that serves as a national ranking of students. It was while studying for it that she met École Normale students Jean-Paul Sartre, Paul Nizan, and René Maheu (who gave her the lasting nickname "Castor", or "Beaver"). She studied philosophy at the Sorbonne and after completing her degree in 1928, wrote her Diplôme d'études supérieures spécialisées (roughly equivalent to an M.A. thesis) on Leibniz for Léon Brunschvicg in 1929 (the topic was "Le concept chez Leibniz" ["The Concept in Leibniz"]). In 1929, the jury for the agrégation narrowly awarded Sartre first place and gave second to Beauvoir. She was 21 years old which made her the youngest person to ever pass the exam and the eighth woman ever to do so. Additionally, Beauvoir finished an exam for the certificate of "General Philosophy and Logic" second to Simone Weil and before Maurice Merleau-Ponty. Her success as the eighth woman to pass the agrégation solidified her economic independence.

During this period Beauvoir maintained close friendships with her sister Helene, her friend Zara, and her cousin Jacques, for whom she had romantic interest. Though Jaques was often hot and cold towards her, he did begin a courtship with Beauvoir talking to her about authors, banned books, visiting art galleries, and musical performances. After Jacques failed his exams, he became more distant which Beauvoir assumed was a reflection of her own flaws Eventually, her mother forbade their courtship

==== Religious upbringing ====
Beauvoir was raised Catholic and educated in convent schools. At age 7, she began taking communion three times a week. She was deeply religious and intended to become a nun. At age 14, Beauvoir began to question her faith and would go on to abandon religion in her teens. She remained an atheist for the rest of her life. To explain her atheist beliefs, Beauvoir stated,

"Faith allows an evasion of those difficulties which the atheist confronts honestly. And to crown all, the believer derives a sense of great superiority from this very cowardice itself."

— Simone Bertrand de Beauvoir, All Said and Done

=== Young Adulthood ===
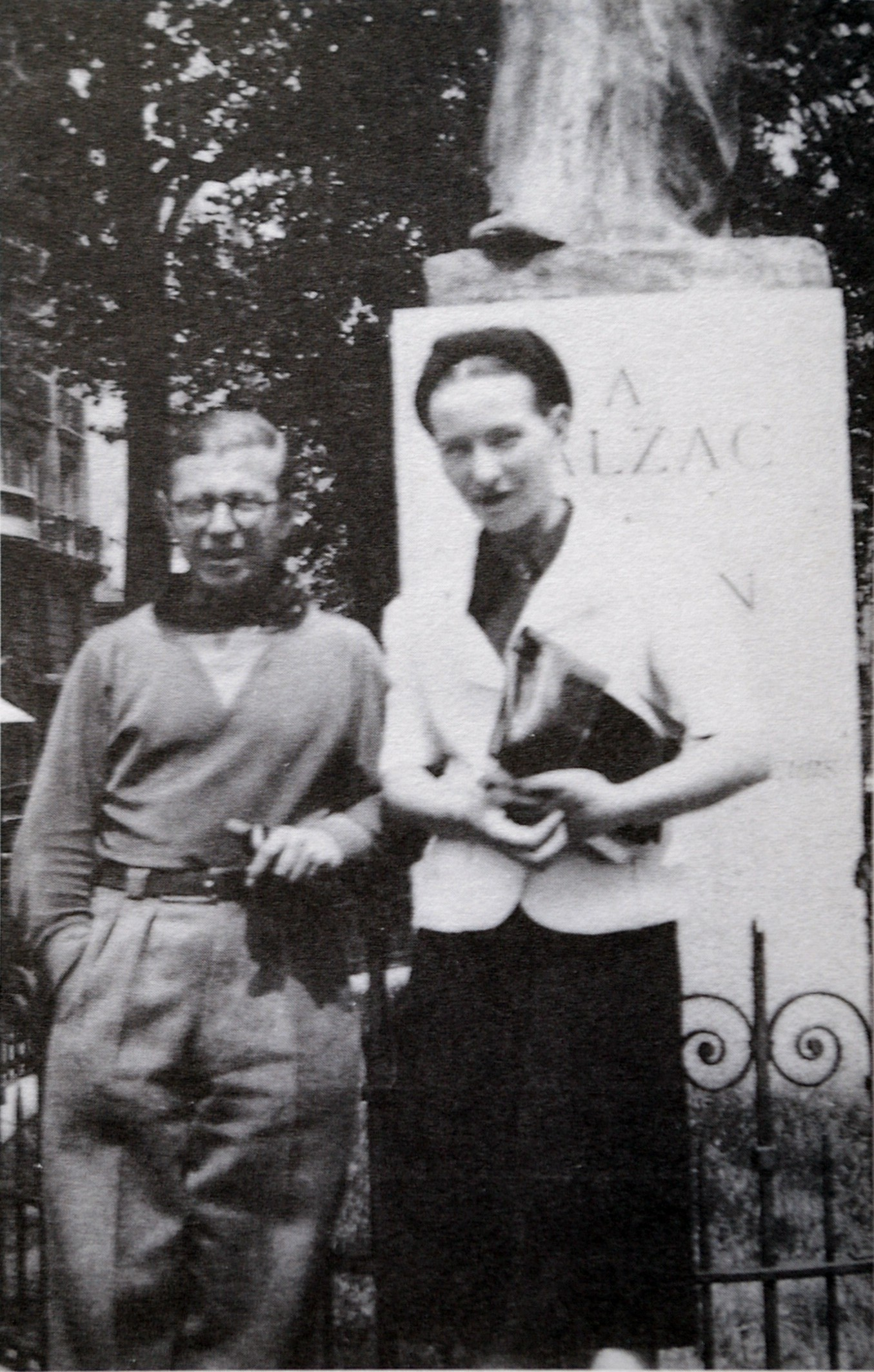
Jean-Paul Sartre and Simone de Beauvoir at the Balzac Memorial

Upon a visit to Lourdes at age eighteen Beauvoir felt disgust at the intellectual and sentimental, and felt her own sorrows could not compare to the suffering of the sick. Though she later updated this thought stating in her diaries that she should not be ashamed of living, and that as she has been given life it is her duty to live in the best possible way, and anything else is moral suicide.

Simone took a volunteer teaching position, in part to escape her mother's control, making up extra volunteer days so she could be allowed to walk Paris or watch her sister's art, and then worked part-time teaching for extra money to spend in Paris. Beauvoir began to expand her friendships, though friends noted she was prudish and often scandalized. She would soon expand her friendship with Merleau-Ponty, and wrote an ethical and love-focused thesis under the direction of Jean Baruzi. It was also at this time that she would become an atheist, stating she could now feel the terrible significant of the word alone. Merleau-Ponty and Zara would court and were kept apart by their parents. When they eventually decided to marry, Zara grew ill and died, with both spiritualizing their suffering, instead of blaming their parents for keeping them apart, which Beavour did not like. Beauvoir would eventually write a novel on Zara and Marleau-Ponty's relationship in Inseparable, published posthumously.

==== Introduction to Jean-Paul Sartre ====
In 1929 Beauvoir became friends and possibly lovers with René Maheau, who was friends with Sartre. Sartre heard of Beauvoir's thesis and sent her a painting of Leibniz bathing with mermaids. Beauvoir initially resisted meeting him, a known womanizer, and sent her sister Helene to meet him instead. Beauvoir and Sartre later met a study group, and Sartre sent her presents including a Japanese painting and porcelain which Beauvoir did not like. Maheau failed to receive one of the twenty-six available teaching posts and left Paris, where Beauvoir became closer to Sartre, through notably conflicted between her feelings between Sartre, Jacques, and Maheu, which she later downplayed in her public diaries.

In October 1929, Jean-Paul Sartre and Beauvoir became a couple for the next 51 years, until his death in 1980. After they were confronted by her father, Sartre asked her to marry him on a provisional basis. One day while they were sitting on a bench outside the Louvre, he said, "Let's sign a two-year lease". Though Beauvoir wrote, "Marriage was impossible. I had no dowry", scholars point out that her ideal relationships described in The Second Sex and elsewhere bore little resemblance to the marriage standards of the day.

I think marriage is a very alienating institution, for men as well as for women. I think it's a very dangerous institution—dangerous for men, who find themselves trapped, saddled with a wife and children to support; dangerous for women, who aren't financially independent and end up by depending on men who can throw them out when they are 40; and very dangerous for children, because their parents vent all their frustrations and mutual hatred on them. The very words 'conjugal rights' are dreadful. Any institution which solders one person to another, obliging people to sleep together who no longer want to is a bad one.

Instead, she and Sartre entered into a lifelong "soul partnership", which was sexual but not exclusive, nor did it involve living together. She chose never to marry and never had children. This gave her the time to advance her education and engage in political causes, write and teach, and take lovers.

=== Teaching Period ===
After the completion of her studies, Beauvoir saw teaching as an opportunity to work towards earning her own living. She worked with Maurice Merleau-Ponty and Claude Lévi-Strauss, when all three completed their practice teaching requirements at the same secondary school. From 1929 through 1943, Beauvoir taught at the lycée level until she could support herself solely on the earnings of her writings. She taught at the Lycée Montgrand (Marseille), the Lycée Jeanne-d'Arc (Rouen), and the Lycée Molière (Paris) (1936–39).

During the trial of Robert Brasillach in 1945, Beauvoir was among a small number of prominent intellectuals advocating for his execution for the 'intellectual crimes' of supporting Fascism and the genocide of Jewish people. She defended this decision in her 1946 essay "An Eye for an Eye".

==== Relationships with former students ====
Beauvoir was bisexual, and her relationships with young women are controversial. Throughout the 1930s and 40s, Beauvoir maintained three relationships with younger women, including Olga Kosakiewicz, Natalie Sorokin, and Bianca Lamblin (originally Bianca Bienenfeld). Beauvoir met Olga when she was nineteen and Beauvoir twenty-seven and eventually, she had relationships with both Beauvoir and Sartre, though according to Beauvoir, Olga would not have sex with Sartre. At this time Beauvoir would also begin what became a ten-year relationship with Jacques-Laurent Bost, which she hid from her memoirs. While the relationship with Olga ended, Olga would remain friends with Beauvoir through the 1970s. Bost would go on to court and marry Olga which made Beauvoir jealous. Beauvoir stated her only sensual life was with Bost, though she hid this from both Olga and Jacques-Laurent. Beauvoir would also continue years of dishonesty lying and hiding her relationship with Bost from Olga.

Beauvoir met Bianca Lamblin when she was sixteen, and after the year ended and she was no longer a pupil Beauvoir travelled to Morvan on a hiking trip with Bianca. She continued the relationship for several years, seeing her several times a week as she studied at the Sorbonne. In 1938, Simone introduced Bianca to Sartre, and she was impressed by him and also began a relationship with him. When Sartre was called to the war, Beauvoir began to criticize the much younger Bianca as increasingly controlling and entitled. Bianca opposed Beauvoir sending money to her sister, and wanted her to end her relationships with others. When Beauvoir went to visit Bianca, whose Jewish family fled Paris, Bianca stated her mother had intercepted a letter between them. Beauvoir began to express regret about her sexual relationship with Bianca, which she said took advantage of her body and that it was boorish.

Beauvoir then taught Natalie Sorokin, the same age as Bianca, and was initially opposed to any sexual relationship. Sorokin told Beauvoir she loved her, and Beauvoir said "if she was free" she would pursue it. Sorokin's mother filed a complaint against Beauvoir in 1941 which resulted in a one and a half yearlong investigation. They could not confirm a relationship but did confirm Beauvoir had suspicious unmarried living arrangements and taught homosexual authors. Her license was reinstated in 1945, but she would not teach again dedicating herself fulltime to writing. Beauvoir framed the incident as Sorokin's mother being angry that she was unable to convince Sorokin to leave a poor man she was interested in. Beauvoir would then go on to work for Radio Vichy, a non-collaborator radio station working on music from the middle ages. She also used this time to write She Came to Stay and the Blood of Others.

Near the same time Beauvoir met Sorokin, Sartre stated he wanted to end his relationship with Bianca, and Beauvoir stated they could not ignore "how used" Bianca was. After Sartre ended his relationship with Bianca, Beauvoir stated they could not ignore how they treated people was unacceptable, and Bianca soon had a mental breakdown. Beauvoir wrote to Sartre stating that it was unacceptable how much they made her suffer and Sartre stated he liked her draft novel "because of its absence of thought". Bianca's family informed Beauvoir that she should flee Paris with Bianca's family, after it became clear the Paris would fall to the Nazis. Beauvoir would instead go to a friend's house near Laval, later returning to Paris. Beauvoir told Bianca they should see each other less, which made Bianca "desperate beyond words" because of her attachment to Beauvoir, and Bianca began a relationship with one of Sartre's students who she would soon marry, making her parents relived she would have a less Jewish name. After the war, Bianca would seek out Beauvoir, complaining of deep unhappiness and Bueavoir writing to Sartre in 1945 that they had caused her deep unhappiness and harmed her, with Bianca's psychologist, Jacques Lacan, agreeing.

Beauvoir promised to never publish details about Lamblin, but Sylvie published letters between Sartre and Beauvoir (Lettres à Sartre and Journal de Guerre) after Beauvoir's death, with Lamblin simply given a pseudonym. In these letters, Bianca would read Sartre and Beauvoir's correspondence about her, published for the first time. Lamblin felt she, Beauvoir, and Sartre would be a permanent love triangle and that before she met Sartre in 1938, she had only been friends with Beauvoir. The relationship would, per Lamblin, become romantic and sexual in 1939. Lamblin believed all parties knew she expected a loving threesome, though Beauvoir's own accounts are mixed. Lamblin states that Beauvoir encouraged Sartre to break up with her, which she only learned about in the published letters and offended her deeply destroying her image of the forty-year friendship they had shared. She, upon learning that she was given a pseudonym, stated she felt "nauseated and disgusted when [she] discovered the true personality of the woman, [she] had loved all [her] life". Lamblin also recounts being hurt when an American biography revealed her pseudonym and true identity, with a translation later published in French. Beauvoir and Lamblin had remained lifelong friends, with Lamblin stated she trusted Beauvoir completely, and considered her innately honest but felt deceived upon the publishing of Journal de guerre. Lamblin wrote in her book Mémoires d'une jeune fille dérangée (Memoirs of a deranged young girl, published in English under the title A Disgraceful Affair) as a response to reading the letters, which caused her to revoke her forgiveness of Beauvoir.

Beauvoir described in La Force de l'âge (The Prime of Life) a relationship of simple friendship with Sorokin (in the book referred to as "Lise Oblanoff"). However, both Sorokin and Lamblin—along with Olga Kosakiewicz—stated later that their relationships with Beauvoir had damaged them psychologically.

=== Life as a Public Intellectual ===
Beauvoir ended her teaching career, and began to live as a writer and public intellectual. From 1941 to 1946 Beauvoir held found the latest paper Les Temps Modernes and wrote some of her most important works, including novels The Blood of Others (1945) and All Men are Mortal (1946) and her first philosophical essay Pyrrhus et Cinéas (1944) followed by The Ethics of Ambiguity (1947). She began publishing parts of The Second Sex in Les Temps Modernes in 1949.

Post-war Beauvoir's work was increasingly famous in France and abroad, and she began travels including to North Africa to lecture and then in 1947 made a long trip to the United States where she met Sartre's lover Dolors Vanetti. While in America she met author Nelson Algren. Beauvoir met Algren in Chicago in 1947, while she was on a four-month "exploration" trip of the United States using various means of transport: automobile, train, and Greyhound. While in the United States, Beauvoir began writing letters on women's issues, giving lectures on a twenty-four lecture tour on ethics and writing, and landed in New York where she also became friends with Ellen and Richard Wright who introduced her to books on race in America. She would also meet Natalie Sorkin who had moved to the United States and Sorkin's husband She kept a detailed diary of the trip, which was published in France in 1948 with the title America Day by Day. She wrote to him across the Atlantic as "my beloved husband." Algren won the National Book Award for The Man with the Golden Arm in 1950, and in 1954, Beauvoir won France's most prestigious literary prize for The Mandarins, in which Algren is the character Lewis Brogan. Algren vociferously objected to their intimacy becoming public. Years after they separated, she was buried wearing his gift of a silver ring.

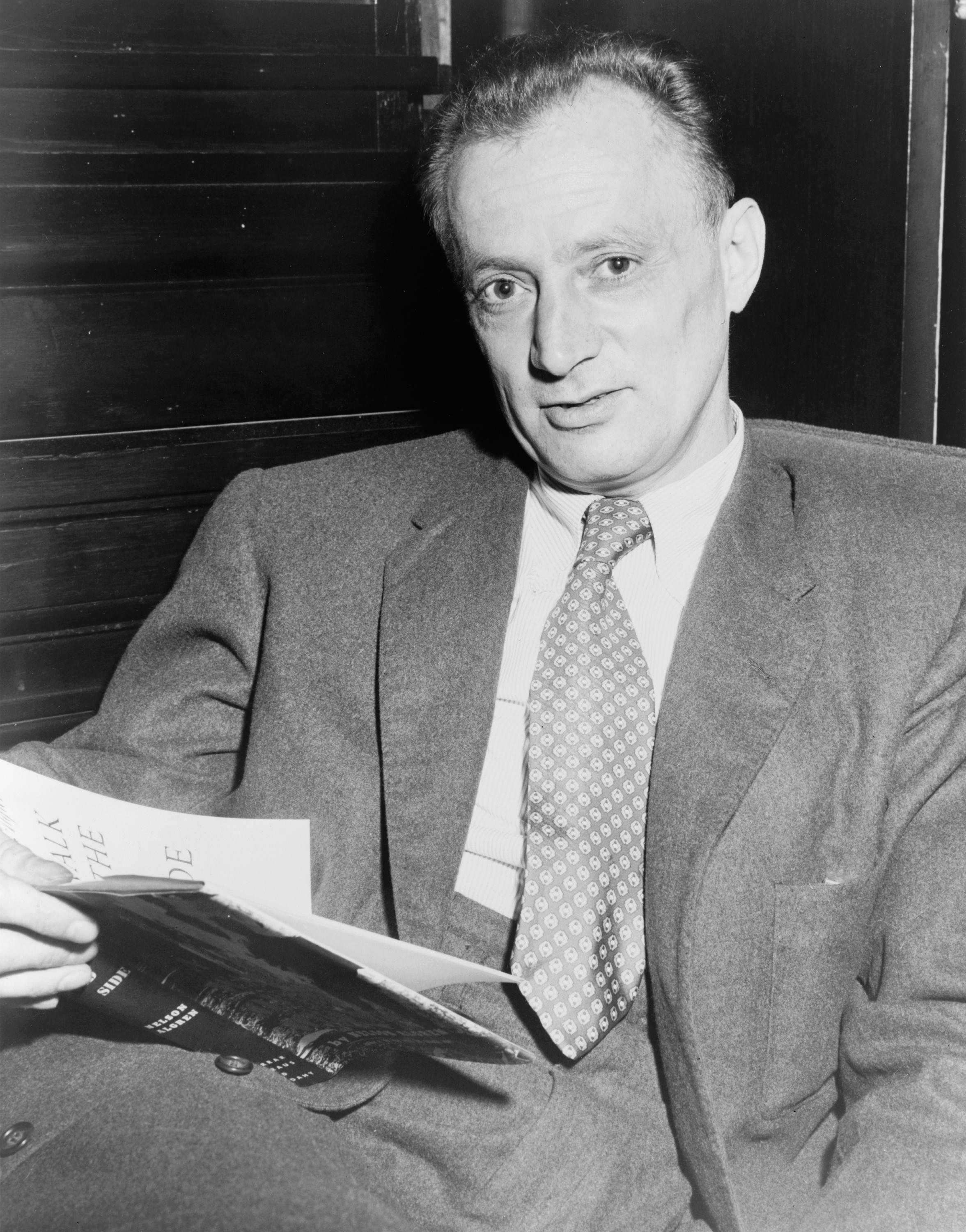
Algren in 1956

When Beauvoir visited Algren in Chicago, Art Shay took well-known nude and portrait photos of Beauvoir. Shay also wrote a play based on Algren, Beauvoir, and Sartre's triangular relationship. The play was stage read in 1999 in Chicago.

She lived with Claude Lanzmann from 1952 to 1959 in Montparnasse near her childhood home. In 1955 she published Les Temps Moderne in support of Algerian independence and three essays called Privileges which questioning how the privileged can question their situation, and stated the privileged number be not ignorant of hierarchies to address them. Beauvoir would later write a defense of Djamila Boupacha and helped set up a committee for her defense. This greatly angered many people, to the point that she received death threats and Sartre's home was bombed so anti-fascist students stayed at her apartment to protect her. In the 1950s she would run into her cousin Jacques who was a ruined alcoholic, whom she would send financial support.

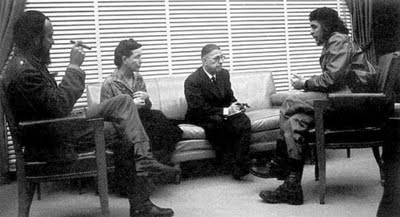
Antonio Núñez Jiménez, Beauvoir, Sartre and Che Guevara in Cuba, 1960.

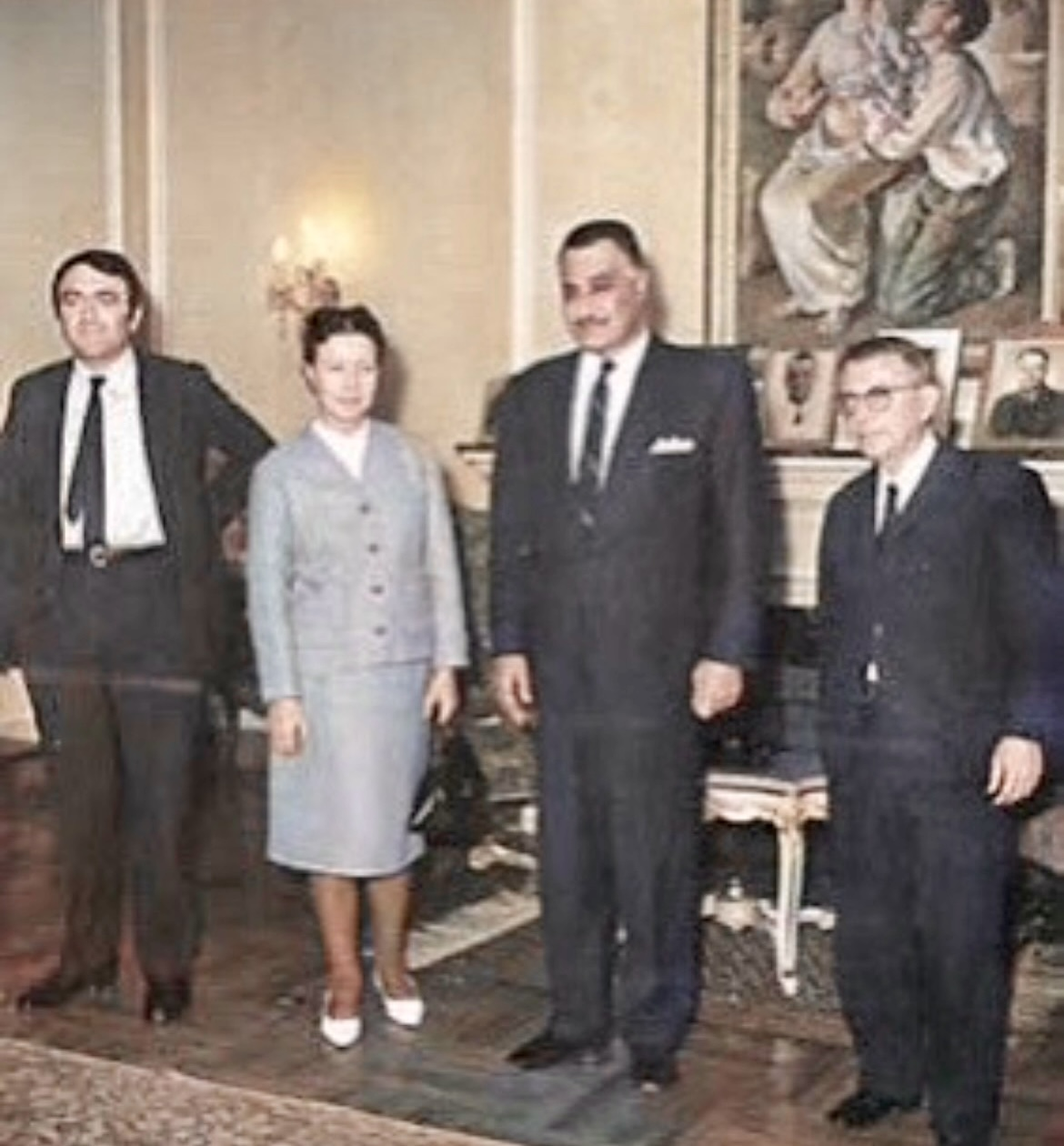
Egypt's President Gamal Abdel Nasser, Beauvoir, Sartre and Claude Lanzmann in Cairo, 1967.

In 1954, Beauvoir would win the Prix Goncourt for Les Mandarins. She celebrated privately with Satre, Olga, and Bost rejecting fanfare and publicity. Beauvoir was clear that this was a re-working of ideas she had before the met Sartre.

==== Autobiographical and travel writing ====
Beauvoir also wrote a four-volume autobiography, consisting of Memoirs of a Dutiful Daughter, The Prime of Life, Force of Circumstance (sometimes published in two volumes in English translation: After the War and Hard Times), and All Said and Done. In 1964 Beauvoir published a novella-length autobiography, A Very Easy Death, covering the time she spent visiting her aging mother, who was dying of cancer. The novella brings up questions of ethical concerns with truth-telling in doctor-patient relationships.

Beauvoir wrote popular travel diaries, such as America Day by Day, about time spent in the United States. She published essays and fiction rigorously, especially throughout the 1950s and 1960s. Her 1955 travels in China were the basis of her 1957 travelogue The Long March, in which she praised the efforts of the Chinese communists to emancipate women. Beauvoir would soon critique her one work in The Long March.

In her travel writing, Beauvoir analyses labor struggle, gender politics, family, political economy, and the relations between custom, law, and freedom, typically through a materialist framework. In this way, her travel writing is also philosophical and political.

==== Biographical period and short stories ====
From 1958 to 1963, Beauvoir published her autobiography in three volumes, though a fourth volume would be released in 1974. Beauvoir would then write short stories including A Very Easy Death in 1964 acting a reflection on the last weeks of her mother's life, and The Woman Destroyed which, like some of her other later work, deals with ageing. In 1967-67 Beauvoir would publish, Misunderstanding in Moscow, coming at a time when she would revoke her former support for the Soviets due to freedoms concerns.

==== Meeting Sylvie Le Bon-de Beauvoir ====
Sylvie Le Bon-de Beauvoir and Simone de Beauvoir met in the 1960s, when Beauvoir was in her fifties, and Sylvie was nineteen. In 1980, Beauvoir, 72, legally adopted Sylvie, who was in her late thirties, by which point they had already been in an intimate relationship for decades. Although Beauvoir rejected the institution of marriage her entire life, this adoption was like a marriage for her. Some scholars argue that this adoption was not to secure a literary heir for Beauvoir but as a form of resistance to the bio-heteronormative family unit.

==== Political activism ====
In the 1970s, Beauvoir became active in France's women's liberation movement. She wrote and signed the Manifesto of the 343 in 1971, a manifesto that included a list of famous women who claimed to have had an abortion, then illegal in France. Signatories were diverse as Catherine Deneuve, Delphine Seyrig, and Beauvoir's sister Hélène. In 1974, abortion was legalized in France.

Beauvoir wrote The Coming of Age in 1970, which offered a difficult account of aging and associated oppression in western capitalism. In this work, Beauvoir provides similar points of The Second Sex to the elderly.

Beauvoir did not declare herself a feminist until 1972, and did so in an interview in Le Nouvel Observateur at which she point she joined other Marxist femists in founding the Questions Féministes journal.

When asked in a 1975 interview with Betty Friedan if she would support a minimum wage for women who do housework, Beauvoir answered: "No, we don't believe that any woman should have this choice. No woman should be authorized to stay at home and raise her children. Society should be different. Women should not have that choice, precisely because if there is such a choice, too many women will make that one. It is a way of forcing women in a certain direction", further stating that motherhood "should be a choice, and not a result of conditioning".

In about 1976, Beauvoir and Sylvie Le Bon made a trip to New York City in the United States to visit Kate Millett on her farm.

In 1977, Beauvoir signed a petition along with other French intellectuals that supported the freeing of three arrested paedophiles. The petition explicitly addresses the 'Affaire de Versailles', where three adult men, Dejager (age 45), Gallien (age 43), and Burckhardt (age 39) had sexual relations with minors of both sexes aged 12–13.

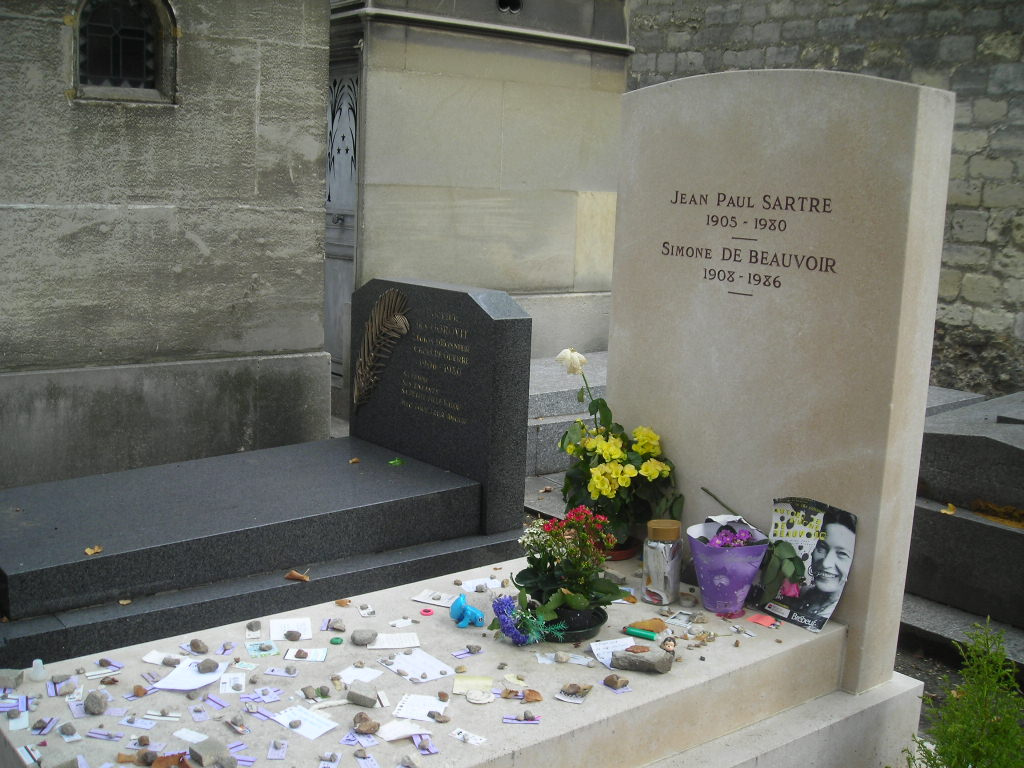
Beauvoir's and Sartre's grave at the Cimetière du Montparnasse.

She contributed the piece "Feminism – Alive, Well, and in Constant Danger" to the 1984 anthology Sisterhood Is Global: The International Women's Movement Anthology, edited by Robin Morgan.

==== Jean-Paul Sartre's death ====
Beauvoir clearly saw herself as someone tasked with preserving Sartre's legacy in his mental and physical decline, but also pushed back on him asking why he did not speak out for women the way he did for workers, blacks, and Jews

In 1981, she wrote La Cérémonie des adieux (A Farewell to Sartre), a painful account of Sartre's last years. In the opening of Adieux, Beauvoir notes that it is the only major published work of hers that Sartre did not read before its publication.

After Sartre died in 1980, Beauvoir published his letters to her with edits to spare the feelings of people in their circle who were still living. After Beauvoir's death, Sartre's adopted daughter and literary heir Arlette Elkaïm would not let many of Sartre's letters be published in unedited form. Most of Sartre's letters available today have Beauvoir's edits, which include a few omissions but mostly the use of pseudonyms. Beauvoir's adopted daughter and literary heir Sylvie Le Bon, unlike Elkaïm, published Beauvoir's unedited letters to both Sartre and Algren.

After Sartre's death, she published Adieu, accounting for Sartre's death, which was harshly received as many critiqued her for what they considered speaking for him (381). Many papers announcing his death, did not mention her, or only mentioned her as companion. Upon publishing the letters, Beauvoir damaged friendships with Olga and others who did not want to be shown in them.

==== Death ====
Beauvoir gave interviews towards the end of her life discussing her independence from Sartre, the damage their relationship caused to other parties, and Sartre's poor treatment of women.She also still engaged in writing, encouraging activism, and provided financial support to women's shelters and feminist publishers and writing prefaces to books she supported, the last of which was Mihloud. In 1982, François Mitterrand offered her the Legion of Honor, but she refused it. She also pushed for a new English translation of The Second Sex which better held to the truth of her Philosophy.

Beauvoir died of pneumonia on 14 April 1986 in Paris, aged 78. She is buried next to Sartre at the Montparnasse Cemetery in Paris. She was honoured as a figure at the forefront of the struggle for women's rights around the time of her death.

== Philosophy ==
=== Existentialist ethics ===
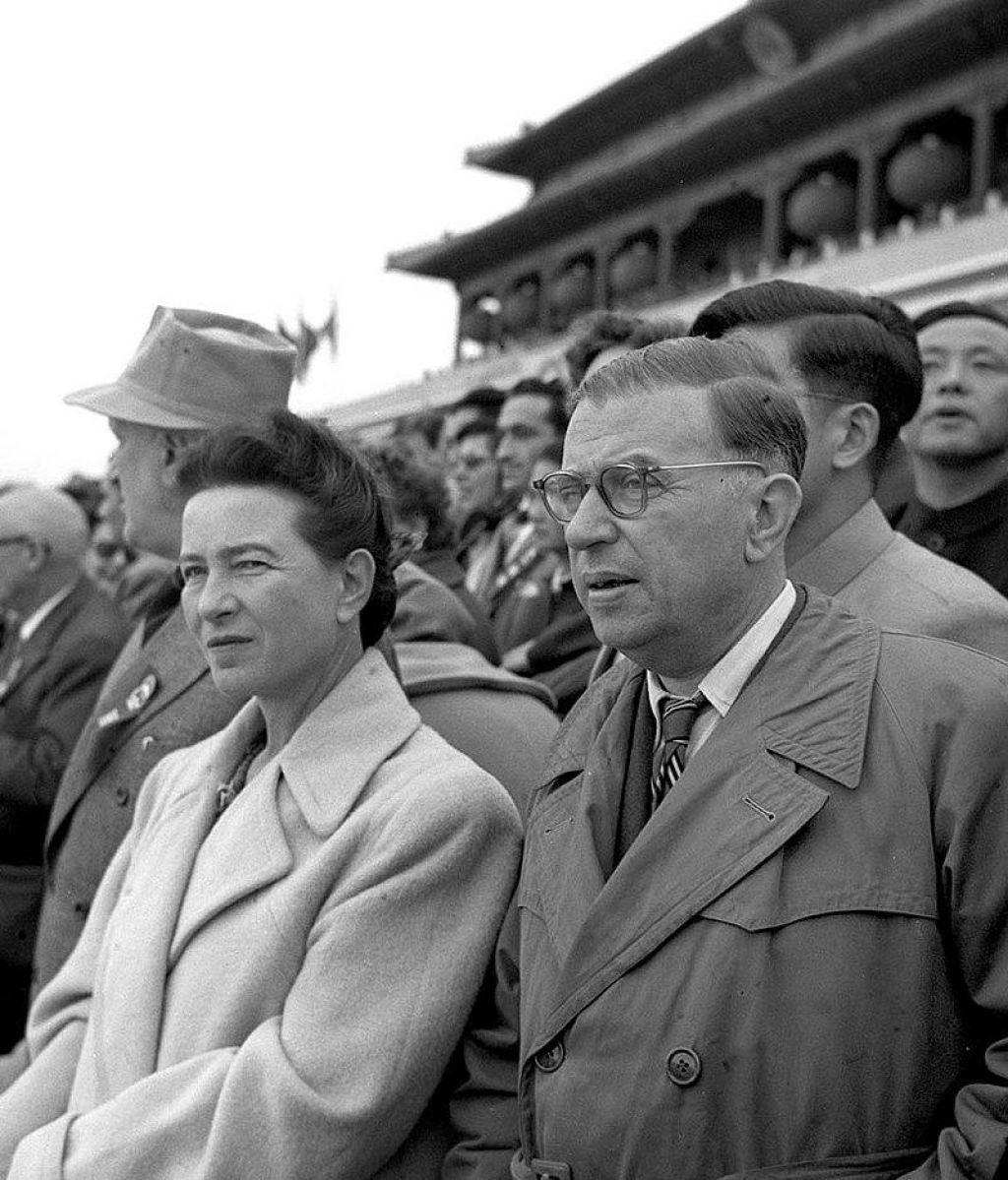
Simone de Beauvoir and Jean-Paul Sartre in Beijing, 1955

Beauvoir wrote her first philosophical essay on existentialist ethics titled Pyrrhus et Cinéas (1944). The characters Pyrrhus and Cineas have a socratic dialogue to discuss questions such as 'What are the criteria of ethical action?' and 'Can violence ever be justified?'.

She continued her exploration of existentialism through her second essay The Ethics of Ambiguity (1947).

She identifies herself as an existentialist and identifies existentialism as the philosophy of our (her) times because it is the only philosophy that takes the question of evil seriously. It is the only philosophy prepared to counter Dostoevsky's claim [in The Brothers Karamazov] that without God everything is permissible.

— Debra Bergoffen, Simone de Beauvoir, The Stanford Encyclopedia of Philosophy (Fall 2010 Edition)

'But what will become of men then?' I asked him, 'without God and immortal life? All things are lawful then, they can do what they like?'

— Dmitri, in Fyodor Mikhailovich Dostoevsky, The Brothers Karamazov, Part IV Book XI Chapter 4

Only the authentically moral attitude understands that the freedom of the self requires the freedom of others. To act alone or without concern for others is not to be free. As Beauvoir explains, "No project can be defined except by its interference with other projects."

— Shannon Mussett, Simone de Beauvoir (1908—1986), The Internet Encyclopedia of Philosophy

==== Meaning and Projects ====
In Pyrrhus and Cineas Beauvoir argues that pursuing projects is central to being human, as humans have no essence, they must create themselves from their actions with self-creation being its own form of project. Beauvoir states we are always transcending (meaning acting) even through thoughts and desires and, therefore, it is impossible not to engage in projects. Per Beauvoir, projects have a point or purpose (meaning), and thus life only has a point or purpose when we are engaged in them, so completing a goal or tasks might actually reduce one's meaning in life. Therefore, one must find meaning through always having and completing new projects. Beauvoir also states that projects of projects can be meaningful, insofar as someone else actually uses it (such as a book being read, or an institution being created) but may not still have meaning to the originator's life, if they no longer participate in an action towards it. If a project is never used by another human beyond the person who performed the project has no real meaning. As such, humanity is necessary for the existence of meaningful projects and human projects are meaningful insofar as humans exist with Beauvoir stating "My project loses all meaning not if my death is announced, but if the end of the world is announced to me".

==== Freedom and Choice ====
For Beauvoir choosing a particular project creates value through the act of choosing. We do not pursue projects because they are valuable but projects are valuable because we choose them, thus the act of choice is what creates value. Beauvoir states that this choice is valuable because it is an expression of freedom, from which all other values are sourced as human beings, with freedom, may make choices that create values. Beauvoir argues that other people's freedom is as valuable as our own, and thus projects that infringe on the freedom of others are meaningless. For example, in the book, Pyrrhus's goal to take over the world is rejected because it would infringe on the freedom of others. In The Ethics of Ambiguity, Beauvoir states that oppression is an absurd (thus meaningless) project.

Beauvoir's work on Pyrrhus and Cineas countered Sartre's views on freedom as she states our choices are constrained by the choices of others, and we constrain their choices too. Striving to be free, therefore, was not good enough as any person who valued freedom had to value freedom in people and act in such a way that they exercised their freedom ethically. In Pyrrhus and Cineas Beauvoir stated that every person needs the freedom of other people, and evil consists of denying others freedom and only in the freedom of others can we deny thinking of ourselves as objects. Evil consists of denying freedom and we have a responsibility to affirm our own freedom and shape the future and present to ensure the freedom of others in such a way that we and others may be free. Beauvoir extends this to romantic and sexual ethics, stating that love must be reciprocal with both parties free, conscious, and committed and in cases where love includes sex everyone must be treated as a sexual subject, not object.

Beauvoir rejected Christian and moralist views that stated we are by nature sinful or by nature driven by self-interest, which she considered deterministic rather than free to resist injustices, and stated that people are hesitant to admit that virtue is both possible and difficult. Beauvoir felt people needed equilibrium, in which people gave themselves without annihilating consciousness of themselves in order to serve others. As she began her novel She Came to Stay and started to move forward a concept that freedoms are not equal, because situations are different freedoms are also different. In Ethics of Ambiguity, Beauvoir argues against the idea that without God all things are permitted, arguing that without God to forgive us we are fully responsible for our actions. Beauvoir argues against efforts to run away from ambiguity with utopian visions or religion, which falsely make the ends justify means or sacrifice the present for the future.

===== Situational and Moral Freedom =====
Scholars debate the extent to which Beauvoir disagreed with Sartre about the nature of freedom, with contemporary scholars pointing Sartre's changing definitions as he aged. This change moved from absolute freedom in which one is always free even in extreme circumstances and we cannot judge anyone to be more free than another to a more situational concept as he aged. Throughout her early and late work, Beauvoir conceived of freedom differently, and through situated and conditional freedom in which "freedom is disclosed in and by a situation".

Beauvoir also developed the concept of moral freedom, which is "a is a willed relation to one's freedom-as-transcendence and to the ideal of moral freedom, which involves recognizing our indeterminacy and interdependence and adopting freedom as an end for oneself and others". Beauvoir separates being free and choosing to live freely. Per Beauvoir, we are free because we are human beings who can choose, act, and change but we can also deny or give up that freedom or prevent others from exercising their freedom. Therefore, moral freedom means recognizing our own freedom, taking responsibility for it, and wanting the same freedom for other people. In this sense, freedom is not just something one has but it is also something one must work toward with others, in interdependence "as our freedoms support each other like the stones in an arch".

==== Aging, Class, and Gender Impacts ====
Beauvoir's concept of situational and conditional freedoms means freedoms are limited by factors such as age, race, gender, and class and that efforts must be made to advance freedom for people in these situations.

===== Age =====
Per Beauvoir, children experience the joys of freedom but not the anxieties of freedom, believing their place in the world is secure which ends in adolescence, whereas old age can make projects difficult. Many of the proletariat spend their lives performing labor, meaning they cannot develop long-term meaningful projects, thus when they are old and unable to perform that labor it is revealed they have no meaningful projects. Beauvoir also shows that meaningful projects are partially a privilege and one that is denied to the poor and the oppressed. Beauvoir also states the elderly can spend more time being rather than doing, and more time looking in the past rather than forward, which can reduce their projects. Beauvoir expressed, in several works including in All Men Are Mortal, that life without death would be meaningless. Mortality is seen as necessary for a meaningful life because an immortal being would lose motivation to do anything, and without action, they cannot have a meaningful life.

In Old Age, Beauvoir states that there are different ways of viewing the self, including the "other in me" (built through relationships with others), the "look" and the "forever present me" which is the lens of present experience. Awareness of aging may first arise through others, but becomes part of one's own existence, and as such the self cannot be separately clearly between external social experiences and internal individual selfhood. These concepts relate to Sartre's work in Being and Nothingness. Before entering old age, Beauvoir argues that no single perception of the self completely defines how one is seen by others, but "self as other" consists of aspects that can be questioned or challenged. As one ages, struggling against perceptions becomes harder as the aging body increasingly becomes an object viewed and judged by others rather than mainly experienced from within, ultimately othering and alienating the aging person.

===== Gender =====
Beauvoir states that many tasks available to women, such as housework, are repetitive, cyclical, and unsatisfying which is unlike meaningful projects that involve progression, production, and creativity. Additionally, many of these tasks are imposed on them, rather than tasks freely chosen. Thus women become an other, rather than a subject, and even may choose to become another finding their meaning through an imposed value of marriage and care instead of freely chosen project themselves.

In The Second Sex Beauvoir also examines the relation between gender and class-struggle, affecting freedom from both gendered and economic impacts. Beauvoir states that women workers in the industrial age were presented with new economic opportunity, but were exploited, at risk of sexual violence, and taught to be docile reducing their will to unionize. Beauvoir presents a socialist feminism, focused on the relationship between gender/class circumstances and freedom.

===== Class =====
Beauvoir argued that we must make the conditions that support freedom possible for the self and others with an obligation to sustain those conditions. Beauvoir argues those conditions include the material (including a quality standard of living for everyone) and political (in the form of open discourse, free association, and no censorship). In this way, Beauvoir argues her support for both leftist causes (ensuring the standard of living) and against totalitarianism (that would limit freedom). For Beauvoir, one cannot claim or exercise freedom without affirming and supporting the material and political freedom of others.

==== Political Thought ====
For Beauvoir, one's freedom is concretely interdependent with the freedoms of others, creating interdependence. This interdependence creates a basis for socialism which includes existentialist ethics of freedom and socialist politics which allow people to be free by eliminating class oppression, racism, and patriarchy.

Beauvoir supports actively working towards a community of allies towards freedom which involves permission to struggle against oppression, and working to create the conditions of freedom, health, leisure and security to find allies in freedom. However, Beauvoir does not assume a utopia stating that because there are different social, historical, and economic positions, someone will likely always be an obstacle to another's freedom thus humanity is to some extent condemned to violence, which she does not endorse but views as inevitable in an effort to create free allies.

Beauvoir addresses punishment in both Eye for an Eye and her work surrounding Djamila Boupacha in the Algerian War. For Beauvoir there is tragedy of ambiguity because each person is an isolated subjective experience that coexists with others. Beauvoir argues that revenge "retains a whiff of magic" that "strives to satisfy some unknown dark god of symmetry" but that revenge has no goal outside of itself as punishment can never restore what was lost. Revenge can only temporarily reverse the situation by forcing others to confront their own tragic ambiguity, rather than respecting their freedom. Criminal courts replace personal revenge with the state's authority to punish. Once an offender appears in court they are no longer treated as the people who committed the crime but just as abstract symbols of the values society rejects. Trials, therefore, become a performance that reinforces the authority of the law rather than actually responding to the original harm. For Beauvoir this creates a disconnect between the crime and its punishment. Because time separates the offender from the original act Beauvoir feels that punishment can only grasp a "mirage of exteriority" and that justice becomes abstract and ultimately fails to truly connect punishment to the crime. Beauvoir does not argue that punishment should always be avoided, particularly when an offender poses a continued threat to the community.

During the Algerian war, Beauvoir updated her philosophy away from abstract ethical language towards a materialist framework focused on need and "embodied empathy". Beauvoir was strongly opposed to the use of torture, and upset by public complicity in it.

Beauvoir had a complex relationship with the French Communist Party, which she never formally joined. Beauvoir saw the French Communists as less evil than the capitalist and imperialist West, but was also skeptical of the party's comfort with Stalin. The party, which Sartre partially joined, was also skeptical of Beauvoir, who they thought was too remote from the working class. While Beauvoir considered Marx foundational to her work and The Second Sex, it was largely rejected by both the French right-wing and left-wing upon publication.

==== Novel as Philosophy ====
Beauvoir chose to write novels because they give us "imaginary experiences that are as complete and disturbing as lived experience". She felt that literature could bridge the gap between philosophy and the real world. Beauvoir was not considered a philosopher by many upon her death in part because she chose to embed philosophical in novels, instead of creating a systematic philosophical system.

== The Second Sex ==
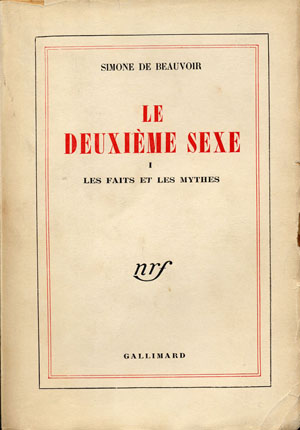
The Second Sex

The Second Sex, first published in 1949 in French as Le Deuxième Sexe, turns the existentialist mantra that existence precedes essence into a feminist one: "One is not born, but rather becomes, woman" (French: "On ne naît pas femme, on le devient"). With this famous phrase, Beauvoir first articulated what has come to be known as the sex-gender distinction, that is, the distinction between biological sex and the social and historical construction of gender and its attendant stereotypes. She draws on narrative accounts of womens' experience to reveal how sexual differences are used to trap women in the role of the "Other".

Beauvoir defines women as the "second sex" because women are defined as inferior to men. She pointed out that Aristotle argued women are "female by virtue of a certain lack of qualities", while Thomas Aquinas referred to women as an "imperfect man" and the "incidental" being. She writes: "In itself, homosexuality is as limiting as heterosexuality: the ideal should be to be capable of loving a woman or a man; either, a human being, without feeling fear, restraint, or obligation."

Beauvoir asserted that women are as capable of choice as men, and thus can choose to elevate themselves, moving beyond the "immanence" to which they were previously resigned and reaching "transcendence", a position in which one takes responsibility for oneself and the world, where one chooses one's freedom.

Chapters of The Second Sex were originally published in Les Temps modernes, in June 1949. The second volume came a few months after the first in France. It was published soon after in America due to the quick translation by Howard Parshley, as prompted by Blanche Knopf, wife of publisher Alfred A. Knopf. Because Parshley had only a basic familiarity with the French language and a minimal understanding of philosophy (he was a professor of biology at Smith College), much of Beauvoir's book was mistranslated or inappropriately cut, distorting her intended message. For years, Knopf prevented the introduction of a more accurate retranslation of Beauvoir's work, declining all proposals despite the efforts of existentialist scholars.

Only in 2009 was there a second translation, to mark the 60th anniversary of the original publication. Constance Borde and Sheila Malovany-Chevallier produced the first integral translation in 2010, reinstating a third of the original work.

In the chapter "Woman: Myth and Reality" of The Second Sex, Beauvoir argued that men had made women the "Other" in society by the application of a false aura of "mystery" around them. She argued that men used this as an excuse not to understand women or their problems and not to help them, and that this stereotyping was always done in societies by the group higher in the hierarchy to the group lower in the hierarchy. She wrote that a similar kind of oppression by hierarchy also happened in other categories of identity, such as race, class, and religion, but she claimed that it was nowhere more true than with gender in which men stereotyped women and used it as an excuse to organize society into a patriarchy.

Despite her contributions to the feminist movement, especially the French women's liberation movement, and her beliefs in women's economic independence and equal education, Beauvoir was initially reluctant to call herself a feminist. However, after observing the resurgence of the feminist movement during the late 1960s and early 1970s, Beauvoir stated she no longer believed a socialist revolution to be enough to bring about women's liberation. She publicly declared herself a feminist in 1972 in an interview with Le Nouvel Observateur.

In 2018, the manuscript pages of The Second Sex were published.

== Other notable works ==
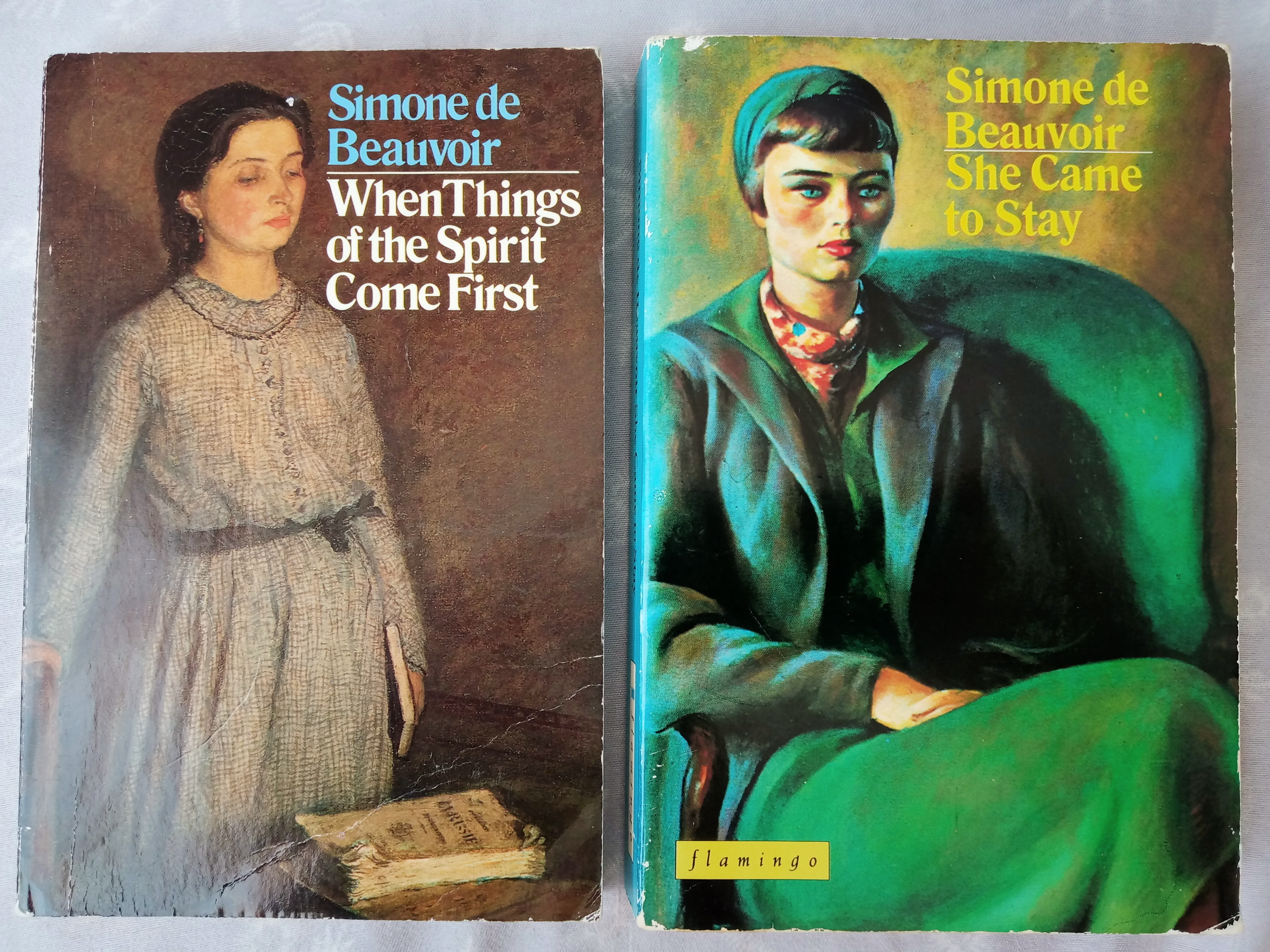
De Beauvoir's When Things of the Spirit Come First and She Came to Stay, both published by Flamingo Press.

=== She Came to Stay ===
Beauvoir published her first novel She Came to Stay in 1943. It has been assumed that it is inspired by her and Sartre's sexual relationship with Olga Kosakiewicz and Wanda Kosakiewicz. Olga was one of her students in the Rouen secondary school where Beauvoir taught during the early 1930s. She grew fond of Olga. Sartre tried to pursue Olga but she rejected him, so he began a relationship with her sister, Wanda. Upon his death, Sartre was still supporting Wanda. He also supported Olga for years, until she met and married Jacques-Laurent Bost, a lover of Beauvoir. However, the main thrust of the novel is philosophical, a scene in which to situate Beauvoir's abiding philosophical pre-occupation – the relationship between the self and the other.

In the novel, set just before the outbreak of World War II, Beauvoir creates one character from the complex relationships of Olga and Wanda. The fictionalised versions of Beauvoir and Sartre have a ménage à trois with the young woman. The novel also delves into Beauvoir and Sartre's complex relationship and how it was affected by the ménage à trois.

She Came to Stay was followed by many others, including The Blood of Others, which explores the nature of individual responsibility, telling a love story between two young French students participating in the Resistance during World War II.

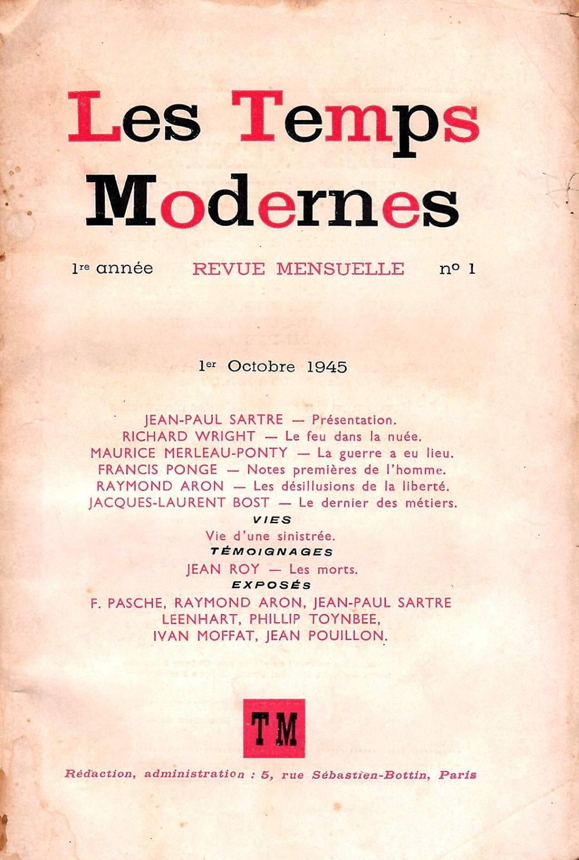
Les Temps Modernes first issue cover.

=== Les Temps Modernes ===
Beauvoir, Sartre, and Maurice Merleau-Ponty co-founded Les Temps Modernes, a monthly political journal that featured varied ideologies such as communists, Catholics, Gaullists, and socialists. Sartre wrote the purpose of Les Temps Modernes in the Preface of the first issue published on 1 October 1945.

Every writer of bourgeois origin has known the temptation of irresponsibility. I personally hold Flaubert personally responsible for the repression that followed the Commune because he did not write a line to try to stop it. It was not his business, people will perhaps say. Was the Calas trial Voltaire's business? Was Dreyfus's condemnation Zola's business? We at Les Temps Modernes do not want to miss a beat on the times we live in. Our intention is to influence the society we live in. Les Temps Modernes will take sides.

— Jean-Paul Sartre, Les Temps Modernes, Preface

Beauvoir used Les Temps Modernes to promote her own work and explore her ideas on a small scale before fashioning essays and books. Beauvoir remained an editor until her death. However, Sartre and Merleau-Ponty had a longstanding feud, which led Merleau-Ponty to leave Les Temps modernes. Beauvoir sided with Sartre and ceased to associate with Merleau-Ponty. In Beauvoir's later years, she hosted the journal's editorial meetings in her flat and contributed more than Sartre, whom she often had to force to offer his opinions.

Les Temps Modernes was at the center of French intellectual life for many decades. The journal covered many topics including essays on race issues in the United States, articles condemning French actions in Algeria, analysis of life in the Soviet Union, contributions from authors from former European colonies covering race and colonialism, and analysis of Israeli-Arab conflicts. Beauvoir and Sartre both opposed capitalism, but the journal remained neutral on the Cold War, opposed both to American racism and against the Stalinist misappropriation of Marx that resulted in oppression.

=== The Mandarins ===
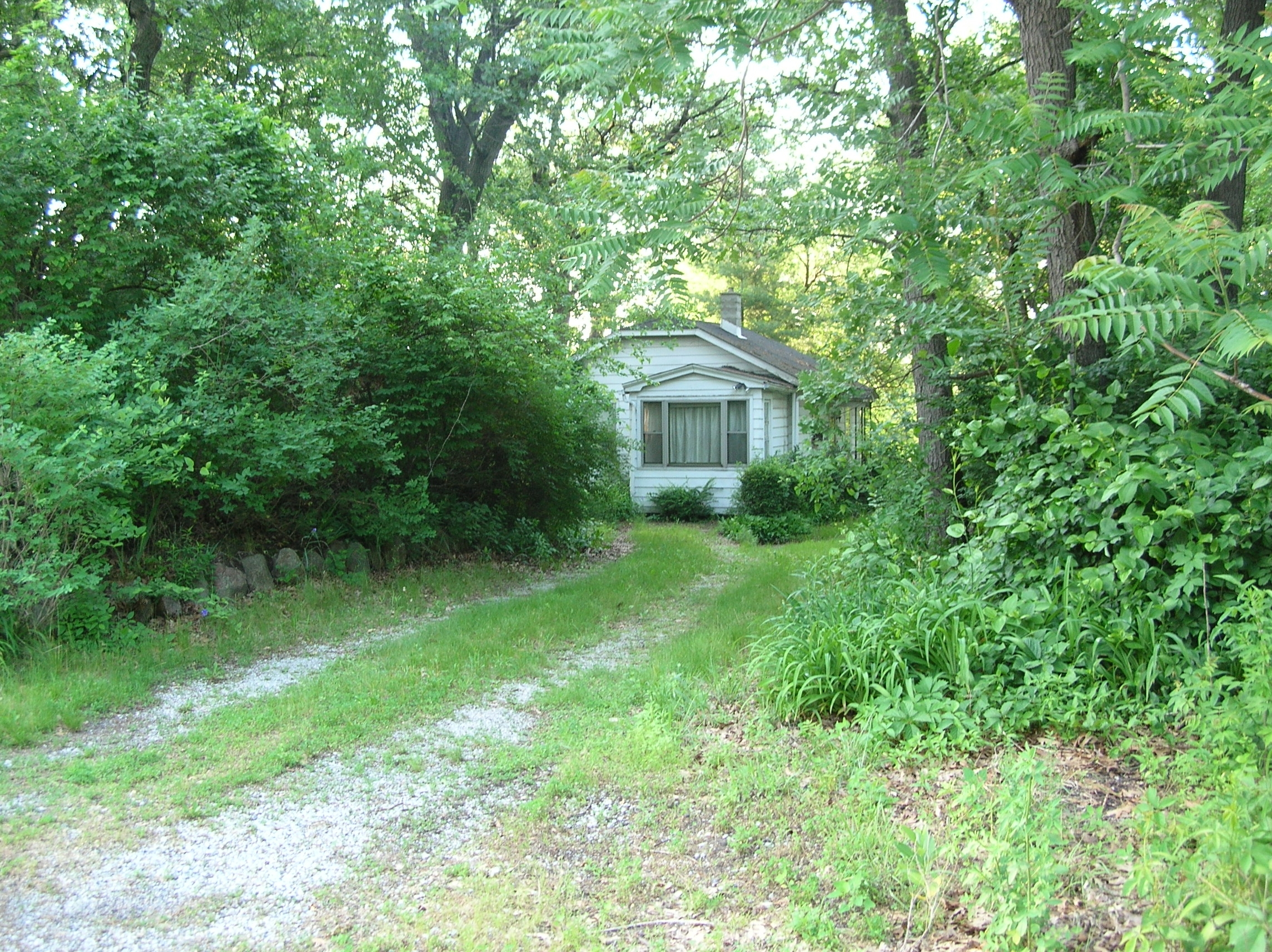
Dunes cottage where Algren and Beauvoir summered in Miller Beach, Indiana

Published in 1954, The Mandarins won France's highest literary prize, the Prix Goncourt. It is a roman à clef set after the end of World War II and follows the personal lives of philosophers and friends among Sartre's and Beauvoir's intimate circle, including her relationship with American writer Nelson Algren, to whom the book is dedicated.

Algren was outraged by the frank way Beauvoir described their sexual experiences in both The Mandarins and her autobiographies. Algren vented his outrage when reviewing American translations of Beauvoir's work. Much material bearing on this episode in Beauvoir's life, including her love letters to Algren, entered the public domain only after her death.

=== Les Inséparables ===
Beauvoir's early novel Les Inséparables, long suppressed, was published in French in 2020 and two different English translations in 2021, by Sandra Smith in the US and Lauren Elkin in the UK. Written in 1954, the book describes her first love, a classmate named Elisabeth Lacoin ("Zaza") who died before age 22 of viral encephalitis, and had as a teenager a "passionate and tragic" relationship with Beauvoir. According to Sylvie Le Bon-de Beauvoir, Beauvoir never forgave Madame Lacoin for what happened, believing that Elisabeth-Zaza was murdered by the oppressive socio-cultural environment in which she had been raised. Disapproved by Sartre, the novel was deemed "too intimate" to be published during Beauvoir's lifetime.

== Relationships impact on work and image ==
Beauvoir states in All Said in Done that she had a hard time distinguishing between the "I" and the "we" because she always had someone around and later described solitude as a form of death. Beauvoir's prominent open relationships at times overshadowed her academic reputation. A scholar who was lecturing with her chastised their "distinguished [Harvard] audience [because] every question asked about Sartre concerned his work, while all those asked about Beauvoir concerned her personal life."

Beauvoir connected with Sartre on an intellectual level, stating that he 'is in my heart, in my body and above all the incomparable friend of my thought.' Sartre and Beauvoir always read each other's work, and debate continues about the extent to which they influenced each other in their existentialist works, such as Sartre's Being and Nothingness and Beauvoir's She Came to Stay and "Phenomenology and Intent". Beauvoir encouraged Sartre to make Nausea a novel, and Sartre credited her with influencing the book having her own concept of being and nothingness before Sartre began the book. Sartre was not always supportive; in 1929, when Beauvoir told Sartre about her ideas about pluralistic ethics, Sartre critiqued her intellectual capacity.

However, recent studies of Beauvoir's work focus on influences other than Sartre, including Hegel and Leibniz. The Neo-Hegelian revival led by Alexandre Kojève and Jean Hyppolite in the 1930s inspired a whole generation of French thinkers, including Sartre, to discover Hegel's Phenomenology of Spirit. However, Beauvoir, reading Hegel in German during the war, produced an original critique of his dialectic of consciousness. In contemporary times, Beauvoir has been criticized for having hurtful romantic and sexual relationships with three of her former students, two of whom also had relationships with Sartre.

Beauvoir published a series of letters Sartre sent to her and kept a number of student-era diaries, not published in English until 2008 and letters to Claude Lanzmann which were not available until 2018. These documents show that Beauvoir presented herself in her autobiography somewhat differently than she had lived, particularly in her relationship with Sartre. When Beauvoir's letters to Algren were published in 1997, it created an uproar about the truth of her memoirs. In 2018 there was a new expanded edition of her biographies published in France with additional letters and materials and includes critiques of her belittlement next to Sartre. While her biographies presented Sartre as her primary romantic interest, in letters sold by Lanzmann to Yale, Beauvoir stated that her love with Sartre was without true reciprocity. Beauvoir had more significant romantic and sexual relationships with others including Lanzmann, Bost, and Algren but did not widely document these in her published biographies or letters, preferring to, at least publicly, center Sartre. Beauvoir was also intellectually engaged with others beyond Sartre including with Merleau-Ponty, Albert Camus and at times rejecting Sartre's ideas and developing her own independent ideas (though her work was commonly dismissed or assumed to be Sartre's by many papers). The day after her death Le Monde published an obituary saying her works were more "popularization than creation".

== Legacy ==
=== Impact ===
Beauvoir's The Second Sex is considered a foundational work in the history of feminism. Beauvoir had denied being a feminist multiple times, but ultimately admitted that she was one after The Second Sex became crucial in the world of feminism. The work has had a profound influence, opening the way for second-wave feminism in the United States, Canada, Australia, and around the world. Although Beauvoir has been quoted as saying, "There is a certain unreasonable demand that I find a little stupid because it would enclose me, immobilize me completely in a sort of feminist concrete block," her works on feminism have paved the way for all future feminists. The founders of the second-wave read The Second Sex in translation, including Kate Millett, Shulamith Firestone, Juliet Mitchell, Ann Oakley and Germaine Greer. All acknowledged their profound debt to Beauvoir, including visiting her in France, consulting with her at crucial moments, and dedicating works to her. Betty Friedan, whose 1963 book The Feminine Mystique is often regarded as the opening salvo of second-wave feminism in the United States, later said that reading The Second Sex in the early 1950s "led me to whatever original analysis of women's existence I have been able to contribute to the Women's movement and its unique politics. I looked to Simone de Beauvoir for a philosophical and intellectual authority."

Beauvoir's work has also been influential on existentialism, ethics, phenomenology, and political thought.

Beauvoir also had a rich relationship with many of her readers, who often wrote her letters in response to her work and to whom she commonly replied. One notable letter recipient from Beauvoir is Nobel laureate Annie Ernaux; in the letter, Beauvoir complimented Ernaux, saying she had a "a great talent" after the publication of Ernaux's first novel, Les Armoires vides (Cleaned Out).

At one point in the early 1970s, Beauvoir also aligned herself with the French League for Women's Rights as a means to campaign and fight against sexism in French society. Beauvoir's influence goes beyond just her impact on second-wave founders, and extends to numerous aspects of feminism, including literary criticism, history, philosophy, theology, criticism of scientific discourse, and psychotherapy. When Beauvoir first became involved with the feminism movement, one of her objectives was legalizing abortion. Donna Haraway wrote that, "despite important differences, all the modern feminist meanings of gender have roots in Simone de Beauvoir's claim that 'one is not born a woman [one becomes one].'" This "most famous feminist sentence ever written" is echoed in the title of Monique Wittig's 1981 essay One Is Not Born a Woman. Judith Butler took the concept a step further, arguing that Beauvoir's choice of the verb to become suggests that gender is a process, constantly being renewed in an ongoing interaction between the surrounding culture and individual choice. Beauvoir also influenced others such as Sara Ahmed, bell hooks, and Luce Irigaray.

New and improved translations of Beauvoir's work have grown interest in her philosophy. Important venues for study include the journal Simone de Beauvoir Studies was founded in 1983 and International Simone de Beauvoir Society.

There are several biographies on Beauvoir's life and work including Simone de Beauvoir—A Life of Freedom (1981) by Carol Ascher, Simone de Beauvoir: A Biography (1987) by Claude Francis and Fernande Gontier, Simone de Beauvoir (1990) by Deirdre Bair was written in cooperation of Beauvoir, Simone de Beauvoir: The Making of an Intellectual Woman (1994) by scholar Toril Moi includes additional theory and literary criticism, Simone de Beauvoir (2008) by Lisa Appignanesi, and Becoming Beauvoir (2019) by Kate Kirkpatrick which draws from newly published letters. Simone de Beauvoir: I Want It All from Life (2023) by Julia Korbik and illustrated by Julia Bernhard is a graphic novel about Beauvoir's life.

=== Memorials and Honors ===
In Paris, Place Jean-Paul-Sartre-et-Simone-de-Beauvoir is a square that honors Beauvoir and Sartre. It is one of the few squares in Paris to be officially named after a couple. The pair lived close to the square at 42 rue Bonaparte.

Beauvoir was honored by France during the 2024 Paris Olympics, among nine other women whose legacy is important to France. These women were commemorated with statues emerged from the Seine during the opening ceremony and were later permanently installed on the Rue de la Chapelle.

In 2019, Time created 89 new covers to celebrate women of the year starting from 1920; it chose Beauvoir for 1949.

The grave Beauvoir shares with Sartre in Montparnasse is a popular tourist spot, with visitors often leaving rocks, notes, and lipstick-stained kisses on the grave.

Many memorial plaques for Beauvoir can be found throughout Paris including the cafe where she wrote The Second Sex and The Mandarins and tours of Beauvoir's spots, and France's cafe culture, are often available including famous spaces such as Les Deux Magots.

== Prizes ==
- Prix Goncourt, 1954
- Jerusalem Prize, 1975
- Austrian State Prize for European Literature, 1978

== Works ==
=== Novels ===
- L'Invitée ("She Came to Stay", 1943)
- Le Sang des autres ("The Blood of Others", 1945)
- Tous les hommes sont mortels ("All Men Are Mortal", 1946)
- Les Mandarins ("The Mandarins", 1954)
- Les Belles Images ("Beautiful Images" / "The Image of Her", 1966)
- Malentendu à Moscou ("Misunderstanding in Moscow", 2013; posthumously published)
- Les Inséparables ("Inseparables", 2020; posthumously published)

=== Short stories ===
- L'Amérique au jour le jour ("America Day by Day", 1948)
- La Femme rompue ("The Woman Destroyed", 1967)
- Quand prime le spirituel ("When Things of the Spirit Come First", 1979)

=== Essays ===
- Pyrrhus et Cinéas ("Pyrrhus and Cineas", 1944)
- Pour une morale de l'ambiguïté ("The Ethics of Ambiguity", 1947)
- Le Deuxième Sexe ("The Second Sex", 1949)
- Privilèges ("Privileges", 1955)
  - Faut-il brûler Sade? ("Must We Burn Sade?")
  - La Pensée de droite, aujourd'hui ("Right-Wing Thought Today")
  - Merleau-Ponty et le pseudo-sartrisme ("Merleau-Ponty and Pseudo-Sartrism")
- La Longue Marche: essai sur la Chine ("The Long March: An Essay on China", 1957)
- La Vieillesse ("The Coming of Age", 1970)

=== Theatre ===
- Les Bouches inutiles ("Who Shall Die?", 1945)

=== Autobiographies ===
- Mémoires d'une jeune fille rangée ("Memoirs of a Dutiful Daughter", 1958)
- La Force de l'âge ("The Prime of Life", 1960)
- La Force des choses ("Force of Circumstance", 1963)
- Une mort très douce ("A Very Easy Death", 1964)
- Tout compte fait ("All Said and Done", 1972)
- La Cérémonie des adieux ("Adieux: A Farewell to Sartre", 1981)

=== Posthumous publications ===
- Lettres à Sartre, tome I: 1930–1939 (1990)
- Lettres à Sartre, tome II: 1940–1963 (1990)
- Journal de guerre, septembre 1939–janvier 1941 ("Wartime Diary", 1990)
- Lettres à Nelson Algren ("A Transatlantic Love Affair: Letters to Nelson Algren", 1997)
- Correspondance croisée avec Jacques-Laurent Bost (2004)
- Philosophical Writings (2004)
- Diary of a Philosophy Student, 1926–27 (2006)
- Cahiers de jeunesse, 1926–1930 (2008)

== See also ==
- Feminism in France
- Femmes solidaires
- List of women's rights activists
