= List of philosophical fiction authors =

This is a list of notable philosophical fiction authors and their works, in chronological order according to the author's year of birth.

Author	Years	Notable Works and/or Themes
Augustine of Hippo	354-430	De Magistro
Halevi, Judah	1075-1141	The Kuzari
Abelard, Peter	1079-1142	Dialogue of a Philosopher with a Jew and a Christian
Ibn Tufail	1105-1185	Hayy ibn Yaqdhan: explores the limits of natural theology and the Islamic concept of fitra
Machiavelli, Niccolò	1469–1527	The Mandrake
More, Thomas	1478-1535	Utopia: first unambiguous example of utopian and dystopian fiction.
Voltaire	1694-1778	Zadig; Micromegas; Candide
Johnson, Samuel	1709-1784	Rasselas
Rousseau, Jean-Jacques	1712-1778	Julie, or the New Heloise
Diderot, Denis	1713–1784	Jacques the Fatalist
Sade, Marquis de	1740–1814	Atheism; Nihilism; Libertinism: Justine, or The Misfortunes of Virtue; Philosophy in the Boudoir
Goethe	1749-1832	Wilhelm Meister's Apprenticeship
Jean Paul	1763–1825	Siebenkäs; Titan
Chateaubriand, François-René de	1768–1848	René
Hogg, James	1770-1835	The Private Memoirs and Confessions of a Justified Sinner
Hölderlin, Friedrich	1770–1843	Hyperion
Stendhal	1783-1842	The Red and the Black
Carlyle, Thomas	1795-1881	Sartor Resartus
Leopardi, Giacomo	1798-1837	Small Moral Works - Philosophical stories that were greatly enjoyed even by Arthur Schopenhauer.
Kierkegaard, Søren	1813-1855	Diary of a Seducer - A novel in the highly literary philosophical work Either/Or.
Turgenev, Ivan	1818-1883	Fathers and Sons
Dostoevsky, Fyodor	1821-1881	Existentialism: Crime and Punishment; The Brothers Karamazov; Notes from Underground
Chernyshevsky, Nikolay	1828-1889	Russian nihilism, Utopian socialism: What Is to Be Done?
Tolstoy, Leo	1828-1910	War and Peace; Resurrection
Pater, Walter	1839-1894	Marius the Epicurean
Nietzsche, Friedrich	1844-1900	Thus Spoke Zarathustra: Well-known example of a modern philosophical novel.
Santayana, George	1863–1952	
Unamuno, Miguel de	1864–1936	
Pirandello, Luigi	1867–1936	
Maxim Gorky	1868-1936	The Life of Klim Samgin
Proust, Marcel	1871-1922	In Search of Lost Time
Chesterton, G. K.	1874-1936	
Mann, Thomas	1875-1955	The Magic Mountain
Hesse, Hermann	1877-1962	Siddhartha
Andrei Bely	1880-1934	Petersburg
Musil, Robert	1880-1942	The Man Without Qualities
Papini, Giovanni	1881–1956	
Kafka, Franz	1883-1924	Existential Nihilism: The Trial
Broch, Hermann	1886-1951	The Death of Virgil
Céline, Louis-Ferdinand	1894-1961	Journey to the End of the Night
Huxley, Aldous	1894-1963	Brave New World - A critique on the conflict between the human element and animal nature of man as well as the manipulative use of psychological conditioning.; Island; After Many a Summer
Jünger, Ernst	1895–1998	Heliopolis; Eumeswil
Lewis, C. S.	1898-1963	Space Trilogy
Borges, Jorge Luis	1899-1986	Philosophical idealism; Eternal recurrence; Eternalism
Platonov, Andrei	1899-1951	The Foundation Pit
Saint-Exupéry, Antoine de	1900-1944	The Little Prince
Malraux, André	1901-1976	Man's Fate
Orwell, George	1903-1950	Animal Farm - A fable on the process of communism represented through animals on a farm.; Nineteen Eighty-Four - A critique of totalitarianism as well as a discourse on the manipulative use of language.
Rebatet, Lucien	1903–1972	Les Deux Étendards
Gombrowicz, Witold	1904-1969	Ferdydurke; Cosmos
Skinner, B. F.	1904-1990	Walden Two
Sartre, Jean-Paul	1905-1980	Existentialism: Nausea; No Exit - An existentialist play outlining Sartrean philosophy.; The Devil and the Good Lord - An existentialist play outlining Sartrean philosophy.
Rand, Ayn	1905-1982	Objectivism
Beckett, Samuel	1906-1989	Absurdism; Quasi-quietism: Waiting for Godot: One of the most well-known philosophical plays of the twentieth century.
Eliade, Mircea	1907–1986	The Forbidden Forest
Beauvoir, Simone de	1908-1986	Existentialism; Feminism: Les Bouches inutiles; She Came to Stay; All Men are Mortal; The Woman Destroyed
Dazai, Osamu	1909-1948	No Longer Human
Lima, José Lezama	1910-1976	Paradiso - Latin American Boom novel that explores desire in pre-revolution Cuba.
Camus, Albert	1913-1960	Absurdism
Ellison, Ralph	1913-1994	Invisible Man - Existentialism in America.
Schmidt, Arno	1914–1979	
Percy, Walker	1916-1990	The Moviegoer - An existential novel outlining Søren Kierkegaard's philosophy.
Burgess, Anthony	1917-1993	A Clockwork Orange - A discussion of the role of free will in the context of the application of behaviorism's techniques.
Murdoch, Iris	1919-1999	
Lispector, Clarice	1920-1977	The Hour of the Star
Dürrenmatt, Friedrich	1921-1990	
Lem, Stanislaw	1921-2006	
Mishima, Yukio	1925-1970	The Sailor Who Fell From Grace With The Sea
Markson, David	1927-2010	Wittgenstein's Mistress - An experimental novel that demonstrates Wittgenstein's philosophy of language; stylistic similarities to Tractatus Logico-Philosophicus.
Dick, Philip K.	1928-1982	Do Androids Dream of Electric Sheep?; A Scanner Darkly; VALIS - A novel version of his longer non-fiction book; The Exegesis, outlining his intense interest in the nature of reality, metaphysics and religion.
Pirsig, Robert M.	1928-2017	Zen and the Art of Motorcycle Maintenance - Pirsig's Metaphysics of Quality
Guin, Ursula K. Le	1929-2018	Anarchism; Feminism; Socialism; Daoism
Kundera, Milan	1929-2023	The Unbearable Lightness of Being
Wilson, Colin	1931–2013	Ritual in the Dark; The Mind Parasites
Eco, Umberto	1932-2016	Semiotics
Gardner, John	1933-1982	Grendel - An exploration of various philosophical perspectives on finding meaning in the world, the power of literature and myth, and the nature of good and evil. The protagonist is a literary proxy for Jean-Paul Sartre.
Berger, Arthur Asa	1933-	Postmortem for a Postmodernist - A murder mystery that explores postmodernism.
Renata Adler	1938-	Speedboat
Atwood, Margaret	1939-	The Handmaid's Tale - Dystopian feminist novel
Strauss, Botho	1944-	The Young Man
Bieri, Peter	1944-2023	
Sloterdijk, Peter	1947–	Der Zauberbaum
Bruckner, Pascal	1948-	
Gaarder, Jostein	1952-	Sophie's World
Sant, Gus Van	1952-	Pink - Absurdism
Shirley, John	1953-	The Other End - A novel about the global effects of an externally implemented planetary higher-consciousness, and an "alternative apocalypse", in gnostic-influenced metaphysics advocating Krishnamurtian/Gurdjieffian style awakening.
Alexis, André	1957-	Fifteen Dogs - Winner of the 2015 Scotiabank Giller Prize, this novel explores faith, place, love, power and hatred through the eyes and experiences of fifteen dogs endowed with human intelligence.
Dantec, Maurice G.	1959-2016	
Stephenson, Neal	1959-	Anathem - Includes the philosophical debate between Platonic realism and nominalism.
Wallace, David Foster	1962-2008	Infinite Jest - Criticizes Poststructuralism/Postmodernism; influenced by Wittgenstein & Existentialism; introduces Metamodernism/Post-postmodernism.
Jeppesen, Travis	1979-	Victims - Explores relativism in its relations to religious belief
Yudkowsky, Eliezer	1979-	Harry Potter and the Methods of Rationality: Explores cognitive science, philosophy, rationalism, the scientific method
Rebecca Goldstein	1983-	Atheism; Feminism
Dukaj, Jacek	1997-	Other Songs
Baran, Ivan	2014-	The Great Fall; Monsieur August
