= The Roads to Freedom (1970 serial) =

- Genre: Drama
- Based on: The Roads to Freedom by Jean-Paul Sartre
- Written by: David Turner
- Directed by: James Cellan Jones
- Starring: Michael Bryant; Daniel Massey; Rosemary Leach; Georgia Brown; Alison Fiske
- Opening theme: La Route est Dure
- Country of origin: United Kingdom
- Original language: English
- No. of series: 1
- No. of episodes: 13

Production
- Producer: David Conroy
- Running time: 45 minutes

Original release
- Network: BBC Two
- Release: 22 September – 27 December 1970

The Roads to Freedom is a British thirteen-part drama serial broadcast on BBC Two in 1970.

Based on the trilogy of novels by Jean-Paul Sartre, The Roads to Freedom deals with the lives of various people in Paris as war with Nazi Germany becomes inevitable. Unusually, the series makes much use of voiceover, using the characters' internal thoughts in the narrative. The series was adapted for television by David Turner and directed by James Cellan Jones. The serial was repeated in 1972 and again in 1977. In July 2022, it was announced that BBC Four would be repeating all 13 episodes. The introduction before the start of this rerun was by Colin Baker, who played the part of Claude.

== Script and reception ==
David Turner spent fifteen months on the script. While Sartre's trilogy is divided into three more or less equal parts – The Age of Reason, The Reprieve and Iron in the Soul – Turner's adaptation was divided as The Age of Reason (6 episodes), The Reprieve (3 episodes) and The Defeated (4 episodes), thereby placing greater emphasis on the protagonists' pre-war lives in Paris.

Reception was mixed. The series drew several comments over its nude scenes and frank sexual references, including a comic yet highly sympathetic portrayal of a homosexual man. Some doubted if Sartre could or should be adapted for television. Episode 5, first broadcast 1 November 1970, includes what may be the first same-sex female kiss on British television, between Alison Fiske and Consuela Chapman.

== Characters and cast ==
- Mathieu Delarue (Michael Bryant) – an unmarried philosophy professor whose principal wish (like Sartre's) is to remain free
- Daniel (Daniel Massey) – a homosexual friend of both Mathieu and Marcelle
- Marcelle (Rosemary Leach) – Mathieu's pregnant mistress
- Ivich (Alison Fiske) – Boris' sister, to whom Mathieu is attracted
- Boris (Anthony Higgins, listed as Anthony Corlan) – a student of Mathieu
- Brunet (Donald Burton) – Mathieu's Communist friend
- Lola (Georgia Brown) – a fading nightclub chanteuse
- Sarah (Heather Canning) – Gomez's Jewish wife
- Jacques (Clifford Rose) – Mathieu's brother
- Odette (Anna Fox) – Jacques' wife
- Daladier (John Bryans)
- Claude (Colin Baker)
- Pinette (Norman Rossington) – a soldier

== Episodes ==
No.	Episode	Broadcast
1	15 June 1938 – Evening. (The Age of Reason). Paris, 1938: a city known for its ' characters,' a city between the Spanish Civil War and the rise of Hitler. A city where Mathieu lives - and Marcelle exists.	4 October 1970
2	16 June 1938 – Afternoon. (The Age of Reason). Mathieu is trying to arrange an abortion for his mistress Marcelle, and needs money quickly. He takes Ivich to an art exhibition and kisses her for the first time.	11 October 1970
3	16 June 1938 – Evening. (The Age of Reason). Mathieu has not been able to borrow the money he needs. He has arranged to meet Ivich and Boris to hear Lola sing. Daniel visits Marcelle.	18 October 1970
4	17 June 1938 – Morning. (The Age of Reason). Ivich and Mathieu have deliberately cut their hands, thereby achieving a bond. They have arranged to meet at ten o'clock, but before then Mathieu has to give Brunet an answer.	25 October 1970
5	17 June 1938 - Afternoon. (The Age of Reason). Ivich has rejected Mathieu and Boris has left Lola. Daniel has told Marcelle that Mathieu still loves her; however, Mathieu is still trying to borrow the money for an abortion	1 November 1970
6	17 June 1938 – Evening. (The Age of Reason). Ivich has failed her examinations and Mathieu has failed to persuade her to stay in Paris. He has also just stolen money for an abortion and given it to Marcelle.	8 November 1970
7	24 September 1938 – Morning. (The Reprieve). Daniel has proposed to Marcelle and told Mathieu who, because of Daniel's homosexuality, has tried to dissuade Marcelle - but failed. Meanwhile, European events move towards a crisis, and towards Munich.	15 November 1970
8	26 September 1938 – Evening. (The Reprieve). Marcelle and Daniel are married and Lola and Boris reconciled. Mathieu has been staying with Jacques and Odette while Chamberlain and Daladier meet Hitler. Mathieu has been called up.	22 November 1970
9	28 September 1938 - Morning. (The Reprieve). Hitler has made a provocative speech against Czechoslovakia and mobilisation continues. Ivich has returned to Paris and gone to Mathieu's flat to find him leaving to report for army duty.	29 November 1970
10	15 June 1940 - Morning. (The Defeated). The news of the fall of Paris has reached America even though the expected armistice hasn’t yet been signed. Mathieu's unit is waiting in a village to surrender, but Pinette hopes that they will fight.	6 December 1970
11	15 June 1940 – Afternoon. (The Defeated). Boris meets his sister Ivich telling her he wants to escape to Britain to continue the fight. Mathieu's unit has been deserted by their officers and the men are getting drunk whilst awaiting capture. After initially hesitating, Mathieu decides to join them to prove a kinship he does not feel.	13 December 1970
12	16 June 1940 – Afternoon. (The Defeated). In occupied Paris, Daniel dissuades the wayward step-son of a French General from the waters of the Seine, and takes him home hoping for a conquest. Soldiers from Mathieu's unit, frolic with young women from a local village, under the summer sun. As night falls, Mathieu and Pinette choose serviceable rifles, knowing the Germans are advancing.	20 December 1970
13	17 June 1940 – Night. (The Defeated). The remnants of a French Chasseur Regiment have taken over the village determined to make this their last stand. Mathieu and Pinette are the only members of their demoralised unit who join them. The following morning sees contact with the enemy.	27 December 1970

== Theme music ==
The show's theme, La Route est Dure, was sung by Georgia Brown, who also played the part of Lola. Lyrics and music for this song were written by the series' director James Cellan Jones under the pseudonym 'Iago Jones'.

== Awards and nominations ==
The Roads to Freedom was nominated for five BAFTAs (Best Writer, Best Drama Production, Best Actor, Best Actress and Best Design).

In 1971 David Turner won the Writers Guild award for 'Best British Television Dramatization: Jean Paul Sartre's Roads To Freedom (BBC)'.

== Legacy ==
Until 2022, the serial had never received a home media release in any format, although all episodes were retained in the BBC's archives. In 2011, considerable interest was generated by a screening of episodes 7,8 and 9 as part of a BFI season dedicated to director James Cellan Jones. The following year a "rare and complete screening" took place at the BFI Southbank, with all thirteen 45-minute episodes being shown on the 12 & 13 May.

Peter Hitchens recalled watching the original 1970 broadcast in May 2022: "the drama’s subject matter went beyond pure politics to deal with abortion, philosophy, general disillusion, homosexuality, the morality of war and of communism – and the desire for freedom for its own sake. And when the TV version began, I and many others watched with amazement as a national channel gave itself over once a week to such subversion. There was not a taboo it did not break." According to Hitchens, Daniel, the gay character, "was played with great wit and force by Daniel Massey, who nearly stole the whole show from the official star, Michael Bryant."

In July 2022, the series was re-broadcast on BBC Four, and made available on BBC iPlayer. Colin Baker commented: "It was an extraordinary experience to be in an adaptation of a great writer’s work in which all the characters – almost without exception – were flawed, damaged, depressed to the point of self-destruction or in my case just plain bad. The producer David Conroy.. and James Cellan Jones were geniuses at the top of their game. I was very lucky to get such a start in my television career."
