= She Came to Stay =

1943 novel by Simone de Beauvoir

First UK edition (publ. Secker & Warburg, 1949) Cover art by Victor Reinganum

She Came to Stay (French, L'Invitée) is a novel written by French author Simone de Beauvoir first published in 1943. The novel is a fictional account of her and Jean-Paul Sartre's relationship with Olga Kosakiewicz and Wanda Kosakiewicz.

== Plot ==
Set in Paris on the eve of and during World War II, the novel revolves around Françoise, whose open relationship with her partner Pierre becomes strained when they form a ménage à trois with her younger friend Xaviere. The novel explores many existentialist concepts such as freedom, angst, and the other.

== Characters ==
- Françoise – considered to be Simone de Beauvoir
- Pierre – considered to be Jean-Paul Sartre
- Xaviere – considered to be a character combining elements of both Olga and Wanda Kosakiewicz

== See also ==
- The Mandarins
- The Second Sex
