= Daniel Massey (actor) =

English actor and performer (1933–1998)

- Born: Daniel Raymond Massey; 10 October 1933; London, England
- Died: 25 March 1998 (aged 64); London, England
- Occupation: Actor
- Years active: 1953–1998
- Spouses: Adrienne Corri (m. 1961; div. 1967) Penelope Wilton (m. 1975; div. 1984) Linda Wilton (m. 1986)
- Children: 2
- Parent(s): Raymond Massey; Adrianne Allen
- Relatives: Anna Massey (sister); Vincent Massey (uncle); Alice Massey (aunt); Lionel Massey (cousin)

Daniel Raymond Massey (10 October 1933 – 25 March 1998) was an English actor and performer. He is possibly best known for his starring role in the British TV drama The Roads to Freedom, as Daniel, alongside Michael Bryant. He is also known for his role in the 1968 American film Star!, as Noël Coward (Massey's godfather), for which he won a Golden Globe Award and an Oscar nomination.

== Early life ==
Massey was born in London in 1933. He was educated at Eton College and King's College, Cambridge. He was a member of the noted Massey family, which included his father, Raymond Massey, his sister, Anna Massey and his uncle Vincent Massey, the first Canadian-born Governor General of Canada. His mother was the actress Adrianne Allen.

Living with his mother after his parents' divorce, Massey rarely saw his father through most of his adult life. But, they were cast as father and son in The Queen's Guards (1961).

== Career ==
Massey made his film debut as a child in his godfather Noël Coward's naval drama, In Which We Serve (1942). He would later play Coward in the 1968 Julie Andrews vehicle Star!, a performance for which he won a Golden Globe Award and received his sole Academy Award nomination for Best Supporting Actor.

He made a major impression as an adult as Laurence Olivier's son-in-law in the stage and screen versions of John Osborne's The Entertainer (film in 1960). Massey appeared in numerous British films from the 1950s onwards, including The Jokers (1967), Mary, Queen of Scots (1971), The Vault of Horror (1973, in which his character's sister was played by his real-life sister, Anna Massey), The Cat and the Canary (1979), Victory! (1981) and In the Name of the Father (1993).

Other highlights of his career were his stage roles, especially that of the German conductor Wilhelm Furtwängler in Ronald Harwood's Taking Sides; Massey was nominated for the 1996 Olivier Award as Best Actor. He recreated the role for Broadway in 1996, earning a 1997 Drama Desk Award nomination for Outstanding Actor In A Play. His other Broadway stage appearances included musicals such as She Loves Me as Georg in 1963 and Gigi (as Gaston) in 1973.

He appeared in Stephen Sondheim's Follies as Benjamin Stone in the West End in 1987. In the 1980s and 1990s, he also appeared with the Royal Shakespeare Company in productions such as Love's Labour's Lost, Measure for Measure and The Time of Your Life, the latter alongside John Thaw.

In 1970 Massey played the role of the openly gay character Daniel, alongside a cast headed by Michael Bryant as Mathieu in the acclaimed multi-part BBC adaptation of Jean Paul Sartre's The Roads to Freedom.

Other television highlights of Massey's career include The Crucible on the BBC (1981) as Reverend Hale, The Golden Bowl (1972) as the Prince, in the Inspector Morse episode "Deceived by Flight" as Anthony Donn, again with John Thaw, the BBC adaptation of Molly Keane's novel Good Behaviour (1983) as the Major, and his performance as an AIDS patient in Intimate Contact (1987). With Jeremy Brett as Sherlock Holmes, he played a US Senator in "The Problem of Thor Bridge", series 3, episode 2, The Case-Book of Sherlock Holmes, Granada Television, 1991. Brett had once been married to Massey's sister, Anna, and was father to Massey's nephew by Anna, actor David Huggins. He also stole mostly every scene he appeared in the Alan Bleasdale classic G.B.H. (1991) as the awkward eccentric hotel owner, Grosvenor.

== Personal life ==
Massey was married three times, two of his wives being well-known actresses:

- Adrienne Corri (1961–1967)
- Penelope Wilton (1975–1984); one daughter, Alice Massey and a stillborn son
- Linda Wilton (1986–1998) (a sister of Penelope)

Massey also had a close friendship/relationship with Marilu Henner. The two worked together in 1985 in Italy making the film, Love with a Perfect Stranger (1986). Henner wrote she fell for Massey.

== Death ==
He died in London, on 25 March 1998 from Hodgkin's lymphoma, which had been diagnosed in 1992. His body was interred at Putney Vale Cemetery. Massey worked in theatre throughout his cancer treatments, rarely missing a performance.

== Selected filmography ==
- In Which We Serve (1942) – Bobby Kinross
- Girls at Sea (1958) – Flag Lieutenant Courtney
- Operation Bullshine (1959) – Bombardier Peter Palmer
- Upstairs and Downstairs (1959) – Wesley Cotes
- The Entertainer (1960) – Graham
- The Queen's Guards (1961) – John Fellowes
- Go to Blazes (1962) – Harry
- The Amorous Adventures of Moll Flanders (1965) – Elder Brother
- The Jokers (1967) – Riggs
- Star! (1968) – Noël Coward
- Fragment of Fear (1970) – Major Ricketts
- Mary, Queen of Scots (1971) – Robert Dudley
- The Vault of Horror (1973) – Rogers (segment 1 "Midnight Mess")
- The Incredible Sarah (1976) – Victorien Sardou
- The Devil's Advocate (1977) – Black
- Warlords of Atlantis (1978) – Atraxon
- The Cat and the Canary (1978) – Dr. Harry Blythe
- Love with a Perfect Stranger (1986) - Hugo DeLassey
- Bad Timing (1980) – Foppish Man
- Escape to Victory (1981) – Colonel Waldron
- Intimate Contact (1987) - Clive Gregory
- Scandal (1989) – Mervyn Griffith-Jones
- In the Name of the Father (1993) – Prosecutor
- The Miracle Maker (2000) – Cleopas (voice) (final film role)
