= Ivan Baran =

Croatian writer (born 1996)

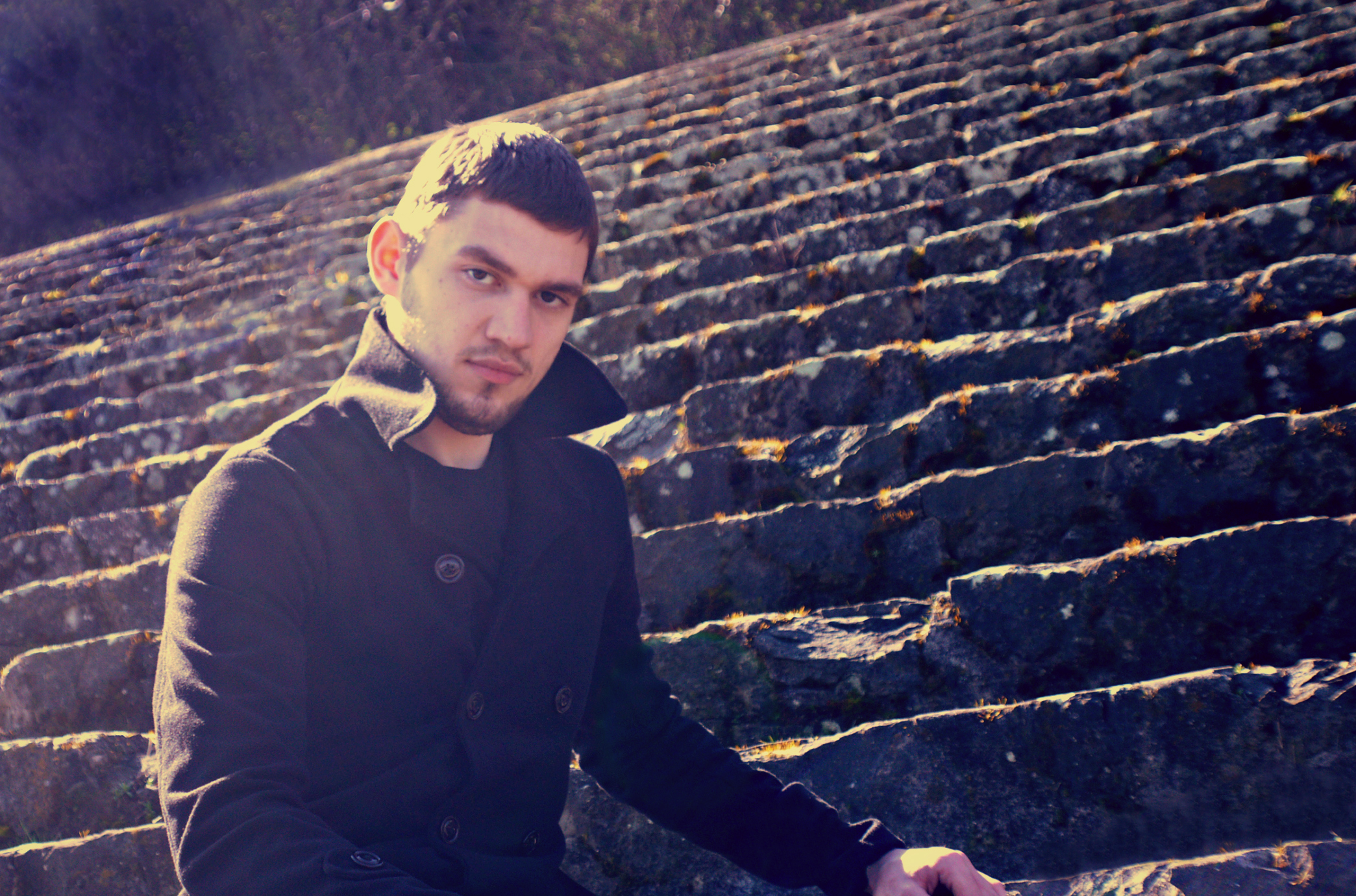
- Baran in 2018
- Born: 16 November 1996 (age 29); Zagreb, Croatia
- Occupations: Novelist, writer
- Writing career
- Period: 2014–present
- Genres: Epic fantasy, philosophical novel
- Notable works: The Black Books Cycle; Samuel Gide; Monsieur August; The Great Fall
- Website: ivanbaran.com

Ivan Baran (born 16 November 1996) is a Croatian writer. He is the author of epic fantasy tetralogy The Black Books Cycle and the philosophical novels Samuel Gide, Monsieur August and The Great Fall. He lives and writes in Vukovar, Croatia.

== Early years ==
Ivan Baran was born on November 16, 1996, in Zagreb. His father was a veteran of Croatian War of Independence, serving in 204th Vukovar Brigade in Battle for Vukovar and was a prisoner of war of Sremska Mitrovica Prison in Serbia. His parents divorced in 1999, after which Baran, along with his two brothers, spent four and a half years in two children's homes, which he left as a 7-year-old. He lived in Vukovar since 2005, together with his father, until the latter passed away.

== Career ==
Baran began writing his debut novel, titled Enzolart, in the summer of 2009, as a twelve-year-old. He finished writing it in 2012, the same year his father died.

As a fifteen-year-old in 2012, Baran edited the book Enzolart and prepared it for publication. In the spring of 2014, Enzolart was published as the book one of the epic fantasy series named The Black Books Cycle (Ciklus Crnih Knjiga).

Book two of The Black Books Cycle, titled Mord Dur'agemski, was published as an e-book in two parts, Mord Dur'agemski, Part One in 2015. and Mord Dur'agemski, Part Two, in 2016.

In 2018. Baran published his first philosophical novel, titled Samuel Gide. Samuel Gide was in the semi-finals of the VBZ competition for the best unpublished novel for the year 2017.

The works Mord Dur'agemski, Part One and Mord Dur'agemski, Part Two were published in print in 2019. That same year, Baran served as the editor of the book Second Derivative (Druga derivacija) by Croatian author Kristijan Mirić.

In 2021, Baran published Darkness of Hil'gum (Tame Hil'guma), book three of The Black Books Cycle, and his second philosophical novel Monsieur August. That same year, he was a subject of the documentary film Good Spirits of Vukovar (Dobri duhovi Vukovara, 2021).

His seventh book, a philosophical novel The Great Fall (Veliki pad) was published in 2024.

In 2025, Baran served as the editor of the book Battle of Vukovar: Three Days in the Hell of War (Bitka za Vukovar: tri dana u paklu rata) by Croatian author Damir Plavšić, a retired Croatian Army captain, and recipient of the Order of Nikola Šubić Zrinski. In 2026, Baran served as the editor of The Whirlwind of Darkness (U vrtlogu tame), a historical fiction novel by Croatian writer Ivana Julius.

Media appearances

In Croatian media, Baran has appeared on major Croatian television networks HRT and NovaTV, as well as local Croatian televisions Plava Vinkovačka, Osječka televizija, Z1 Televizija, Jabuka TV and Televizija Zapad. In print, he gave interviews to major Croatian newspapers 24sata, Jutarnji list and Večernji list, as well as weekly newspaper 7Dnevno. He also appeared in newspapers Glas Slavonije, and gave interviews to Croatian Radio, as well as local radio stations like Hrvatski radio Vukovar, Radio Borovo, and Croatian Catholic Radio, among others.

== Literary influence ==
Among fantasy authors, Baran cited Tolkien, Pullman, Abercrombie, Pratchett, Kay, Williams, Pyle and Paolini as some of his influences. However, he noted that he stopped reading fantasy with the publication of Enzolart, after which he mostly read classics and philosophical books.

Among the authors of classics, he cited Dostoevsky, Tolstoy, Proust and Krleža as his influences, as well as Gide, Beckett and Hesse. Among philosophers who influenced his works, he cited Camus, Nietzsche and Schopenhauer.

Critical reception

In short review of his book Samuel Gide for literary magazine Časopis Kvaka, book critic Klara Capan wrote: "I had the impression that I was reading a classic, and I defined the atmosphere as being closest to reading a book by Oscar Wilde or Süskind's Perfume." Writing a review of Samuel Gide for Centar Kulture, author and book critic Ivan Žganec wrote:

Samuel Gide's plot is relatively simple, but its complexity is evident in the author's attempt to reflect in detail the progressive mental decline. (...) All this happens to an unusual extent: with each subsequent page, the characters seem to exist less and less, which makes the reader not only find himself increasingly distant from them, but at one point he realizes that the characters do not exist, that he is truly alone here and has no one to observe except himself.

In a review of The Black Books Cycle for the news website Press032, book critic and professor Marija Lozančić-Keser offered a nuanced assessment of the series. Regarding Enzolart, she wrote:

Enzolart has a lot of fantasy clichés and, in my opinion, too many characters. Some dialogues are too simple. On the other hand, just when you think you're reading simple fantasy, you come across reflections and depths that you don't expect from a child, and maybe even scare you. Enzolart is fast, light, relaxing as a fantasy, with not too many mistakes.

Reviewing Mord Dur'agemski, she stated:

It surprised me with its style, structure and originality. The writing style reminds me of Tolstoy at times (...) The book could use some more editing, but that doesn't detract from the work as a whole. The story is complex, the descriptions are detailed but not overdone, and the psychology, along with the epic structure, is perhaps the foundation of the entire work."

The Black Books Cycle as a whole Lozančić-Keser described as "intense", adding:

Each character is troubled by something, they are always lost in thought, there is a lot of philosophizing (and even serious philosophy). It's easy to forget that you are reading fantasy, and not some dark book of 19th century realism."

In 2019, an excerpt from Samuel Gide was published in the 14. vukovarski zbornik Matice Hrvatske anthology, published by Matica Hrvatska.

In 2025, A Meaning Anesthetic (Smisaoni anestetik), an excerpt from Baran's unfinished book, was published in the literary magazine Mogućnosti, published by Književni klub Split.

== Multimedia ==
In 2025, following the publication of the second edition of his book Enzolart, Baran released a short film of the same name. Enzolart is a 37-minute-long animated film with narration from the book Enzolart. Its first two screenings were held in Vukovar and Velika Mlaka.

That same year, in collaboration with Croatian video game producer Digital Gods, Baran announced a development of the ARPG video game Enzolart. Early gameplay footage of the video game was screened together with a film Enzolart.

== Private life ==
Baran lives alone, in Vukovar. He stated that he writes for about 6 hours a day.

He is a cosmopolitan and humanist. In some of his interviews, he said to have never tried cigarettes or alcohol, but he does drink coffee. He is an autodidact.

== Bibliography ==
=== The Black Books Cycle (Ciklus Crnih Knjiga; ISBN 9789534869307) ===
- Enzolart (2014, ISBN 9789539911759; 2nd edition: 2025, ISBN 9789534638309)
- Mord Dur'agemski, Part One (as e-book: 2015; print 2019 ISBN 9789539911797)
- Mord Dur'agemski, Part Two (as e-book: 2016; print 2019, ISBN 9789534869314)
- Darkness of Hil'gum (Tame Hil'guma 2021, ISBN 9789534869338)
- Zenith (Vrhunac) (TBA)

=== Standalone books ===
- Samuel Gide (2018, ISBN 9789539911773; 2nd edition: 2022, ISBN 9789534869369)
- Monsieur August (Gospodin August, 2021, ISBN 9789534869345)
- The Great Fall (Veliki pad, 2024, ISBN 9789534869383)

=== As an editor ===
- Mirić, Kristijan – Second Derivative (Druga derivacija, 2019, ISBN 9789539911780)
- Plavšić, Damir – Battle of vukovar: Three Days in the Hell of War (Bitka za Vukovar: tri dana u paklu rata, 2025, ISBN 978-953-46664-1-8)
- Julius, Ivana – The Whirlwind of Darkness (U vrtlogu tame, 2026, ISBN 978-953-46664-4-9)

=== Cited in anthologies ===
- 14. Vukovarski zbornik Matice Hrvatske (Vukovar: Ogranak Matice Hrvatske, 2019)
- Mogućnosti: časopis za književnost, umjetnost i kulturne probleme, godina LXX (Split: Književni krug Split, 2025)

== Film ==
Year	Title	Role	Type	Notes
2021.	Good Spirits of Vukovar (Dobri duhovi Vukovara)	Himself	Documentary	
2025.	Enzolart	Voice	Animated short film	Also producer
