= The Reprieve =

1945 novel by Jean-Paul Sartre

- Cover of the first edition
- Author: Jean-Paul Sartre
- Original title: Le Sursis
- Translator: Eric Sutton
- Language: French
- Series: The Roads to Freedom
- Genre: Philosophical fiction, stream of consciousness
- Publisher: Gallimard, Knopf, Vintage
- Publication date: 1945
- Publication place: France
- English publication date: 1947
- Pages: 464
- ISBN: 0-679-74078-3 (Vintage)
- OCLC: 25026430
- Dewey Decimal: 843/.914 20
- LC Class: PQ2637.A82 S813 1992
- Preceded by: The Age of Reason
- Followed by: Troubled Sleep

The Reprieve (French: Le sursis) is a 1945 novel by French author Jean-Paul Sartre. It was translated by Eric Sutton and was published by Hamish Hamilton in 1947.

It is the second part of the trilogy The Roads to Freedom. It concerns life in France during the eight days before the signing of the Munich Agreement and the subsequent takeover of Czechoslovakia in September 1938.

Sartre explores the reactions of numerous characters to the possibility of war. A mobilization of French troops is called, and those in one classification are to report for duty. Their reluctance or eagerness, their fear and worry, and how, in general, they respond to this change in their lives provide the main substance of the novel.

Instead of following a major character, as he did in the first volume of the trilogy, The Age of Reason, by portraying and focusing on about a dozen men and women, he emphasizes the universality and social nature of events of this type. Many men and women are afraid, not just one.

Big Louis, illiterate, doesn't even know he's to report to duty until he presents his ID at a job site. Charles, an invalid, and all the patients in his hospital, are evacuated but they do not know where. Philippe, a pacifist and the son of a general, rebels and seeks first to flee, and then to become a martyr.

Mathieu Delarue, the main character of the previous volume, is mobilized and has a Stoical response. His friend Gomez, on leave from the Spanish Civil War, is eager to return to Spain, even though he knows the cause is doomed.

All of these characters' activities are intermeshed artistically using avant-garde techniques. Scenes with different characters jump back and forth within the same paragraph. The narrator changes abruptly from third to first person. As T. E. Marshall observed in 1975:

"Some of Sartre's technical devices seem to be deliberately designed to disconcert and confuse the reader, For example, he often uses the pronouns 'il' or 'elle' instead of a character's name, with the result that the reader, at least temporarily, is uncertain to whom the author is alluding, This tends at times to have an irritating and disorientating effect, but it appears to be exactly Sartre's intention. He is eager to ensure that we are obliged to participate actively in the novel, rather than simply observing its action in a dispassionate and passive manner. Sartre wants to disturb and involve the reader. This deliberate ambiguity is an original and skillful means of achieving such an effect. The importance of this particular device goes even further: it allows Sartre to emphasize that the identity of the particular individual he is alluding to is relatively insignificant, because the single dominating factor – the threat of war – exerts its power and influence over every person."

Scenes where character in two different locations are dancing or fighting, are woven together in a manner that works well. The climactic scene near the end where the Western Prime Ministers Chamberlain and Daladier are informing Masaryk and the Czechs that they are being handed over to Hitler, is melded with a scene in which the young woman Ivich is raped.
