= The Age of Reason (novel) =

1945 novel by Jean-Paul Sartre

- Cover of the first edition
- Author: Jean-Paul Sartre
- Original title: L'âge de raison
- Translator: Eric Sutton
- Language: French
- Series: The Roads to Freedom
- Genre: Philosophical fiction
- Publisher: Gallimard, Knopf, Vintage
- Publication date: 1945
- Publication place: France
- English publication date: 1947
- Media type: Print
- Pages: 416
- ISBN: 0-679-73895-9
- OCLC: 25048232
- Dewey Decimal: 843/.914 20
- LC Class: PQ2637.A82 A713 1992
- Followed by: The Reprieve

The Age of Reason (French: L'âge de raison) is a 1945 novel by the philosopher Jean-Paul Sartre. It is the first part of the trilogy The Roads to Freedom.

== Plot ==
The novel, set in the bohemian Paris of 1938, focuses on three days in the life of philosophy teacher Mathieu who is seeking money to pay for an abortion for his mistress, Marcelle. Sartre analyses the motives of various characters and their actions and takes into account the perceptions of others to give the reader a comprehensive picture of the main character.

== Literary themes ==
The Age of Reason is concerned with Sartre's conception of freedom as the ultimate aim of human existence. The work seeks to illustrate the existentialist notion of ultimate freedom through presenting a detailed account of the characters' psychologies as they are forced to make significant decisions in their lives. As the novel progresses, character narratives espouse Sartre's view of what it means to be free and how one operates within the framework of society with this philosophy. The novel is a fictional reprise of some of the main themes in his major philosophical study Being and Nothingness (1943). One of the notions is that ultimately a person's freedom is unassailable as it is fundamentally part of the nothingness that is the imagination and so cannot be taken away or destroyed.

== Critical response ==
The New York Times review stated "There is, indeed, something more in The Age of Reason than an exciting novel and a philosophical problem. As a somber background to Mathieu's private dilemma, Sartre presents a picture of the war in Spain and of the eve of the war in Europe."

The Harvard Crimson published an unattributed review of the book which states "Sartre's new novel is a rare and welcome plant in a period that almost completely lacks a balanced combination of emotional intensity and maturity in its writers." However, the review goes on to remark how Sartre seems to be preoccupied with describing the physical act of vomiting.
