= Julia Lang (actress) =

British actress (1921–2010)

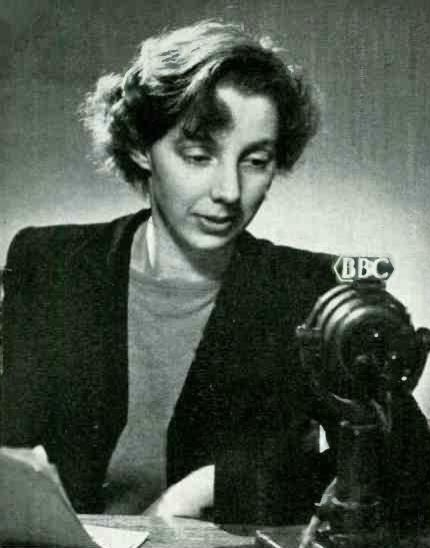
Lang in 1951

Julia Lang (c. 1921 – 1 April 2010) was a British film and radio actress and radio presenter. Born in London, she is best known for presenting the BBC radio programme Listen with Mother.

She married William Shine in 1942. They appeared together in the 1948 film The Red Shoes as "a balletomane" and "a balletomane's mate". Their marriage was dissolved in 1949. She had a son, Stephen.

The phrase "Are you sitting comfortably? Then I'll begin.", universally associated with the show, was coined by Lang as an ad-lib.

In an Anglia Television interview in the 1990s, Lang said that during her tenure of Listen with Mother, when she had finished reading the story, she had to get up (noiselessly), rush across to the piano in the studio and play the concluding music live.

Lang died on 1 April 2010 at the age of 88 in Aldeburgh, Suffolk.

== On-screen appearances ==
=== Film ===
- The Red Shoes (1948) as a Balletomane
- A Date with a Dream (1948) as Madam Docherty
- The Small Back Room (1949) as Danny's Mother (uncredited)
- Stop Press Girl (1949) as Carole Saunders
- Dr. Morelle: The Case of the Missing Heiress (1949) as Miss Frayle
- Under Capricorn (1949) as Susan
- Little Dorrit (1987) as Henry Gowan's mother

=== Television ===
- Coronation Street (episode aired 1977) as Ethel Pratt
- Sad Story of Henry (aired in 1953) as narrator
