= Yvonne Adair =

English teacher and composer (1897–1989)

- Born: Yvonne Madeleine Adair; 18 March 1897; Guernsey
- Died: 17 December 1989 (aged 92); Royal Tunbridge Wells, England
- Other name: Ella Fairall
- Education: Royal Academy of Music
- Occupations: Pianist, music educator, composer

Yvonne Madeleine Adair (18 March 1897 – 17 December 1989) was a British pianist, teacher and composer whose educational compositions still regularly appear in the graded pieces of music college examination boards. Some pieces were published under the pen name Ella Fairall.

== Life ==
Adair was born in Guernsey. Her father was the Wesleyan minister Philip George Adair, and from 1901 she grew up with her family at 2 Vauxhall Street, St Helier, Jersey. She was educated at Kent College, Folkestone and trained at the Royal Academy of Music, where she was a bronze and silver medallist. She taught with the Training School for Music Teachers in London, and privately, specialising in rhythmic and aural training for children. During the war (1916–18) she served in the War Office Intelligence Department. From 1945 she was a music teacher at Sheen Gate House Preparatory School.

Her work includes original vocal, piano and percussion pieces and arrangements for individual learners and ensembles of young players, such as the collections Sketches from Hans Christian Andersen and Little Dog Tales. Between the 1930s and the 1950s Adair published a series of what Christopher Scobie calls "rhythmic, didactic games", an example being 'The Zoo', using "rhythmic durations to represent the footsteps of different animals: crotchets for prowling tigers, quavers for trotting dogs, semiquavers for scurrying mice, and minims for the plodding bears".

She also wrote books on music teaching, including The Percussion Band: A Guide for Teachers (1933), Music Through the Percussion Band (1952, accompanied by a set of four EP records issued by EMI), and contributions to Musical Education: A Symposium (1946, ed. Watkins Shaw).

In the 1930s Adair was living at 117 Westbourne Terrace, London W2. By 1950 she was living at 15, Springfield Road, Wimbledon. Her address was 14 Madeira Park, Tunbridge Wells in 1969, where she died in 1989 at the Halliwell Nursing Home.

== Selected works ==
- Andante and Vivace for percussion band and voices
- La Bourbonnaise. Couperin, arranged for piano solo and percussion band (as Ella Fairall, Chappell 1930)
- Ducks and Drakes: Fifteen Pieces for Percussion Band (Boosey & Hawkes, 1942)
- Empire suite, for voices, piano and percussion band (Hawkes, 1937)
- Folk Tunes From all Nations series
- The Golden Isle, (six descriptive pieces for piano, grade 2–3)
- Handelesques for piano
- Jingle Songs for Percussion Band
- A Little Anthology of Folk Tunes arranged for percussion band (Boosey & Hawkes, 1950)
- A Little Concerto for piano, percussion and voices (1958)
- Little Dog Tales
- Mr Pumphrey: his mood and fancies, Air and 12 variations for percussion band (1935)
- Percussion Band Reading series
- Pussy Velvet: Fifteen pieces for percussion band and piano (1958)
- The Rhythmic Band series
- Ring-a-DingL Sings with Tuned Percussion, Books 1 and 2 (Novello)
- Six Ecossaises', by Beethoven, arranged for percussion band (Hawkes, 1934)
- Sketches from Hans Christian Andersen, piano suite (OUP, 1967)
- Three Preludes for the Left Hand, (Joseph Williams Ltd, 1930)
- Three Stories for or Interpretation through Rhythmic Movement (Winthrop Rogers, 1933)
- Tunes for Children, sets 1-4 (issued with HMV record series Tunes for Children, arranged by Roger Fiske)
