= Roger Fiske =

English musicologist, broadcaster and author (1910–1987)

Roger Fiske (11 September 1910 – 22 July 1987) was a musicologist, broadcaster and author who played an important part in establishing music for schools at the BBC during and after World War II.

Fiske was born in Surbiton. He studied English at Wadham College, Oxford, graduating in 1932 and went on to study composition with Herbert Howells at the Royal College of Music, returning to Oxford for his DMus in 1937.

Joining the BBC in 1939 Fiske organized educational music broadcasts for the forces and for schools. In 1950 the closing music of Listen with Mother (the Berceuse from Fauré's Dolly Suite for piano four hands, which became synonymous with the programme) was performed and recorded by Fiske with Eileen Browne. Fiske stayed on at the BBC until 1959, producing a variety of educational programmes and talks on music for the Third Programme.

From 1968 until 1975 he was editor-in-chief of the Eulenburg miniature score series, taking over from Walter Bergmann. His most ambitious and well-received book was English Theatre Music in the Eighteenth Century, written in 1973. Chamber Music (1969), was written to accompany a BBC radio series produced by Eileen Browne.

Roger Fiske married Elizabeth Sadler in 1939, and there were five children - Catherine, Alison, Veronica, John and Sarah. Alison Fiske (1943–2020) became a successful actress.

During his lifetime Fiske was very modest about his compositional activity. His widow Elizabeth revealed that Frederick Thurston played his 1941 Clarinet Sonata (dedicated to Thurston) at a private performance. There is a modern recording of the Sonata, and of the later Clarinet Sonatina (1951). A collection of his unpublished manuscripts (mostly piano solo, chamber music and songs) is held at the Bodleian Library.

== Books ==
- Beethoven’s Last Quartets (1940)
- Listening to Music (1952)
- The Oxford School Music Books Teacher's Manual series (from 1954)
- Ballet Music (1958)
- Tunes for Children (1959, printed percussion ensemble arrangements and associated His Master's Voice records, with Yvonne Adair)
- Score Reading series (1958–65)
  - 1) Orchestration 2) Musical Form 3) Concertos 4) Oratorios
- Chamber Music (1969)
- Beethoven’s Concertos and Overtures (1970, BBC Music Guide)
- English Theatre Music in the Eighteenth Century (1973, 2nd edition 1986)
- (ed.) Michael Kelly Reminiscences (1975)
- Beethoven's Missa Solemnis (1979, Masterworks of Choral Music Series)
- Scotland in Music (1983)
- (as editor, with Johnston Diack): The Blackwell History of Music in Britain: The Eighteenth Century (1988)

== Compositions ==
- Piano Trio (1935)
- Piano Sonata (1937)
- String Quartet Midsummer Hill (1938) (described on the manuscript score as String Quartet No 4)
- Clarinet Sonata (1941)
- Clarinet Sonatina (1951)
