= Alison Fiske =

English actress (1943–2020)

- Alison Fiske (top left) in Helen: A Woman of Today
- Born: 2 August 1943; Bedford, Bedfordshire, England
- Died: 26 July 2020 (aged 76)
- Education: Royal Central School of Speech and Drama
- Occupation: Actress
- Spouse: Stephen Fagan (m. 1967)
- Children: 2
- Awards: Laurence Olivier Award for Actress of the Year in a New Play (1977)

Alison Mary Fiske (2 August 1943 – 26 July 2020) was an English actress, who won Actress of the Year in a New Play at the 1977 Laurence Olivier Awards for playing Fish in Dusa, Fish, Stats and Vi. She was also nominated in the 1979 Laurence Olivier Awards for Best Actress in a Supporting Role for playing Evie in For Services Rendered, and she won awards for her television performance in Helen: A Woman of Today.

== Early life ==
Fiske was born in Bedford, the daughter of Roger Fiske, a musicologist, and Elizabeth (née Sadler), who had trained as an actress. She was the second of five siblings (Catherine, Veronica, John and Sarah). Fiske began her training with Letty Littlewood at The Associated Arts School in Wimbledon, London for her A-levels, then attended Central School of Speech and Drama in 1963, where she first met her future husband, Stephen Fagan. There was a breakaway group of teachers and students within the Royal Central School, and Fiske and Fagan became founder students of the newly formed Drama Centre.

== Professional career ==
"At Harvard (University), we danced a tarantella on a stage made from rostra with gaps in between. People missed entrances and the set fell down. There were unforgettable moments, such as when we saw Charlie Mingus bashing the lights out in a New York nightclub because he was annoyed with the manager. As a way of seeing America, it was great. As a way to develop as an actor, I’m not so sure."

— Alison Fiske

In 1965, both Fiske and Fagan joined Theatre Group 20, which was formed by an American drama student, Gordon Taylor, and Shivaun O’Casey. They worked out of a church hall in Warwick Avenue, London and began a 4 month tour of American universities, where they performed in The Beggar's Opera and some of Harold Pinter's plays.

Later in New York in an Off-Broadway performance, they were raided by U.S. Immigration officers because they were on the incorrect U.S visas, as a result, they returned to England. Fiske subsequently joined the newly founded Everyman Theatre, Liverpool in Liverpool.

Fiske's television debut was in a Ken Russell project for the television series Monitor (The Debussy Film: Impressions of the French Composer, 1965), co-written by Melvyn Bragg. Debussy was played by Oliver Reed. Her first major television series was The Roads to Freedom (1970), based on a trilogy of novels by Jean-Paul Sartre, in which she played Ivich.

Fiske joined the Royal Shakespeare Company in 1971, where she would perform in productions of The Merchant of Venice, Much Ado About Nothing, Othello, King John, Twelfth Night and Coriolanus. Her last stage role before she retired was in A Man for All Seasons at the Theatre Royal Haymarket in 2006, and her last television role was in the television series Cold Blood, where she played Barbara Wicklow in 2007 and 2008.

== Retirement and death ==
Fiske retired from acting in 2008 with her husband, to live at their home in Barcombe, East Sussex. She died of cancer in 2020.

== Television ==
- The Debussy Film (Monitor, 1965) as Maeterlinck's girlfriend
- The Doctors (1969) as Edna Gilmore
- Kate (1970) as Jane Snow
- Fraud Squad (1970) as Ann Pringle
- The Roads to Freedom (1970) as Ivich
- Paul Temple (1970) as Harriet Parr
- The Frighteners (1972) as Lucille
- Helen: A Woman of Today (1972) as Helen Tully
- For Tea on Sunday (BBC2 Play of the Week, 1978) as Biddy
- 'Tis Pity She's a Whore (1980) as Hippolita
- Lives of Our Own (Screenplay, 1980) as Vivian Cathcart
- For Services Rendered (The ITV Play, 1980) as Eva Ardsley
- Mansfield Park (1983) as Mrs. Price
- David Copperfield (1986) as Rosa Dartle
- Tales of the Unexpected Season 9 (1988) as Betty Sandy
- Stanley and the Women (1991) as Alethea
- Tales from Hollywood (Performance, 1992) as Salka Viertel
- Doctor Finlay (1993) as Margaret Williams
- The Unknown Soldier (1998) as Mrs. Derry
- Midsomer Murders (2001) as Beatrice Chatwyn
- Cold Blood (2007 & 2008) as Barbara Wicklow

== Stage ==
- The Merchant of Venice, Open Air Theatre, London (1969)
- King Stag, Young Vic, London (1970)
- The Merchant of Venice, Royal Shakespeare Theatre, Stratford (1971)
- Much Ado About Nothing, Royal Shakespeare Theatre (1971)
- Othello, Royal Shakespeare Theatre (1971)
- Much Ado About Nothing, Aldwych Theatre, London (1971)
- Much Ado About Nothing, Royal Shakespeare Theatre (1971-1972)
- The Merchant of Venice, Royal Shakespeare Theatre (1971-1972)
- Toad of Toad Hall, Royal Shakespeare Theatre (1972)
- Othello, Royal Shakespeare Touring Company (1972)
- The Merchant of Venice, Royal Shakespeare Theatre (1972)
- The Merchant of Venice, Aldwych Theatre (1972)
- The Lower Depths, Aldwych Theatre (1972)
- Dusa, Fish, Stats and Vi, May Fair Theatre, London (1976-1977)
- In at the Death, Bush Theatre, London (1978)
- For Services Rendered, Grand Theatre, Wolverhampton (1979)
- For Services Rendered, Lyttelton Theatre, London (1979)
- The Cherry Orchard, Harlow Playhouse, Harlow (1982)
- Brighton Beach Memoirs, Lyttelton Theatre (1986)
- The Magistrate, Lyttelton Theatre (1986-1987)
- Les Liaisons Dangereuses, Ambassadors Theatre, London (1986-1987)
- Three Men on a Horse, Cottesloe Theatre, London (1987)
- The Marriage of Figaro, Crucible Theatre, Sheffield, (1988)
- Les Liaisons Dangereuses, Ambassadors Theatre, London (1989)
- When She Danced, Globe Theatre, London (1990-1991)
- Rumours, Theatre Royal, Bath, (1990-1991)
- Pygmalion, Olivier Theatre, London (1992)
- Relative Values, Chichester Festival Theatre, Chichester (1992-1993)
- Donkeys' Years, Theatre Royal, Bath (1992-1993)
- Sweet Bird of Youth, National Theatre, London (1993-1994)
- The Children's Hour, Lyttelton Theatre (1994-1995)
- La Grande Magia, National Theatre (1994-1995)
- The Children's Hour, Theatre Royal, Bath (1994-1995)
- Absolute Hell, Lyttelton Theatre (1995)
- The Learned Ladies, Royal Shakespeare Theatre (1995-1996)
- Three Hours After Marriage, Swan Theatre, Stratford (1996)
- The Learned Ladies, The Other Place, Stratford (1996)
- The Learned Ladies, The Pit, London (1996)
- Three Hours After Marriage, Barbican Theatre, London (1996-1997)
- The Learned Ladies, Barbican Theatre (1996-1997)
- Three Hours After Marriage, The Pit (1997)
- King John, Swan Theatre (2000-2001)
- Twelfth Night, Royal Shakespeare Theatre (2001)
- Robin Hood, Swan Theatre (2001)
- King John, Newcastle Playhouse, Newcastle (2001)
- Twelfth Night, Theatre Royal, Newcastle (2001)
- King John, The Pit (2001-2002)
- Twelfth Night, Barbican Theatre (2002)
- The Merry Wives of Windsor, Swan Theatre (2002-2003)
- Coriolanus, Swan Theatre (2002-2003)
- The Merry Wives of Windsor, Royal Shakespeare Touring Company (2003)
- Coriolanus, Royal Shakespeare Touring Company (2003)
- A Man for All Seasons, Theatre Royal Haymarket, London (2006)
