= Listen with Mother =

BBC children's radio programme (1950–1982)

Listen with Mother is a BBC radio programme for children which ran between 16 January 1950 and 10 September 1982. It was originally produced by Freda Lingstrom although for the majority of its run it was produced by George Dixon, and was presented over the years by Daphne Oxenford, Julia Lang, Eileen Browne, Dorothy Smith and others.

== History ==
It was first broadcast on 16 January 1950 on the BBC Light Programme in a fifteen-minute slot every weekday afternoon at 1.45, just before Woman's Hour. Consisting of stories, songs and nursery rhymes (often sung by Eileen Browne and George Dixon) for "mothers and children at home", it had at its peak an audience of more than a million listeners. Roger Fiske assisted with the music. From 7 September 1964 the programme moved to the BBC Home Service (later BBC Radio 4).

The final week of programmes featured Wriggly Worm stories, presented by Nerys Hughes and Tony Aitken and directed by David Bell. These stories were broadcast on the Listen with Mother throughout the 1970s and early 1980s.

Listening Corner, which replaced Listen with Mother on 13 September 1982, began with repeats of the Wriggly Worm stories. Collections of Listen with Mother stories have been published by Hutchinsons/Random House. Two collections of Wriggly Worm stories ('Wonderful Wriggly Worm' and 'Wonderful Wriggly Worm Rides Again'), by Eugenie Summerfield, have been published by Book Guild. Listening Corner continued until 24 August 1990, ending three days before the launch of BBC Radio 5, which became the new home of children's radio programmes.

== Theme music ==
At the start of each programme a short introduction on piano was played. The tune went to the rhythm of the words quarter to two, which of course was the time of the broadcast, and many children were helped in learning to tell the time by this ingenious device.

A piece for piano duet, the Berceuse from Gabriel Fauré's Dolly Suite, Op. 56, was played at the conclusion of each broadcast and became synonymous with the programme. It was recorded for the programme by Eileen Browne and Roger Fiske, However Julia Lang, in an Anglia Television interview in the 1990s, said that during her tenure when she finished reading the story she had to get up (noiselessly), rush across to the piano in the studio and play the Berceuse live.

== "Are you sitting comfortably?" ==
Each story on Listen with Mother opened with the phrase "Are you sitting comfortably? Then I'll begin" (sometimes "...Then we'll begin"). The question, originally an ad lib by Julia Lang on 16 January 1950, became so well known that it appears in The Oxford Dictionary of Quotations It has been incorporated and sampled by many artists and musicians; for instance,

- in the episode "The Idiot's Lantern", in the revived series of Doctor Who, it was used by the alien presence known as "The Wire" appearing on a television screen and addressing its first victim, the hapless Mr Magpie.
- in the episode "School Reunion", in the revived series of Doctor Who, it was used by the Doctor when he addressed a classroom of students for whom he was substitute teacher.
- in a later episode of Doctor Who, "The Timeless Children", the line was reformulated by The Master as "Are you suffering comfortably? Then I'll begin" on addressing The Doctor in the Matrix.
- as the opening of the narration by Stanley Unwin of the Small Faces' "Happiness Stan" song cycle on Side 2 of their Ogden's Nut Gone Flake album, rendered in Unwin's characteristic style: "Are you all sitting comftybold two-square on your botty? Then I'll begin."
- as the opening line in the film The Others.
- by English actor John Wood in the 1983 film WarGames.
- in the song "It Doesn't Really Matter" by the Canadian band Platinum Blonde on their 1983 Standing in the Dark album.
- as the title, and included in the lyrics of, the Moody Blues song "Are You Sitting Comfortably?" from the 1969 album On the Threshold of a Dream.
- at the beginning of the Slade song "Did Your Mama Ever Tell Ya?", which appeared on the band's 1976 album Nobody's Fools.
- in the band alt-J's song "Hand-Made", from the 2012 album "An Awesome Wave".
- in the opening monologue in the episode "The Narrow Escape Problem" of the TV series Fargo.
- in the soundtrack of PlayStation game Jet Moto 3 at "Shipwreck Cove" arena.
- in the Monty Python sketch "Children's Stories", from Monty Python's Flying Circus season 1, episode 3: "How to Recognise Different Types of Trees from Quite a Long Way Away". Performer Eric Idle opens the sketch with the words: "Hello children, hello. Here is this morning's story. Are you ready? Then, we'll begin". Also in the "Bookshop Sketch" from the Monty Python recording "Contractual Obligations" John Cleese tells the bookstore client he is about to read to "are you sitting comfortably, right!" before reading the client's purchased book, "Ethel The Aardvark Goes Quantity Surveying".
- in the graphic novel V for Vendetta, at the beginning of V monologue "Good evening, London".

== See also ==
- Watch with Mother
- Sandmännchen The West German equivalent to Listen with Mother, which starts with the opening "Nun, liebe Kinder, gebt fein Acht. Ich habe euch etwas mitgebracht" (Now, dear children, pay attention. I have brought you something) in the same way that Listen with Mother started "Are You Sitting Comfortably? Then I'll Begin".
