= Eileen Browne (broadcaster) =

Eileen Browne (5 August 1923 – 14 April 1999) was a BBC Radio broadcaster, perhaps best known for being one of the original presenters of Listen with Mother.

Born in Edinburgh, her parents were Minnie Gallaugher and Professor Francis James Browne, both originally from County Donegal. Eileen studied at the Royal College of Music for 18 months with the piano as her first instrument. After working in precision engineering during the war, she wrote to the BBC asking if there were any vacancies in the schools music department and she was given temporary employment as a junior programme assistant, which later became permanent. During the next seven years her assignments included Music And Movement, Music Box and orchestral concerts. She also wrote the script for a series of on the lives of great composers called Adventures In Music.

As (with George Dixon) one of the two singers on Listen With Mother from its early days she recorded the traditional nursery rhymes, often unaccompanied. She was also responsible for choosing the wide variety of music that opened each programme. The closing music, the Berceuse from Faure's Dolly Suite for piano duet, was recorded by Eileen and Roger Fiske.

She left the BBC in July 1953 shortly after her first marriage, but in 1955, she was the voice of Jenny Woodentop in the BBC's Watch With Mother series. She also worked regularly until 1964 as a part-time producer in schools radio. In 1970 she produced a seven part historical survey of chamber music for BBC Radio 3, presented by Roger Fiske.

In 1956 she married Robert Mitchell. She had a son, daughter and three stepchildren.
