= The Flies =

1943 play by Jean-Paul Sartre

The Flies (French: Les Mouches) is a play by Jean-Paul Sartre, produced in 1943. It is an adaptation of the Electra myth, previously used by the Greek playwrights Sophocles, Aeschylus and Euripides. The play recounts the story of Orestes and his sister Electra in their quest to avenge the death of their father Agamemnon, king of Argos, by killing their mother Clytemnestra and her husband Aegisthus, who had deposed and killed him.

Sartre incorporates an existentialist theme into the play, having Electra and Orestes engaged in a battle with Zeus and his Furies, who are the gods of Argos and the centerpiece for self-abnegating religious rituals. This results in fear and a lack of autonomy for Zeus's worshippers, who live in constant shame of their humanity.

== Synopsis ==
=== Act 1 ===
Orestes first arrives as a traveler with his tutor/slave, and does not seek involvement. Orestes has been traveling in a quest to find himself. He enters the story more as an adolescent with a girlish face, one who does not know his path or responsibility. He enters the city and introduces himself as Philebus ("lover of youth"), to disguise his true identity. Zeus has followed Orestes on his journey, and finally approaches him in Argos, introducing himself as Demetrios ("devoted to Demeter", a goddess who was in fact Zeus' own sister). Orestes has come on the eve of the day of the dead, a day of mourning to commemorate the killing of Agamemnon fifteen years prior. No townsperson aside from an aphasic "idiot boy" will speak to Orestes or his tutor because they are strangers and not mourning, remorseful or dressed in all black. Orestes meets his sister, Electra, and sees the terrible state that both she and the city are in. Electra has been treated as a servant girl since her mother and Aegisthus killed her father. She longs to exact her revenge and refuses to mourn for the sins and death of Agamemnon or of the townspeople.

=== Act 2 ===
Orestes goes to the ceremony of the dead, where the angry souls are released by Aegisthus for one day where they are allowed out to roam the town and torment those who have wronged them. The townspeople have to welcome the souls by setting a place at their tables and welcoming them into their beds. The townspeople have seen their purpose in life as constantly mourning and being remorseful of their "sins". Electra, late to the ceremony, dances on top the cave in a white gown to symbolize her youth and innocence. She dances and yells to announce her freedom and denounce the expectation to mourn for deaths not her own. The townspeople begin to believe and think of freedom until Zeus sends a contrary sign to deter them, and to deter Orestes from confronting the present King.

Orestes and Electra unite and eventually resolve to kill Aegisthus and Clytemnestra. Zeus visits Aegisthus to tell him of Orestes's plan and convince him to stop it. Here Zeus reveals two secrets of the gods: 1) people are free and 2) once they are free and realize it, the gods cannot touch them. It then becomes a matter between men. The ceremony of the dead and its fable has enabled Aegisthus to keep control and order over the town, instilled fear among them. Aegisthus refuses to fight back when Orestes and Electra confront him. Orestes kills Aegisthus and then he alone goes to Clytemnestra's bed chamber and kills her as well.

=== Act 3 ===
Orestes and Electra flee to the temple of Apollo to escape men and the flies. At the temple, the furies wait for Orestes and Electra to leave the sanctuary so the furies can attack and torture them. Electra fears her brother and begins to try to avoid her responsibility for the murders. She attempts to evade guilt and remorse by claiming she had only dreamt of murder for 15 years, as a form of release, while Orestes is the actual murderer. Orestes tries to keep her from listening to the Furies - which are convincing her to repent and accept punishment.

Zeus attempts to convince Orestes to atone for his crime, but Orestes says he cannot atone for something that is not a crime. Zeus tells Electra he has come to save them and will gladly forgive and give the throne to the siblings, if they repent. Orestes refuses the throne and belongings of the man he killed. Orestes feels he has saved the city by removing the veil from their eyes and exposing them to freedom. Zeus says the townspeople hate him and are waiting to kill him; he is alone. The scene at the temple of Apollo represents a decision between God's law and self-law (autonomy). Zeus points out that Orestes is foreign even to himself. Sartre demonstrates Orestes' authenticity by stating that, since his past does not determine his future, Orestes has no set identity: he freely creates his identity anew at every moment. He can never know who he is with certainty because his identity changes from moment to moment.

Orestes still refuses to repudiate his actions. In response, Zeus tells Orestes of how he himself has ordered the universe and nature based on Goodness, and by rejecting this Goodness, Orestes has rejected the universe itself. Orestes accepts his exile from nature and from the rest of humanity. Orestes argues Zeus is not the king of man and blundered when he gave them freedom - at that point they ceased to be under god's power. Orestes announces he will free the townspeople from their remorse and take on all their guilt and "sin" (author makes reference to Jesus Christ). Here Orestes somewhat illustrates Nietzsche's overman by showing the townspeople his power to overcome pity. Electra chases after Zeus and promises him her repentance.

When Electra repudiates her crime, Orestes says that she is bringing guilt on herself. Guilt results from the failure to accept responsibility for one's actions as a product of one's freedom. To repudiate one's actions is to agree that it was wrong to take those actions in the first place. In doing this, Electra repudiates her ability to freely choose her own values (to Sartre, an act of bad faith). Instead, she accepts the values that Zeus imposes on her. In repudiating the murders of Clytemnestra and Aegisthus, Electra allows Zeus to determine her past for her. She surrenders her freedom by letting her past take on a meaning that she did not give to it by herself, and as a result she becomes bound to a meaning that did not come from her. Electra can choose, like Orestes, to see the murders as right and therefore to reject feelings of guilt. Instead, she allows Zeus to tell her that the murders were wrong and to implicate her in a crime.

The Furies decide to leave her alone in order to wait for Orestes to weaken so they can attack him. The Tutor enters but the Furies will not let him through. Orestes orders him to open the door so that he may address his people. Orestes informs them he has taken their crimes upon himself and that they must learn to build a new life for themselves without remorse. He wishes to be a king without a kingdom, and promises to leave, taking their sins, their dead, and their flies with him. Telling the story of the pied piper, Orestes walks off into the light as the Furies chase after him.

== Characters ==
Zeus (Greek) / Jupiter (Roman) – a major antagonist in the play, Zeus is introduced in the exposition as "god of flies and death", although he is traditionally associated with sky, lightning, thunder, law, order, and justice.

Orestes (Philebus) – the play's major protagonist, he is the brother of Electra and the son of Agamemnon.

Electra – the sister of Orestes and the daughter of Agamemnon.

Agamemnon – the former king of Argos and the father of Orestes and Electra, Agamemnon was murdered by Aegisthus prior to the story's onset. Orestes' desire to avenge his father's death is a major plot device in the play.

Clytemnestra – the wife of Aegisthus and the mother of Orestes and Electra.

Aegisthus – the husband of Clytemnestra.

Furies – also known as the Erinyes or "infernal goddesses", the Furies serve as Zeus' enforcers in Argos and punish those who swear false oaths.

== Background ==
In 1941, Sartre and Simone de Beauvoir attended performances of a production of The Suppliant Maidens, in which Olga Kosakiewicz had a part.

"It was during this production of The Suppliant Maidens that Sartre conceived the idea of writing a play himself. Both Olgas [i.e. Olga Kosakiewicz and another woman named Olga] had parts in it . . . . During rehearsals they asked [the play's producer-director Jean-Louis Barrault] how to go about getting a really first-rate part. 'The best way,' he replied, 'would be to get someone to write a play for you.' And Sartre thought: 'Why shouldn't I be the one?' He had written and produced a play in the Stalag, called Bariona: ostensibly the theme of this 'mystery play' was the birth of Christ, but in fact the drama centered on the Roman occupation of Palestine, and his fellow prisoners were quick to take the allusion. What they applauded on Christmas Eve was Resistance propaganda. The real function of the theater, Sartre thought at the time, is to appeal to those who share a common predicament with the playwright. This 'common predicament' was one that faced Frenchmen everywhere, assailed daily as they were by German and Vichy propaganda exhorting them to repent and submit; the theater might provide a medium through which to remind them of rebellion and freedom. He began to cast around for a plot that would be at once technically unobjectionable and transparent and its implications."

Years later, Sartre stated: "The real drama, the drama I should have liked to write, was that of the terrorist who, by ambushing Germans, becomes the instrument for the execution of fifty hostages." Noted Sartre biographer Annie Cohen-Solal views this statement as an allusion to a series of events that occurred in occupied Paris in 1941: a German officer was killed at the Métro Barbès and in retaliation the German military forces executed eight prisoners in September and then 98 prisoners in October. However, the German censors would have banned such a play, so Sartre was forced to look for other subjects. He settled on the idea of using the story of the Atridae as a vehicle. De Beauvoir says that the first act was inspired by the town of Emborio, "the village on Santorin which had presented so sinister at atmosphere to us when we first reached it [during a holiday] -- all those blank, shuttered houses under the blazing noonday sun." She also says that she, after reading a book about the Etruscans, informed Sartre about the Etruscans' funeral ceremonies, and he found inspiration in this for the second act.

== Sartre's philosophy ==
One scholar has explained the relationship between The Flies and Sartre's philosophy thus:

"The play explores the key existentialist themes of freedom and responsibility through the radical conversion of Philebus the peace loving intellectual into Orestes the warrior. A person may not be prepared for present crises by his past experiences, but it is nonetheless bad faith for him to declare, 'I was not meant for this' or 'This should not be happening to me.' Orestes resists bad faith and achieves authenticity by rising to the demands of his circumstances and fully realizing his being-in-situation."

Sartre's idea of freedom specifically requires that the being-for-itself be neither a being-for-others nor a being-in-itself. A being-for-others occurs when human beings accept morals thrust onto them by others. A being-in-itself occurs when human beings do not separate themselves from objects of nature. Zeus represents both a moral norm, the Good, and Nature. Freedom is not the ability to physically do whatever one wants. It is the ability to mentally interpret one's own life for oneself—to define oneself and create one's own values. Even the slave can interpret his or her life in different ways, and in this sense the slave is free.

The Flies also shows the effect of Nietzsche on Sartre. Orestes represents the idea of the overman, as described in works such as Thus Spoke Zarathustra; the ability to free one's mind from dogma and the impressions of others, and instead think on a higher level. Like Zarathustra, Orestes feels he must "go down" to the people and open their eyes (though unlike Zarathustra, Orestes does it out of compassion). When debating Zeus, Orestes also talks about being "beyond" the moral yoke others allow to be placed on them - an idea explicitly discussed in Beyond Good and Evil, and implicitly described in other works by Nietzsche. Orestes is not bound by the false dichotomy of "good" and "evil," and instead accepts what has been done, choosing to focus on the present and the future.

Sartre continued a twentieth-century tradition of an incestuous flirtation between Électre and Oreste in Les Mouches. This flirtation may have been inspired by the incestuous siblings of Andre Gide’s Œdipe, and philosophically motivated by Gide and Sartre’s shared antipathy to Freud’s repression theory.

== Production history ==
The Flies was first produced in Paris on 3 June 1943. The production ran at the Théâtre de la Cité. Sartre had to get German censors to approve the play, because Paris was occupied by the German army. A sculptor was employed to create "great blocks of stone", as well as settings, masks, and statues; large numbers of extras were also used. During one of the rehearsals, a young man came up to Sartre and introduced himself; it turned out to be Albert Camus. The production was poorly attended and got a lukewarm reception from critics. Simone de Beauvoir's assessment of the play's effectiveness and reception was as follows: "It was impossible to mistake the play's implications; the word Liberty, dropped from Orestes' mouth, burst on us like a bomb. The German critic of Pariser Zeitung saw this very clearly, and said so, though at the same time taking the credit for giving the play a favorable notice. Michel Leiris praised The Flies in a clandestine edition of Les Lettres francaises, and emphasized its political significance. Most reviewers pretended not to have noticed any such allusion; they pitched into the play viciously, but, so they alleged, on purely literary grounds . . . "

After a first smaller US production at Vassar College early in April 1947, the play received its New York City debut at the President Theatre on April 16, 1947. It was directed by the head of the Dramatic Workshop, German expatriate stage director Erwin Piscator. The New York Times' critic Lester Bernstein reacted favorably to the play and its production:

The Dramatic Workshop's skillful production takes this dramatic history of the play into full account by employing several theatrically effective devices, including a newsreel curtain-raiser depicting the Nazi heyday.

== Compared to the Oresteia ==
The Flies is also a modern take on Aeschylus’ trilogy, the Oresteia. While Sartre keeps many aspects of the original story by Aeschylus, he adjusts the play to fit his views, with strong themes of freedom from psychological slavery. He focuses most on the second play in the Oresteia trilogy, only referencing the first play, Agamemnon, with the mention of Agamemnon’s death by Clytemnestra and Aegisthus. The plot of the third play, The Eumenides is also excluded because in that play, the Council of Elders absolves Orestes of his sins, but since Sartre depicts Orestes as remorseless, he cannot include that storyline in his play without having to change his storyline. Unlike in Aeschylus’ The Libation Bearers, where revenge is one of the main themes throughout the play, Sartre’s Orestes does not kill Aegisthus and Clytemnestra for vengeance or because it was his destiny, instead it is for the sake of the people of Argos, so that they may be freed from their enslavement. Sartre wants to stress the fact that Orestes comes to that decision by himself, without the aid or direction of any outside forces, which contrasts with the Orestes in The Libation Bearers, who relies heavily on the direction of the gods. Sartre even diminishes the character of Clytemnestra so that there is much less emphasis on matricide than there is in the version by Aeschylus. While Electra is guilt-stricken after the death of Clytemnestra, Orestes feels no remorse for killing his mother, so his relationship with her is not very important. Sartre’s representation of the Furies differs from that of Aeschylus in that, instead of attempting to avenge the crimes committed, they try to evoke guilt from those who committed them. Sartre does this to reiterate the importance of amenability; he wants to prove that remorse should only be felt if one believes the act committed is wrong. By acting in what he believes to be a righteous way and killing the king and queen, Orestes takes responsibility for his actions without feeling any remorse for them.

== Adaptations ==
- La Tragedie d'Oreste et Electre: Album by British band The Cranes (band).

== Sources ==
- TeacherWeb. 'No Exit' and three other plays by Jen-Paul Sartre (full text):

No Exit (Huis Clos)
The Flies (Les Mouches)
Dirty Hands (Les Mains sales)
The Respectful Prostitute (La Putain respectueuse).
