= The Roads to Freedom =

Novel series by Jean-Paul Sartre

The Roads to Freedom (French: Les chemins de la liberté) is a series of novels by French author Jean-Paul Sartre. Intended as a tetralogy, it was left incomplete, with only three complete volumes and part one of the fourth volume of the planned four volumes published in his lifetime and the unfinished second part of the fourth volume was edited and published a year after his death.

The three published novels revolve around Mathieu, a socialist teacher of philosophy, and a group of his friends. The trilogy includes: L'âge de raison (The Age of Reason), Le sursis (which is generally translated as The Reprieve but could cover a number of semantic fields from 'deferment' to 'amnesty'), and La mort dans l'âme (Troubled Sleep, originally translated by Gerard Hopkins as Iron in the Soul, Hamish Hamilton, 1950). The trilogy was to be followed by a fourth novel, La dernière chance (i.e. The Last Chance); however, Sartre would never finish it: two chapters were published in 1949 in Sartre's magazine Les Temps modernes under the title Drôle d'amitié. The last part of The Last Chance was later reconstructed and published in 1981 (see section below).

The novels were written largely in response to the events of World War II and the Nazi occupation of France, and express certain significant shifts in Sartre's philosophical position towards 'engagement' (commitment) in both life and literature, finding their resolution in the extended essay L'existentialisme est un humanisme (Existentialism is a Form of Humanism).

== Background ==
Sartre's Paris on the Eve of War – "Gaiety...Cafes". An engraving by Iain McNab. (Published in The New York Times in the book review of The Age of Reason, July 13, 1947)

In April 1938, Sartre's first novel Nausea was published. Three months later, in July, he wrote to Simone de Beauvoir: "I have all at once found the subject of my [next] novel, its proportions and its title... The subject is freedom." Originally it was to be titled "Lucifer", and written in two parts – "La Revolte" and "Le Serment" (The Oath). In the autumn of 1938, Sartre began writing the novel that was to become The Age of Reason, and continued working on the novel on and off for the next year. In early September 1939, he was called up into the French Army and was assigned to the meteorological unit. Except for some regular meteorological observations, this war work was not exacting, and he had plenty of time to work on his novel, his war diaries, and numerous letters to friends. At one point he produced seventy-three pages of the novel in thirteen days. He had completed the novel by December 31, 1939, and immediately started a sequel, which he originally wanted to call September (referring to the Munich Agreement of September 1938), and which became titled The Reprieve. He finished writing The Reprieve in November 1943. However, he was constantly editing the manuscripts, and also turned them over to Simone de Beauvoir for critique.

His writing in these novels was semi-autobiographical. His separation from his accustomed life in Paris and the leisure and structure of his war work led him to continued introspection during this period. Mathieu was based upon himself, Ivich was based on Olga Kosakiewicz (a student of Simone de Beauvoir and friend of Sartre), Gomez was based on Fernando Gerassi, Sarah on Stephania Avdykovych (both very close friends of Sartre and de Beauvoir), and Boris was based on Sartre's friend Jacques-Laurent Bost. Marcelle, perhaps loosely based on Simone de Beauvoir, was the character most removed from the real-life model.

The Age of Reason and The Reprieve were published together after the war in September 1945. "Sartre was by now France's leading intellectual voice, and the novels, not least because they defined a critical period in French history, were received with great enthusiasm by the French public." However, some reviews were mixed. Louis Parrot writing for Les Lettres francaises said, "Jean-Paul Sartre has definitely taken his place among the greatest French writers of our day... His powerful talent has affirmed itself with rare brilliance." Gaéton Picon writing for Confluences said, "If Sartre's ambition was to force the doors of literary history, he has succeeded.. Like all great novelists, he also enjoys the privilege of having a universe of his own." However, Louis Beirnart, writing for Etudes, said, "If books could smell, one would have to hold one's nose in front of Sartre's latest books... Sartre's objective is, very clearly, to show life through its excrement and lower the value of existence to the level of the gutter and the dump." Orville Prescott in The New York Times, disliked the work, writing "as a creative work of fiction 'The Age of Reason' is a tedious disappointment. Its possible significance as 'existentialist fiction is pitifully meager, too", as well as criticizing Sartre's portrayal of the characters for being both uninteresting and unbelievable.

Extracts of the third novel in the trilogy, Iron in the Soul (or Troubled Sleep), appeared in the journal Les Temps Modernes in January and June 1949, and it was published in book form later that year. The reviews were not good. As for the reception, Sartre scholar Michel Contat says: Troubled Sleep "failed to provoke the anticipated and promised positive responses, as critics transferred their moral disappointment into an accusation that [Troubled Sleep] represented an exhaustion of Sartre's literary creativity. Although Sartre always said that he accorded no importance to the judgments of literary reviewers, his partial failure in their eyes intimidated him in the face of the fourth volume..." Consequently, Sartre was unable to complete the series.

== Characters ==
- Mathieu Delarue – an unmarried philosophy professor whose principal wish (like Sartre's) is to remain free
- Marcelle – Mathieu's pregnant mistress
- Daniel – a homosexual friend of both Mathieu and Marcelle
- Boris – a student of Mathieu
- Ivich – Boris' sister, to whom Mathieu is attracted
- Brunet – Mathieu's Communist friend
- Gomez – a painter, who is fighting with the Republicans in Spain
- Sarah – Gomez's Jewish wife

== Overview of the series ==
"The first novel, L'âge de raison (1945; The Age of Reason), centers on philosophy professor Mathieu Delarue's uncertainty over whether to devote himself to his pregnant mistress or to his political party. The second volume, Le sursis (1945, The Reprieve), explores the ramifications of the appeasement pact that Great Britain and France signed with Nazi Germany in 1938. In the third book, La mort dans l'âme (1949; Troubled Sleep, published in Great Britain as Iron in the Soul), Delarue ends his indecisiveness by attempting to defend a village under attack from the Germans. Although he is apparently killed, Delarue expresses his ultimate freedom through his bravery."

The second part of Troubled Sleep focuses on Mathieu's communist friend Brunet in the POW camp. Drôle d'amitié (Strange Friendship) also focuses on Brunet, and his fellow prisoner Schneider, in the POW camp. In the final part, La dernière chance (The Last Chance), it is revealed that Mathieu was in fact not previously killed: he reappears in a stalag after two months in the hospital.

== Shifting viewpoints within the novels ==
In L'âge de raison, "the perspective changes from chapter to chapter throughout the account of a 48-hour period. In volume 2, Le Sursis, the time-span is a week, but the viewpoint shifts more rapidly, moving sometimes within a single phrase from one character's perspective to another's... The lack of punctuation, the juxtaposition of perspectives, and the intensity created by the single focus of a multiplicity of characters work together to convey the common humanity and intersubjective experience of the French on the verge of war... Volume 3, La mort dans l'âme, reverts to a slower pace of perspectival change."

As for the experimental style of The Reprieve, Sartre wrote in 1945:

"I tried to take advantage of the experiments in technique that certain writers of simultaneity, like Dos Passos and Virginia Woolf, have undertaken. I took up their question at the very point where they had let it lie, and I tried to uncover something new along this path. The reader will say whether or not I've succeeded."

Of the first two books in the series, Sartre once said:

"My intention was to write a novel about freedom. I wanted to retrace the path followed by some people and social groups between 1938 and 1944... I decided to tell The Age of Reason in an ordinary way, by simply showing the structured relationships that link a few individuals. But then come the days of September 1938, and all the barriers collapse... In The Reprieve we'll find again all the characters of The Age of Reason, but now they are lost in a crowd."

== Interpretation ==
Overall, "the Roads to Freedom as a trilogy reflects many of Sartre's best-known existentialist concepts, including bad faith, or self-deception, the acknowledgment of freedom that comes with both anguish and personal responsibility for one's actions, and how those actions embody the personal and social morality that one promotes."

In his book Sartre and Fiction, Gary Cox discusses the implications of the Roads to Freedom series:

The Age of Reason... grew alongside Being and Nothingness for several years and echoes many of its central themes, particularly the themes of freedom, responsibility and being-for-others...

It was not to the war that Sartre turned for inspiration for the first volume of his trilogy, but to prewar Paris of the summer of 1938.... The Age of Reason is not nostalgic about the years between the wars. Rather it casts a detached and objective eye on a group of largely pathetic, emotionally immature characters who are too self-absorbed to really notice or care about the gathering clouds of war that will soon change their narrow little lives beyond recognition. With the coming of war Sartre began to change from a thinker preoccupied with the personal into a very political animal....

The Reprieve was written while the Germans occupied Paris ... It covers the eight days from 23 to 30 September leading up to the controversial Munich Agreement... With The Reprieve politics and history enter the trilogy with a vengeance, although events are not unfolded in the form of an abstract historical account but via myriad personal perspectives.

Iron in the Soul (a.k.a. Troubled Sleep) is set in June 1940, 21 months after the events of The Reprieve. The central historical theme of the novel is the defeat of France by the Germans, and certainly a major source of inspiration for the novel was Sartre's capture and imprisonment by German forces in June 1940.... Mathieu makes a brief fifteen-minute stand against the Nazis ... that is all but futile in military terms, but for him it is an uncompromising and decisive act that is the ultimate affirmation of his freedom ... Here Mathieu achieves authenticity...

The final 120 pages of the novel shift the focus to the communist Brunet in the POW camp. Brunet sees the game of French captives and German captors as another symptom of the evils of capitalism and nationalism, evils that will continue when this particular war is over unless ordinary people of whatever nationality can win the class struggle.

== The unfinished fourth volume, The Last Chance ==
In 1981 a text of La dernière chance was published in French with Sartre's complete works of fiction in the Pléiade edition. George H. Bauer and Michel Contat had painstakingly reconstructed the intended novel from Sartre's "completely unorganized manuscript pages." In their "Critical Note on The Last Chance," the authors note: "Let us also add that Sartre had come to be aware of the work we were doing on his drafts, and that he allowed it."

In 2009, Craig Vasey translated and published this work into English. Vasey's edition, titled The Last Chance: Roads of Freedom IV, includes two parts: 1) Strange Friendship (Drôle d'amitié) – the two chapters which were previously published in 1949 in Sartre's magazine Les Temps modernes; and 2) The Last Chance (La dernière chance) – the text reconstructed by Bauer and Contat from Sartre's notes. This is the first time that these two parts have been available in English.

== Why Sartre did not finish the series ==
Sartre's biographer Ronald Hayman theorized that one reason Sartre did not finish the Roads to Freedom series was that Sartre "deeply disliked bringing anything to a conclusion." Hayman pointed out that although Sartre "managed to complete nine original plays, seven short stories, and several screenplays, nearly all his other major projects in literature and philosophy were abandoned." These included the planned sequels to Nausea, Being and Nothingness, and Critique of Dialectical Reason, and "other uncompleted projects including the autobiography, the enormous biography of Flaubert, La Psyché (a phenomenological psychology), a book on Mallarmé, one on Tintoretto," etc. As for the Roads to Liberty, Sartre "had relatively little difficulty in completing the first three volumes: nothing needed to be concluded. He wrote 223 pages of the last volume, La derniere chance, and he did not give up hope of finishing it until nine years after publishing the third volume in the series."

According to Hayman, one reason for Sartre's unfinished projects was his restlessness: when Sartre "worked at long-term projects, it was tarnished by ambivalence. Other work would be clamoring for his time, and simultaneously he would feel guilty about enjoying words instead of taking action." Simone de Beauvoir is quoted as saying, "Without having abandoned the idea of a fourth volume, he always found work that needed his attention more."

For another possible interpretation, Hayman goes on to quote the writer Michael Scriven, who said that Sartre was "shattering the myth of the coherently finished text, the myth that the contradictions that gave rise to the work have been resolved by an apparently cohesive textual narrative."

Michel Contat, in his "General Introduction for Roads of Freedom," points out that Sartre was no longer in the right frame of mind. His experience had become "extremely restricted and particularized. It became the experience of a man of letters, a celebrity intellectual, who, apart from his old circle of friends, almost only encounters people like himself, even when he goes abroad." Also, the reviews of the last novel in the series, Troubled Sleep, had not been good. Contat further suggests that "it is in developing the idea, near the end of 1953, of an autobiography that Sartre decides – or rather that the decision takes place in him – to leave his novel where it is, for this new project represents a way out of the dead-end in which he finds himself with the novel."

In an interview in 1973 concerning The Roads to Freedom, Sartre revealed at least one of the reasons he discontinued the series:

What is fundamentally false about a novel in which one constructs a character based on oneself is precisely that he is not really you. The differences you put into him, and which seem of no decisive significance at the outset, end up throwing him into falseness. In The Age of Reason, I gave Mathieu everything of mine—I don't mean the facts of life, but his character—except the essential thing, which is that I lived in order to write. There is something radically false in an autobiographical novel, namely that it's straddling: it is neither completely a novel, nor completely an autobiography. But that's something I did not want to see at the time because I did not want to abandon the novel, and I could not write without making use of my own life.

== Adaptation ==
The novel series was adapted into a thirteen-part television serial by David Turner for BBC Television in 1970, with Michael Bryant as Mathieu and directed by James Cellan Jones. The adaptation was nominated for several BAFTA awards for 1970. The entire series was screened by the British Film Institute over the weekend of 12–13 May 2012, attended by the director and several surviving cast members. The series had not been broadcast on television since 1977, and is unavailable on any format. In 2022, it was finally announced it would be repeated on BBC4.
