= Olga Kosakiewicz =

French actress (1915–1983)

Olga Kosakiewicz (Ukrainian: Ольга Козакевич; 6 November 1915 – 1983) was a French theater actress.

== Biography ==
She and her sister Wanda Kosakiewicz were born in Kyiv as daughters of the Frenchwoman Marthe Kosakiewicz and the Belarusian emigrant from Kyiv Victor Kosakiewicz. After the October Revolution, the family migrated to L'Aigle, where the father acquired and operated a saw mill.

Olga Kosakiewicz attended the Lycée Joan of Arc in Rouen, where she was taught by Colette Audry, and in 1932 introduced to Simone de Beauvoir. In 1934, when Jean-Paul Sartre returned from a study visit from the German Reich, she was also introduced to him. At the end of the school year 1934 she passed her Baccalauréat. From autumn 1934 to 1936 she studied medicine at the University of Rouen, then lived in Paris. From 1934 to 1935 Beauvoir and from 1935 to 1937 Sartre had an affair with her. Her irrepressible, rebellious character, characterized by emotional high and low, her authenticity and spontaneity charmed Sartre and Beauvoir.

She joined the circle of de Beauvoir and Jean-Paul Sartre. In de Beauvoir's first novel L'Invitée, she and her sister, Wanda, were fused together to make the character of the younger friend Xavière, to form with the actress Françoise and the actor, director Pierre a ménage à trois.

Olga, along with Bianca Lamblin and Natalie Sorokin, later stated that their "trio" relationships with Sartre and de Beauvoir damaged them psychologically.

A motivation of Sartre to write the play The Flies was to give Kosakiewicz an opportunity for a debut as a theater actress. The Flies should have premiered at the Comédie-Française, but the intendant Jean-Louis Barrault did not agree to Sartre's condition that Olga Kosakiewicz should assume the role of Electra. So it was premiered on 3 June 1943 at the Théâtre de la Cité internationale (aka Théâtre Sarah Bernhardt).

In 1946 in Simone de Beauvoir's unique Drama Les Bouches inutiles she played Clarice the daughter of Catherine and Louis d'Avesnes the main characters.

In Sartre's trilogy of novels, Les Chemins de la Liberté (The Roads to Freedom), the character of Ivich is considered a representation of Olga. Deirdre Bair's biography of Simone de Beauvoir examines this relationship. Hazel Rowley also discusses it at length in her book about the relationship between Simone de Beauvoir and Jean-Paul Sartre.

In 1946 Olga married Jacques-Laurent Bost, a long-time lover of de Beauvoir. She died of tuberculosis in 1983.

== See also ==
- Bianca Lamblin
- Natalie Sorokin
