= In at the Death =

In At The Death was a sketch revue performed at The Bush Theatre, London in 1978, most notable for being the first time that future colleagues Victoria Wood and Julie Walters would work together.

The show is described in Neil Brandwood's biography of Wood as an "alternative theatre company's sketch show about mortality."

After being impressed by Wood's songwriting skills, director Dusty Hughes invited her to be part of a six strong writing team, the topicality of the review was also deemed suitable for her as she'd just finished writing weekly topical songs on the BBC1 consumer show That's Life!.

Other writers included were Ken Campbell, Snoo Wilson, Ken Hutchinson and Nigel Baldwin. They were asked to write short items based on the week's newspapers around the theme of death. Campbell took stories from the Malaysian New Straits Times, Baldwin the Holyhead and Anglesey Chronicle, but to be more accessible, Wood drew her inspiration strictly from the tabloids.

Wood wrote six items in the first half of the show, including a requiem for Guy the Gorilla, a song about 'battered wives' (inspired by an article in The Sun about domestic violence). A song called 'Road Blocks' about a motorcycle accident, and a melancholy number titled 'Love Song'. The second half featured a sketch by Wood called 'Dear Mum', about a middle classed woman who refuses to visit her mother in hospital, and also a harrowing song titled 'Abortion.'

In the cast was Julie Walters. Having only met Wood briefly four years before, the two hit it off immediately. Wood also performed in the show, but said later "There was a sketch set in Belfast and I couldn't do the accent, so they made me a deaf mute."

Wood received much critical acclaim for her work on the show though. The Daily Telegraph said her songs "successfully blend a gallows humour with an unexpected touch of humanity", and Time Out wrote "Victoria Wood's musical epigrams brilliantly embroider the action".

The revue was initially too short, and making up the shortfall, Wood discovered a new talent, writing comedy sketches. The sketch 'Sex' was set in a Manchester library and starred Walters as a teenage girl who thinks she's pregnant asking Alison Fiske (as the librarian) advice. As almost the only comedy in the show, it came as a welcome relief to the audience and went down extremely well. During the writing process, Wood said she discovered her true voice. "It was the first thing I'd written with proper jokes and I thought "aha!" I'd suddenly found something I could do. It was a blinding flash, like learning a new language." The Times said of the sketch that she was a "great discovery" who "got more poetry out of Manchester speech than I had heard for years".

The cast also included Godfrey Jackman, Philip Jackson and Clive Merrison. The production ran from 13 July to 6 August 1978.

Due to Wood's acclaim, then theatre director David Leland commissioned her first play Talent.
