= Bianca Lamblin =

French writer (1921–2011)

Bianca Lamblin (born Bienenfeld; 29 April 1921 – 5 November 2011) was a French writer who had affairs with philosophers Jean-Paul Sartre and Simone de Beauvoir for a number of years. In her book Mémoires d'une jeune fille dérangée (published in English as A Disgraceful Affair), she wrote that, while a student at Lycée Molière, she was sexually exploited by her teacher Beauvoir, who was in her 30s. In correspondence between Sartre and Beauvoir, the pseudonym Louise Védrine was used when referring to Bianca in Lettres au Castor and Lettres à Sartre.

== Biography ==
Bianca Lamblin was born in 1921 in Lublin, to Jewish parents. She was a cousin of the French writer Georges Perec. In 1937, her teacher was Simone de Beauvoir. She also met Sartre at this time. In Paris, Bianca was friends with Jean Kanapa, Yvonne Picard, Raoul Lévy and Bernard Lamblin. She married Bernard Lamblin and they had two children. Bianca became a teacher, and after Simone de Beauvoir's death, Bianca wrote Mémoires d'une jeune fille dérangée.

== Bibliography ==
- Mémoires d'une jeune fille dérangée (1994, LGF – Livre de Poche; ISBN 978-2253135937/2006, Balland; ISBN 978-2-7158-0994-9)

== See also ==
- Olga Kosakiewicz
- Natalie Sorokin

== Sources ==
- Jean-Paul Sartre (1983). Lettres au Castor et à quelques autres, tome 1 : 1926–1939. Paris: Gallimard. ISBN 978-2-07-026078-2
- Simone de Beauvoir (1990). Lettres à Sartre, tome 1 : 1930–1939. Paris: Gallimard. ISBN 2-07-071829-8
- Deirdre Blair (1991). Simone de Beauvoir: A Biography. New York: Touchstone. ISBN 978-0-671-74180-8
