= Troubled Sleep =

1949 novel by Jean-Paul Sartre

- Cover of the first edition
- Author: Jean-Paul Sartre
- Original title: La mort dans l'âme
- Translator: Gerard Hopkins
- Language: French
- Series: The Roads to Freedom
- Genre: Philosophical fiction, stream of consciousness
- Publisher: Gallimard, Knopf, Vintage
- Publication date: 1949
- Publication place: France
- English publication date: 1950
- Pages: 432
- ISBN: 0-679-74079-1 (Vintage)
- OCLC: 25026369
- Dewey Decimal: 843/.914 20
- LC Class: PQ2637.A82 M5613 1992
- Preceded by: The Reprieve
- Followed by: The Last Chance

Troubled Sleep (French: La mort dans l'âme, published in the United Kingdom as Iron in the Soul is a 1949 novel by Jean-Paul Sartre. It is the third part in the trilogy Les chemins de la liberté (The Roads to Freedom).

"The third novel in Sartre's monumental Roads to Freedom series, Troubled Sleep powerfully depicts the fall of France in 1940, and the anguished feelings of a group of Frenchmen whose pre-war apathy gives way to a consciousness of the dignity of individual resistance — to the German occupation and to fate in general — and solidarity with people similarly oppressed." — Random House
