= Wanda Kosakiewicz =

French actress

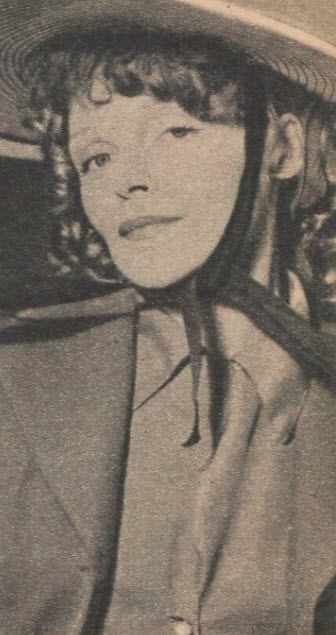
Wanda Kosakiewicz in 1948.

Wanda Kosakiewicz (Ukrainian: Ванда Козакевич; 1917–1989), French theatre actress in the 1940s, was one of Jean-Paul Sartre's love interests and Olga Kosakiewicz's sister. Sartre wrote that she was one of the reasons that his friendship with Albert Camus went sour. Her relations with both rival philosophers featured in the book The Boxer and the Goalkeeper by Andy Martin (Simon & Schuster, 2012); she appears as Wanda in Lettres à Sartre, and Tania in Lettres au Castor.
