= Natalie Sorokin =

French woman who had relations with Simone de Beauvoir and Jean-Paul Sartre

Natalie Sorokin(e) (17 May 1921 – 20 December 1968) was a French woman who had relations with Simone de Beauvoir and Jean-Paul Sartre. Beauvoir was suspended from her teaching job after seducing her 17-year-old lycée pupil in 1939. Sorokin, along with Bianca Lamblin and Olga Kosakiewicz, later stated that their relationships with Sartre and de Beauvoir damaged them psychologically.

== Early life ==
Sorokin was born in Istanbul, Turkey, to White Russian émigrés Porfiry Sorokin and his wife, Natalia Sorokina.

== Existential life with Simone de Beauvoir ==
In June 1943, Sorokin's mother complained to the school authorities that de Beauvoir had led her daughter astray. De Beauvoir was accused of behavior leading to the corruption of a minor and her teaching license was suspended for the rest of her life. Sorokin later said her relationship with de Beauvoir and Sartre came to an end when she found this relationship serving only one party.

== Later life ==
After recovering from her trauma, Sorokin started writing and worked for radio. She later married Ivan Moffat, a friend of de Beauvoir and Sartre's and son of the British actress and poet Iris Tree and artist and photographer Curtis Moffat. Their marriage was brief and produced one daughter.

== See also ==
- Olga Kosakiewicz
- Bianca Lamblin
