= Who Shall Die =

- Original language: French
- Written by: Simone de Beauvoir
- Characters: Jean-Pierre; Louis; Catherine; Clarice; Jeanne; Georges; Rosbourg; Jacques
- Subject: Feminism; Power; Suffering
- Genre: Existentialism, Drama
- Setting: 14th Century Vaucelles, Flanders

Premiere
- Date: 1945

Who Shall Die or Les Bouches inutiles (The Useless Mouths) is the only Drama written by Simone de Beauvoir.

The play takes place in 14th Century Vaucelles, a city in Flanders. The Useless Mouths centers around the d’Avesnes' family and their adopted children, Jean-Pierre and Jeanne during the siege against the Burgundians. The play deals with themes of feminism, power, and suffering. Simone de Beauvoir's other popular work includes, The Second Sex, The Mandarins, The Prime of Life, Memoirs of a Dutiful Daughter, and The Force of Circumstance.

== Background ==
Who Shall Die was written during World War II in 1943. During this time, Beauvoir created a social ethic for existentialism and titled this stage of her writing her, “moral period”. This was also during a time when French existentialist philosophers such as Beauvoir, Albert Camus and Jean-Paul Sartre were seeking fame in not just France, but America as well. Therefore, the authors started addressing both French and American audiences, trying to make their existentialist philosophy more accessible. Who Shall Die was originally published in French and consists of two acts and eight scenes.

== Characters ==
Jean-Pierre Gauthier is the adopted son the d’Avesnes', and the biological brother of Jeanne. Jean-Pierre had been sent by Louis d’Avesnes to talk to the King of France about relieving their city, Vaucelles. He has been gone for three months and the play commences the day he returns to Vaucelles. He is in a secret relationship with Clarice, the d’Avsesnes' biological daughter.

Louis d’Avesnes is one of the three aldermen of Vaucelles. Husband to Catherine, and father to Clarice and Georges. Louis struggles with keeping his city, Vaucelles prosperous while also trying to keep his family safe. Louis wishes to marry his daughter, Clarice to another alderman, Jacques Van Der Welde.

Catherine d’Avesnes is married to Louis, and is very protective of her family. She is also very supportive of her adopted son, Jean-Pierre. Catherine spends most of the play feeling powerless, especially to her husband, Louis who holds a lot of authority and power in the city of Vaucelles. She relies on Jean-Pierre to fix her problems instead of taking them into her own hands.

Clarice d’Avesnes is the daughter of the d’Avesnes', and is in love with her adopted brother, Jean-Pierre. Clarice despises her brother, Georges and only sees his power, and his lust for her.

Jeanne Gauthier is the sister of Jean-Pierre, to whom she confides in. She is in a relationship with Georges, but she knows in her heart that he is evil.

Georges d’Avesnes is very jealous of his adopted brother, Jean-Pierre, and wishes that his father, Louis would entrust him with more power. He is in a relationship with Jeanne, however, he lusts over his biological sister, Clarice. Georges and Rosbourg plan to kill Louis, and Jacques in order to assume power in Vaucelles.

François Rosbourg is one of the three aldermen. He wants more power than he already has, and Georges and he conspire against the other two aldermen, Jacques and Louis.

Jacques Van Der Welde is one of the three aldermen. He acts as Louis confidant. He is interested in Clarice, especially since he has her father, Louis approval.

Other characters

The captain, Master builder, four soldiers, four old women, four young women, two masons, three old men, two bagbearers, two merchants, five representatives, a young couple, children, and townspeople.

== Summary ==
Who Shall Die takes place in 14th Century Vaucelles, a city in Flanders.

=== Act 1 ===
Scene 1

The setting is the fortification of Vaucelles during the siege of the Burgundians. Three soldiers keep warm around a small fire and discuss the cities lack of food. A sentinel comes in from the ramparts with Jean-Pierre Gauthier, who he assumes to be a Burgundian spy. The three soldiers recognize him and claim that it's Jean-Pierre. Jean-Pierre announces that he must deliver news of the King to Louis d’Avesnes at once. Louis enters and Jean-Pierre delivers the new from the King of France who has declared: “I will come to relieve Vaucelles. It is in my best interest as well as in yours.” But the King plans to do so next spring because he must take out the Burgundians before coming to Flanders. Two women beg the soldiers for some food, but the soldiers argue that they barely have enough ration for themselves. Jean-Pierre asks them if their intentions are to let the women die, but Louis tells him to leave the soldiers alone and let them eat.

Scene 2

The setting takes place in the town square. There are noises of hammers and saws from the masons and carpenters working on the Belfry in the back, and to the side is a line of townspeople standing in line waiting for food at the City Hall. Jean-Pierre enters with his sister, Jeanne. They discuss how Vaucelle has changed since Jean-Pierre left three months ago, particularly with the rise of townspeople without food. The siblings discuss the d’Avesnes children, Clarice, who Jean-Pierre is seeing, and Georges, who Jeanne is seeing. Clarice enters and Jean-Pierre says that he has yearned for her since the day he left, but Clarice says he is nothing but a ghost to her, and there was no suffering during their time apart so they should no longer see each other. Two masons and the Master builder discuss how tired they are and that they don't understand how they are supposed to finish construction on the Belfry with only being fed grass porridge. However, they feel that they must finish the construction on the Belfry for the Kings arrival next spring. Jacques Van der Welde enters, sees Clarice and asks her if she will ever love him. She states that she doesn't believe in love and that she refuses to become a wife of an alderman like her mother. Suddenly a scream is heard from the construction site. A mason fell from the scaffold due to malnutrition. Louis and Rosbourg enter and Jacques explains to his fellow aldermen what has just happened, to which Louis exclaims that these accidents are happening too often due to malnutrition. Rosbourg butts in and wonders if Vaucelle even needs a Belfry. Jacques responds that the workmen accept their suffering because they have the Belfry to look forward to in the future, and if they were to stop construction then they’d be force to live in the present. Louis doesn't want to make a decision spur of the moment, so he decides to hold a city council meeting in the near future. However, the three aldermen admit that they don't know how to fix the problem surrounding the lack of food. Jean-Pierre enters and Louis nominates him to be Food Controller of Vaucelles. Jean-Pierre refuses the position because he does not want to be responsible if townspeople die. Bagbearers come in to distribute food to the townspeople. One of the masons asks for bread, but the bagbearer says it's only meant for the needy. A fight breaks out because the masons feel that only people who work should be fed.

Scene 3

The setting takes place in the home of Louis d’Avesnes. Catherine, his wife is seen pushing an older woman out of the house as townspeople try to push their way in. Georges and Jeanne discuss Jean-Pierre being offered Food Controller, and Georges exclaims that it should have gone to him since he is Louis' son. Georges then asks Jeanne if Jean-Pierre is in love with Clarice, but Jeanne refuses to answer any of his questions even after Georges wrings her wrists. Jean-Pierre enters the house to speak with Catherine, who doesn't understand why Jean-Pierre denied the position Food Controller and says that she will let him marry Clarice if he assumes the position. Jean-Pierre refuses, and says he doesn't want Clarice because everyone lives and dies alone. Georges, having heard enough screaming from the townspeople outside picks up a bow and aims to shoot at the townspeople. Georges eventually lowers his weapon, but Jeanne starts crying, knowing that he would have killed the townspeople. Catherine tells Jeanne that he needs a woman like her by his side, but Jeanne says that she is not strong enough and will never be happy with him. Clarice, alone on stage, looks at her face in a mirror as Jean-Pierre comes behind her and kisses her. Clarice asks him if he loves her, but Jean-Pierre reminds her that the word love means nothing to him. Clarice threatens Jean-Pierre and says that she intends to marry Jacques Van Der Welde because at least he can admit that he loves her. Jean-Pierre exclaims that her life will be empty if she marries Jacques, and then races out of the d'Avesnes' house. Clarice admits to Catherine and Jeanne that she is pregnant with Jean-Pierre's child. Georges, who has been hiding during the remainder of this scene calls his sister a whore for sleeping with Jean-Pierre and threatens to tell their father. Louis walks in from his council meeting and Georges immediately tells his father that Clarice is pregnant with Jean-Pierre's baby. Louis is okay with this, which makes Georges even more enraged. Catherine knows something bad must have happened at the council meeting due to his composed reaction. Louis admits that the council has decided to get rid of any useless townspeople by putting them in the ditch at the foot of the fortifications. End of Act 1.

=== Act 2 ===
Scene 4

The setting takes place the following morning in the home of Louis d’Avesnes. Louis is having a conversation with the three aldermen, the Master builder and the three masons. The workmen explain that they still wish to finish the Belfry because then their suffering will have been worth it. Catherine expresses to Louis that she feels as though she is being condemned to die just in order to save a city. Jacques speaks with Clarice privately and tells her that she can come hide in his house to stay safe until the end of the siege. Clarice says that she doesn't need his help, and she will choose her own death. After Jacques exits, Clarice picks up a dagger, looks at it and then puts it back once she hears Georges enter. Georges reveals to Clarice that even though he is her brother, he lusts for her. Louis walks in on Georges attacking Clarice and asks Georges to leave at once and says that he is no longer his son. Georges retorts and says that his father is a hypocrite because he is sentencing Clarice to death with the council's plan.

Scene 5

The setting takes place in the town square. Jean-Pierre tells Catherine how he is enraged about the council's decision and how he plans to speak with the aldermen immediately. Catherine tells him that it's too late, and if he had accepted the position of Food Controller yesterday he might have been able to stop their decision. The three aldermen, Louis, Rosbourg and Jacques enter and Jean-Pierre threatens the three men by stating that he will revolt against them if they go through with their decision. Clarice and Jeanne enter as the aldermen address the townspeople in the distance. Catherine enters after hearing the aldermen's announcement and tells Jeanne and Clarice how after the bells rings, the guards will round up all the women and children and chase them into the ditch. Catherine adds that during the announcement, the men didn't stand up for their wives. Clarice pulls the dagger out and wishes to kill herself, but Jeanne intervenes and calls out Jean-Pierre's name as he races to the rescue, and take the dagger out of Clarice's possession. He looks at Clarice and asks her, “Do you think that I am going to let you die without me?” Jean-Pierre tells Jeanne and Clarice that he will talk with the men of Vaucelles to persuade them to storm the camp of the Burgundians instead of going through with the council's wretched plan. Jean-Pierre then tells Clarice that he loves her even though he couldn't say it yesterday. Clarice admits that she loves him as well and that she has been suffering acting as though she didn't love him. Jeanne overhears Georges and Rosbourg talking about killing Louis and Jacques so they can assume power. Georges finds Jeanne spying on them. The scene ends with Georges walking away laughing as Jeanne is left on stage.

Scene 6

The setting is in the home of Louis d’Avesnes. Catherine enters with many women around her as they beg Catherine to save them, saying that she is their only hope. Clarice enters and tells her mother, Catherine how Jean-Pierre will save them. Catherine approves of Jean-Pierre and Clarice being in love, and tells Clarice to run away with him to France. Clarice asks if Catherine would come with them, but Catherine knows that nothing can save her. Clarice leaves and Catherine takes a dagger and straps it to her. Louis enters as Catherine begins to berate him, exclaiming that he has betrayed her and how their love was only a lie. Jacques and Jean-Pierre enter, holding a bleeding Jeanne. Jeanne mutters that Georges plans to kill Louis to assume power. Jacques wants to call the cops to arrest Georges, but Louis doesn't think it matters at this point. Catherine goes up to Louis and tries to stab them both with her dagger. Louis is able to take the dagger from her, and realizes that this means she still loves him because she wanted both of them to die together. Clarice enters and announces that Jeanne has died and that Georges murdered her. The scene ends with Louis deciding to hold another city council meeting.

Scene 7

The setting is in City Hall. Louis addresses the council and suggests giving weapons to everyone, including women and children to storm the camp of the Burgundians, but the council disagrees. Jean-Pierre enters saying that the law needs three votes from the aldermen, and reveals that Rosbourg, one of the aldermen, is a traitor. Jean-Pierre brings in Georges to testify that this is true, and then the guards take both Georges and Rosbourg away. Jacques nominates Jean-Pierre to take Rosbourg's alderman position and Jean-Pierre graciously accepts. Jean-Pierre then addresses the council about changing the decision to throw the women and children down the ditch. The scene ends with council taking another vote.

Scene 8

The setting is night time at the foot of the ramparts. A captain hands out weapons to all the townspeople, including women and children. Catherine and Clarice are seen giving out food. Townspeople talk about how they will make the Burgundians pay for making them starve for so many months. Jacques tells Jean-Pierre how he plans to set the Belfry on fire and how the city will be in flames before the Burgundians have a chance to come through. Catherine fears that perhaps she should have let the council go through with their decision to throw the women and children down the ditch because now she is sentencing the men to death. Jean-Pierre reminds her that no matter what plan the council chose, there would be consequences. The bell strikes twice as the men say goodbye to their wives and then head towards the gate. End of play.

== Themes ==
Who Shall Die brings up questions surrounding feminism, power and the violence that comes along with that, and suffering in the present in order to live free in the future.

The women in the play, Catherine, Clarice, and Jeanne are powerless to the men. Catherine's husband, Louis decides the townswomen's fate with the two other aldermen and the council, which is made up of all men. Catherine, a woman, has no say in this decision and all she can do is beg Louis to change the councils decision. Clarice can't tell Jean-Pierre that she loves him because he has forced her to believe that the word love doesn't mean anything. Once Jean-Pierre admits his love for her, only then does she come out of her suffering and admit her love for him as well. Georges physically abuses Clarice after admitting his lust for her. Clarice begs him to stop, but he refuses to only until the man of the house, Louis enters. Jeanne is forced into a loveless relationship with Georges, and once she finally finds out the truth about him, he beats her and leaves her to die in the middle of the town square.

The men have power of the women until the end of the play when Beauvoir asks the question, who shall die? No matter which plan the council chooses, people will die. Georges and Rosbourg want to assume power over the other two aldermen, and take control of Vaucelles. Jean-Pierre doesn't assume power when asked to be Vaucelles Food Controller because he is afraid that he will let the townspeople down.

Beauvoir believes that everyone can choose whether they want to suffer or not, and once one recognizes this, then they are truly free. For the masons, they prefer suffering while reconstructing the Belfry with little to no food, so they can impress the King of France next spring. For Jean Pierre, he ends Clarice's suffering and finally tells her that he loves her. For Catherine, she would rather kill both Louis and her, than have one of them living without the other, suffering.

== Reception ==
Although Who Shall Die is one her lesser-known works, Beauvoir has received much attention for her feminist philosophy, especially The Second Sex. Beauvoir often used literary writing as a vehicle to showcase her philosophy. In Who Shall Die Beauvoir tells a story about political power in a somewhat historically accurate setting to expound her feminist existentialist philosophy.

== See also ==
- Simone de Beauvoir
- The Second Sex
- Feminist existentialism
- Existentialism
- Feminism in France
