= Philosophical fiction =

Literary genre of fiction with philosophical themes

- Features: Significant proportion devoted to discussion of questions normally addressed in discursive philosophy

Subgenres
- Novel of ideas

Philosophical fiction is any fiction that devotes a significant portion of its content to the sort of questions addressed by philosophy. It might explore any facet of the human condition, including the function and role of society, the nature and motivation of human acts, the purpose of life, ethics or morals, the role of art in human lives, the role of experience or reason in the development of knowledge, whether there exists free will, or any other topic of philosophical interest. Philosophical fiction includes the novel of ideas, which can also fall under the genre of science fiction, utopian and dystopian fiction, and bildungsroman.

== Definition ==
There is no universally accepted definition of philosophical fiction, but a sampling of notable works can help to outline its history. For example, a Platonic dialogue could be considered philosophical fiction. Some modern philosophers have written novels, plays, or short fiction in order to demonstrate or introduce their ideas. Common examples include Voltaire, Fyodor Dostoevsky, Thomas Mann, Hermann Hesse, Albert Camus, Jean-Paul Sartre, Simone de Beauvoir and Ayn Rand. Authors who admire certain philosophers may incorporate their ideas into the principal themes or central narratives of novels. Some examples include The Moviegoer (Walker Percy), Thus Spoke Zarathustra (Nietzsche), Wittgenstein's Mistress (David Markson), and Speedboat (Renata Adler).

== Origin ==
The absolute monarchy consolidated under Louis XIV, which brought the height of royal power and a return to moral order, censored numerous literary publications. Heirs to the libertines of the 17th century, critical thinkers like Voltaire and Diderot became known as the philosophers of the Enlightenment. In the name of reason and moral values, they denounced the oppressions of their time. Most of them suffered censorship or imprisonment. As a result, some published clandestinely, while others sought the support of foreign rulers known as "enlightened despots." In an attempt to circumvent the prohibitions, these philosophers devised new literary genres, including the philosophical tale (conte philosophique), a fictional narrative that critiques society and those in power, conveying philosophical ideas and concepts such as the customs of the nobility, political regimes, religious fanaticism, and certain philosophical currents. It adopts the structure of the folktale and uses some of its formulations, such as "once upon a time," to circumvent the censorship prevalent at the time. Like the folktale, it belongs to the genre of the apologue, a short allegorical and argumentative story that conveys a moral lesson, and which also includes fables and utopias, among others. Voltaire is the foremost exponent of this genre, with Candide, Micromegas, and Zadig being his most representative works.

== Characteristics ==
=== Hybrid genre ===
The philosophical tale is a hybrid genre. It takes the characteristics of fairy tales and addresses philosophical questions. In Voltaire's Candide, for example, the traditional features of the tale are present: the action takes place in a castle, the time is indeterminate (although there are historical parallels, especially with the Lisbon earthquake of 1755), and the characters are mostly noble. There are also certain characteristics of the adventure novel, such as numerous escapades and long journeys. Voltaire wrote his tales in the same way as traditional tales, but modified them in his own way by inserting a philosophical thesis; it was a way of communicating his ideas. He added comic devices, such as irony, and sometimes approached the genre of farce. He also included a moral and elements of contemporary society, so that the reader could reflect on the tale and the question it raises. The philosophical tale also includes certain attributes of the picaresque genre, such as the fact that the hero crosses several social classes, or that they make fun of elevated feelings such as love.

=== Parody ===
The philosophical tale takes most of its structure from fairy tales, but parodies this genre by exaggerating some of its characteristics. It often includes fantastical elements, such as characters who die and then return to life without further explanation, while others die permanently. Furthermore, the characters are often caricatures: they are defined by a single character trait. The character of Candide, for example, can be understood simply by his name. But the world is real, and it often clashes with the author's contemporary society. This discrepancy is created through parody, a literary device that uses deviation, inversion, reduction, amplification, anachronism, and pun, twisting the rules of the parodied genre.

=== Satire ===
The philosophical tale often employs satire as a literary device. Satire is an effective way to denounce and critique society. It uses various techniques, such as caricature, irony, and black humor. Caricature allows the reader to laugh by offering an exaggerated image of reality, which is the very purpose of satirical literature. Voltaire uses this technique to criticize the nobility, a theme prominent in Candide. He also denounces the thinking of certain philosophers. Pangloss, for example, is a caricature of the German philosopher Leibniz. Black humor also makes many despicable and immoral things seem utterly banal. For example, in chapter 9 of the same book, Voltaire writes: "We buried my lord in a beautiful church, and threw Issachar in the trash."

=== Argumentative genre ===
The philosophical tale owes its fame to Voltaire, whose essays are realized through the use of comic or satirical characters and registers. Argumentation has always been linked to literature: the lightness of the narrative allows it to reach a wider readership and thus disseminate the philosophers' theses. The objective of argumentation is to present the development of certain ideas or opinions constructively, using arguments. To defend the ideas of the Enlightenment, "the themes of the writings were fictional because fiction seduces the reader and functions as bait: it bewitches through the story, making the moral (or the thesis defended) more 'digestible.'"

Every text has a topic, that is, a subject it addresses. But an argumentative text also includes a thesis, that is, an opinion or judgment that the speaker defends. Therefore, it is necessary to identify (and distinguish) the topic and the thesis. The thesis defended by the author is opposed by the counter-thesis, refuted thesis, or antithesis. In Voltaire's Candide, Pangloss embodies the thought of Leibniz, whose thesis is attacked by the author throughout the story. To defend his thesis and convey his ideas, the author of the text uses arguments: ideas, causes, and references. He supports and elaborates on them with examples.

The philosophical tale is necessarily a text of indirect argumentation; that is, the story and situations may captivate the reader, but the lesson the text imparts (implicitly or explicitly) must instruct the reader by providing moral content. Instead of proceeding with a demonstration based on the alternation of arguments and examples, the author, with this genre, chooses to convince the reader through a story that serves as the sole argument and through extensively developed examples.

== See also ==
- List of philosophical fiction authors
- Philosophy and literature
- Sci Phi Journal, online magazine dedicated to publishing science and philosophical fiction
- Literary fiction
