= Duroc station =

Metro station in Paris, France

Duroc
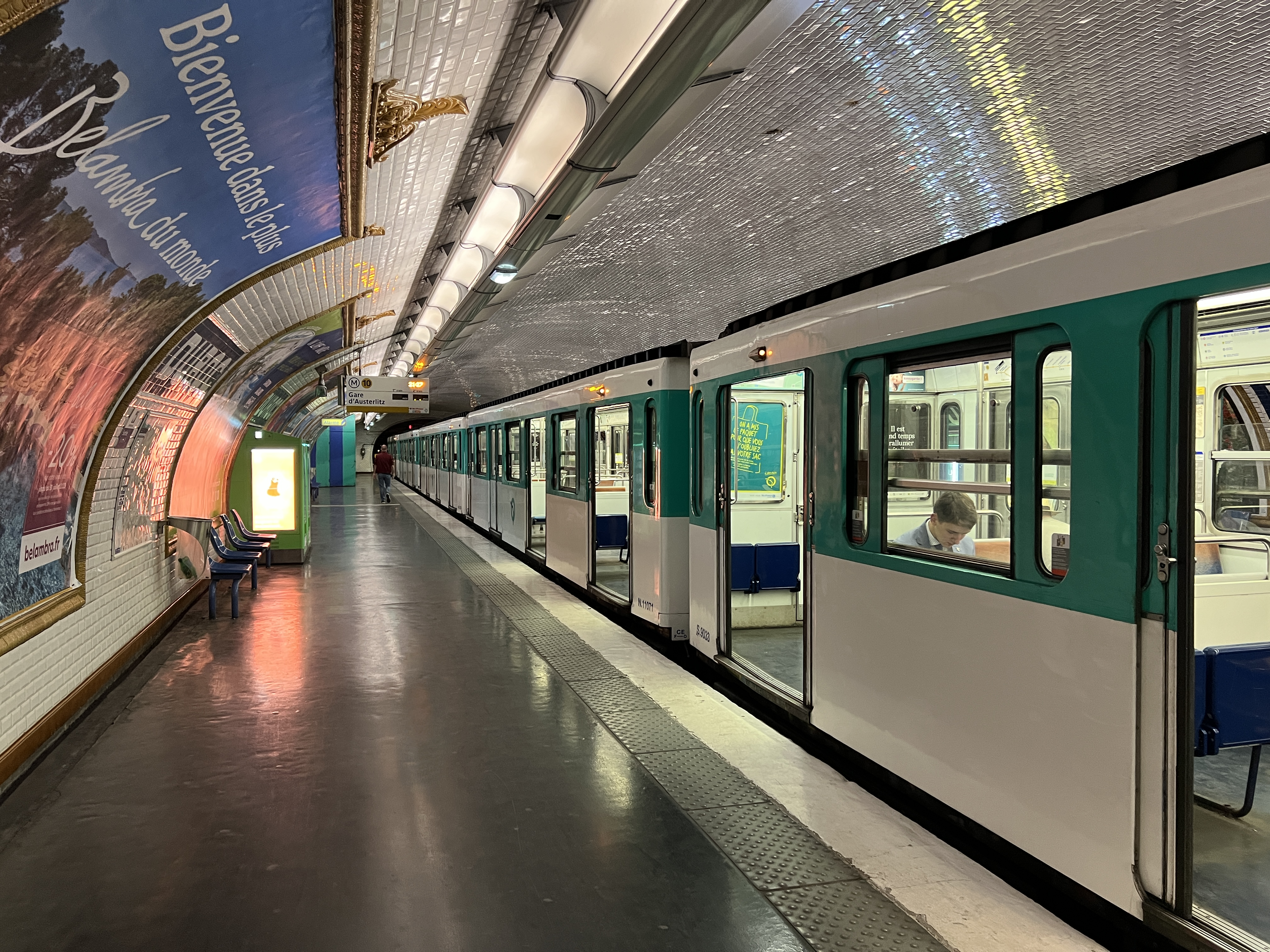
- MF 67 on line 10

General information
- Location: 6th, 7th and 15th arrondissement of Paris; Île-de-France; France
- Coordinates: 48°50′49″N 2°18′59″E
- System: Paris Métro station
- Owner: RATP
- Operator: RATP
- Line: Paris Metro Paris Metro Line 10 Paris Metro Line 13
- Platforms: 4 (4 side platforms)
- Tracks: 4

Construction
- Accessible: no

Other information
- Station code: 0207
- Fare zone: 1

History
- Opened: 30 December 1923

Passengers
- 2,645,064 (2021)

Services
| Preceding station | Paris Metro | Following station |
|---|---|---|
| Ségur towards Boulogne–Pont de Saint-Cloud | Line 10 | Vaneau towards Gare d'Austerlitz |
| Montparnasse–Bienvenüe towards Châtillon–Montrouge | Line 13 | Saint-François-Xavier towards Les Courtilles or Saint-Denis–Université |
Location
- Location within Paris

Duroc (French pronunciation: [dyʁɔk]) is a station on lines 10 and 13 of the Paris Métro. It is located at the point for which the 6th, 7th and 15th arrondissements share a common border, close to the location of an old toll gate on the road to Sèvres, part of the Wall of the Ferme générale, which was built around Paris between 1784 and 1791 by the ferme générale company of tax farmers. The station is named after the nearby rue Duroc, which in turn is named after Géraud Duroc, Duke of Frioul (1772–1813), who was one of Napoleon's generals, noted for his friendship with Napoleon Bonaparte, he is sometimes referred to as ‘Napoleon's shadow’ (l'ombre de Napoléon in French).

== History ==
Diagram showing the rerouting of lines in 1937

Line 10's station was opened by the Compagnie du chemin de fer métropolitain de Paris (CMP) on 30 December 1923 as part of the first section of the Ligne circulaire intérieure (inner circular line) from Invalides (now on line 13) to Croix-Rouge (a station east of Sèvres – Babylone, which was closed during World War II). The line was planned by Fulgence Bienvenüe to connect the city's six main railway stations, with Duroc presumably intended to serve the Gare Montparnasse, although it being located 500 metres away.

The project was eventually abandoned and on 27 July 1937, the section from Duroc to Invalides was transferred to become the first section of the old line 14. The section between Duroc and Croix-Rouge, by that time extended east to Jussieu remained as line 10. It extended west from Duroc to La Motte-Picquet–Grenelle on the same day.

On 9 November 1976, the old line 14 was incorporated into line 13 following the latter's extension in successive phases from Saint-Lazare.

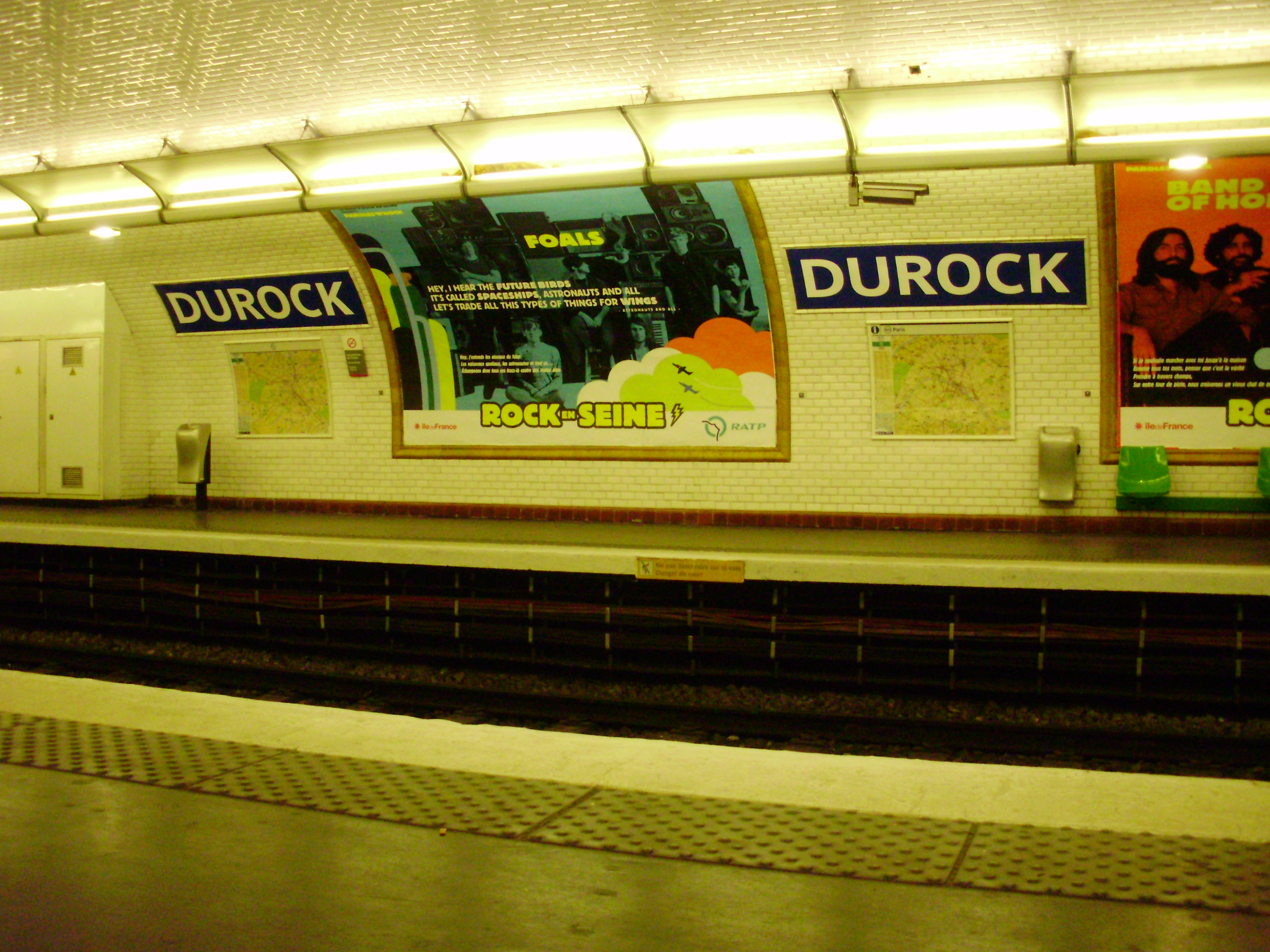
The station temporarily renamed "Durock"

Since 2004, the station has been temporarily renamed "Durock" on the occasion of the Rock en Seine festival almost every year for a week in June. Several rock-related posters are also placed on the walls of the platforms.

As part of the "Un métro + beau" programme by the RATP, the station's corridors were renovated and modernised on 21 October 2006.

In 2012, platform screen doors were installed on line 13's platforms, together with eleven other stations on the line in an attempt to increase the average speed of trains and reduce track-related incidents due to the line's heavy traffic.

On 6 December 2017, in a tribute to Johnny Hallyday (1963-2017), a French musician and actor who had died the night before, the station was temporarily renamed "Durock Johnny" for a day, with excerpts from his greatest hits played on the platforms.

In 2019, the station was used by 3,596,220 passengers, making it the 134th busiest of the Métro network out of 302 stations.

In 2020, the station was used by 1,972,711 passengers amidst the COVID-19 pandemic, making it the 124th busiest of the Métro network out of 304 stations.

In 2021, the station was used by 2,645,064 passengers, making it the 130th busiest of the Métro network out of 304 stations.

== Passenger services ==
=== Access ===
The station has 4 accesses:

- Access 1: Boulevard des Invalides Institut National des Jeunes Aveugles
- Access 2: rue de Sèvres
- Access 3: Place Léon-Paul Fargue
- Access 4: Boulevard du Montparnasse Hôpital Necker-Enfants malades

=== Station layout ===
Street Level
| B1 | Mezzanine |
| Line 13 platforms | Side platform, doors will open on the right |
| Line 13 platforms | Northbound | ← toward Les Courtilles or Saint-Denis–Université (Saint-François-Xavier) |
| Line 13 platforms | Southbound | toward Châtillon–Montrouge (Montparnasse–Bienvenüe) → |
| Line 13 platforms | Side platform, doors will open on the right |
| Line 10 platforms | Side platform, doors will open on the right |
| Line 10 platforms | Westbound | ← toward Boulogne–Pont de Saint-Cloud (Ségur) |
| Line 10 platforms | Eastbound | toward Gare d'Austerlitz (Vaneau) → |
| Line 10 platforms | Side platform, doors will open on the right |

=== Platforms ===
Both lines have a standard configuration with 2 tracks surrounded by 2 side platforms. Platform screen doors are installed on line 13's platforms.

=== Other connections ===
The station is also served by lines 28, 70, 82, 86, 89, and 92 of the RATP bus network.

== Nearby ==
- Association Valentin Haüy au service des aveugles et des malvoyants
- Hôpital Necker-Enfants malades
- Institut National des Jeunes Aveugles
- Ministry of the Overseas
- Musée Valentin Haüy

== Gallery ==
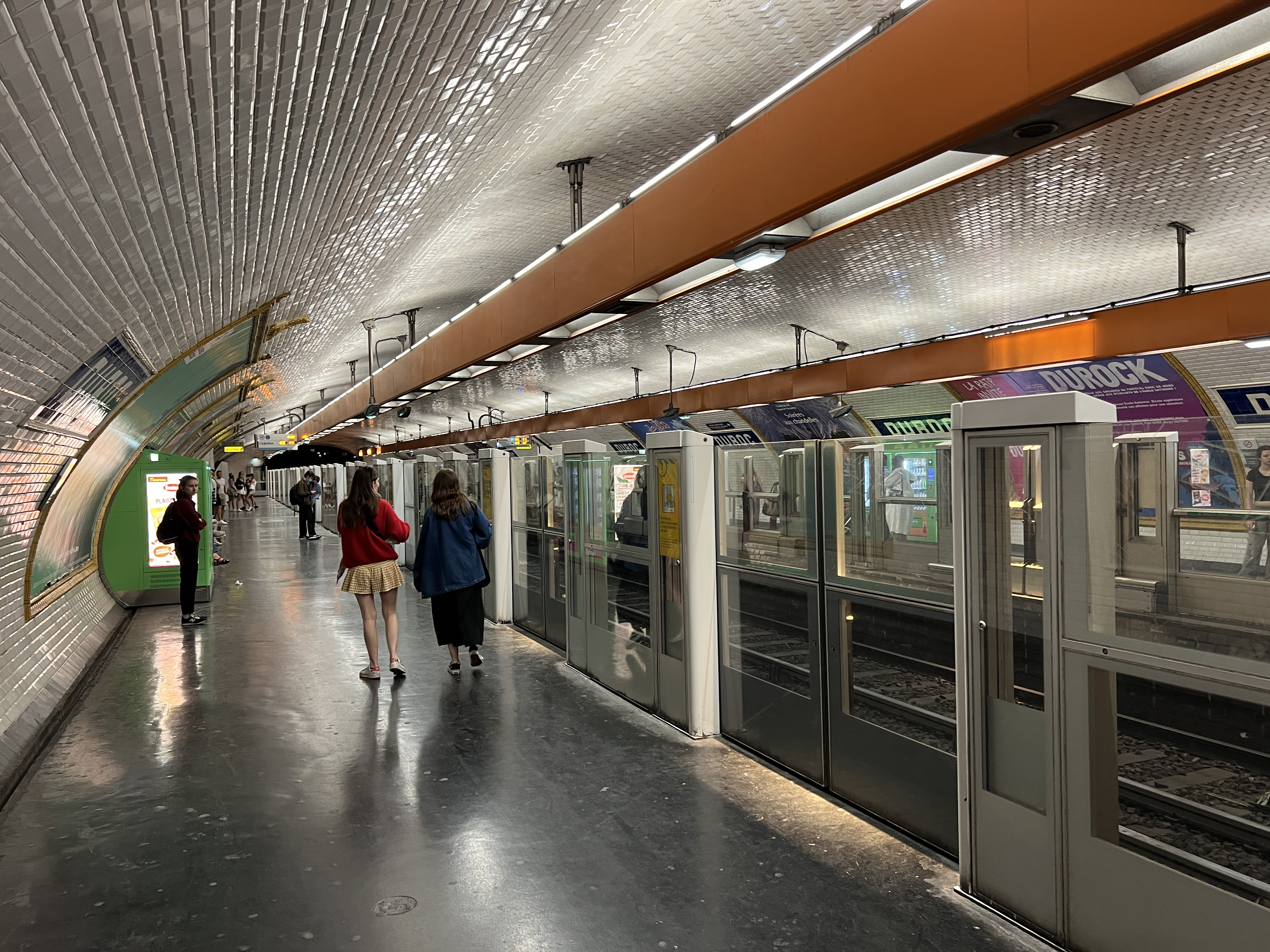
Line 13's platforms

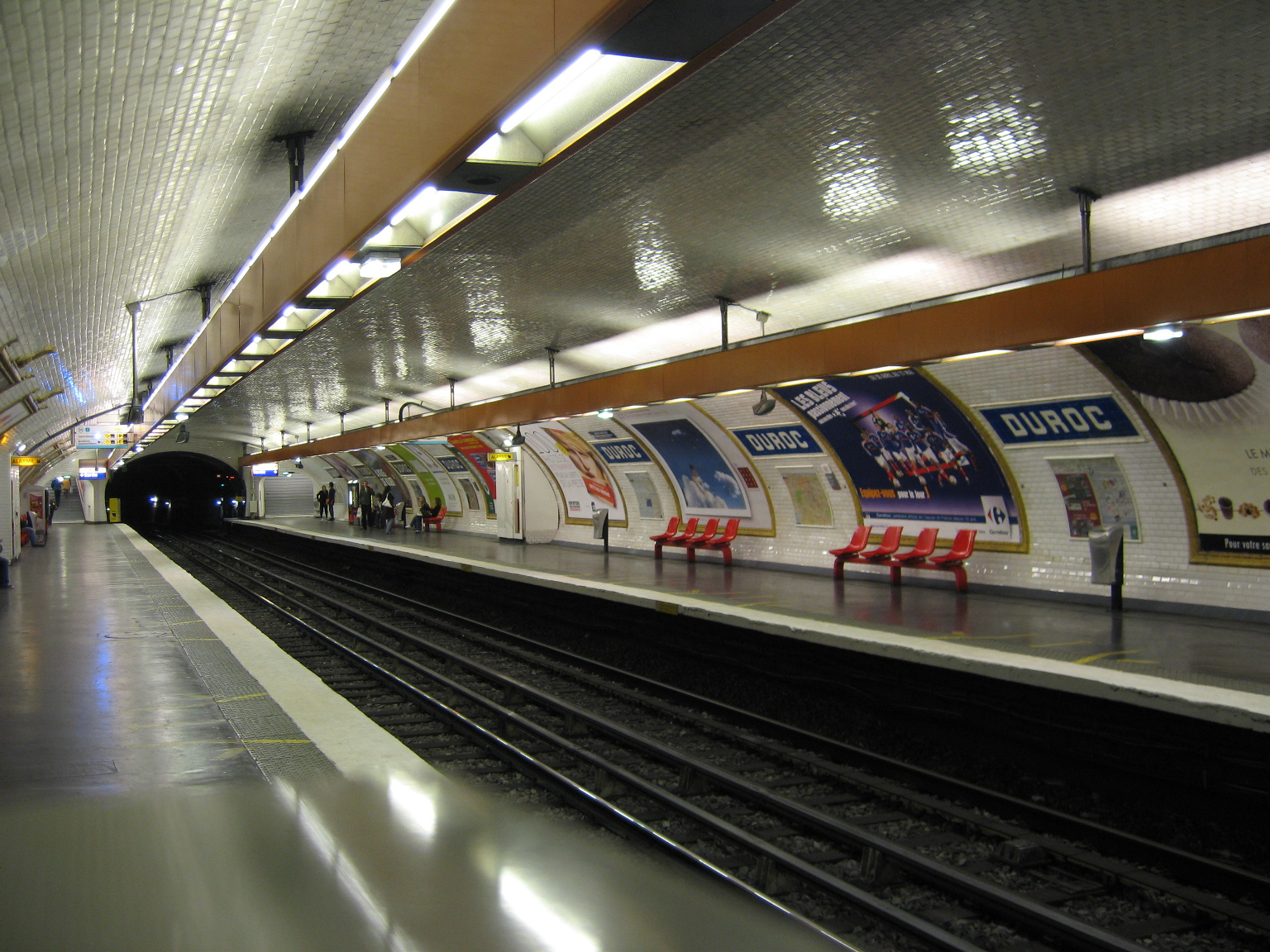
Line 13's platforms before the installation of platform screen doors

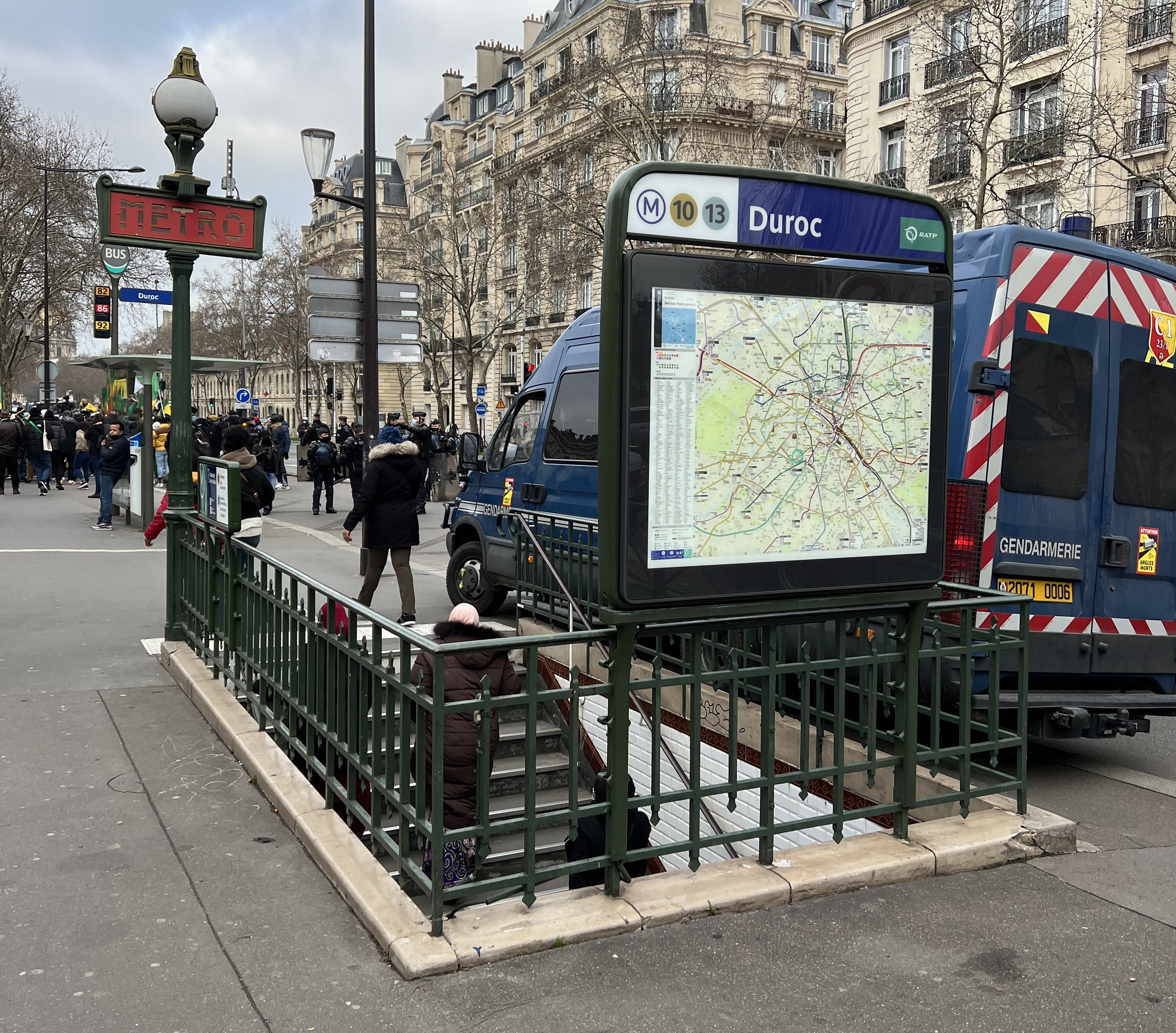
Access 1

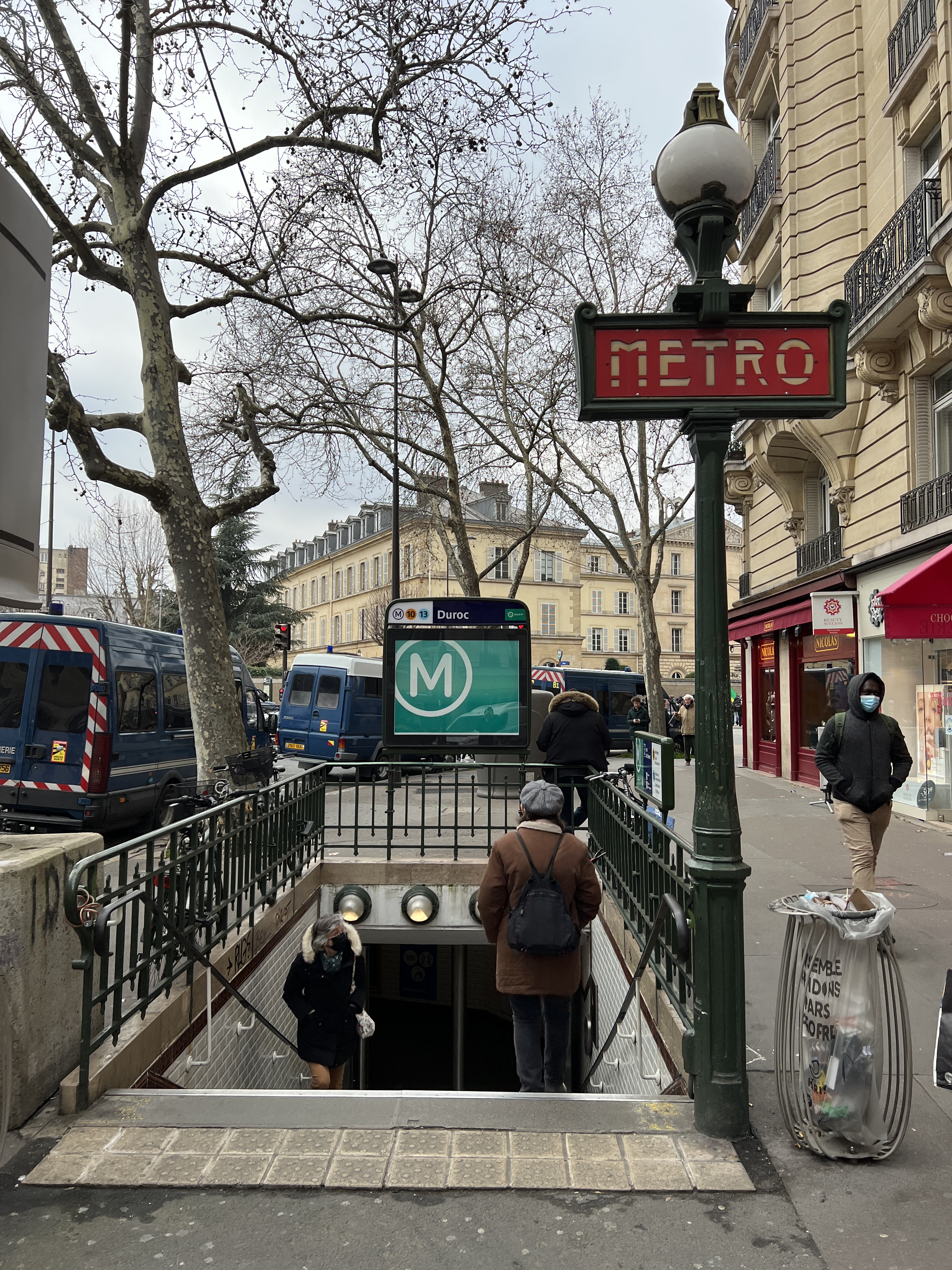
Access 2

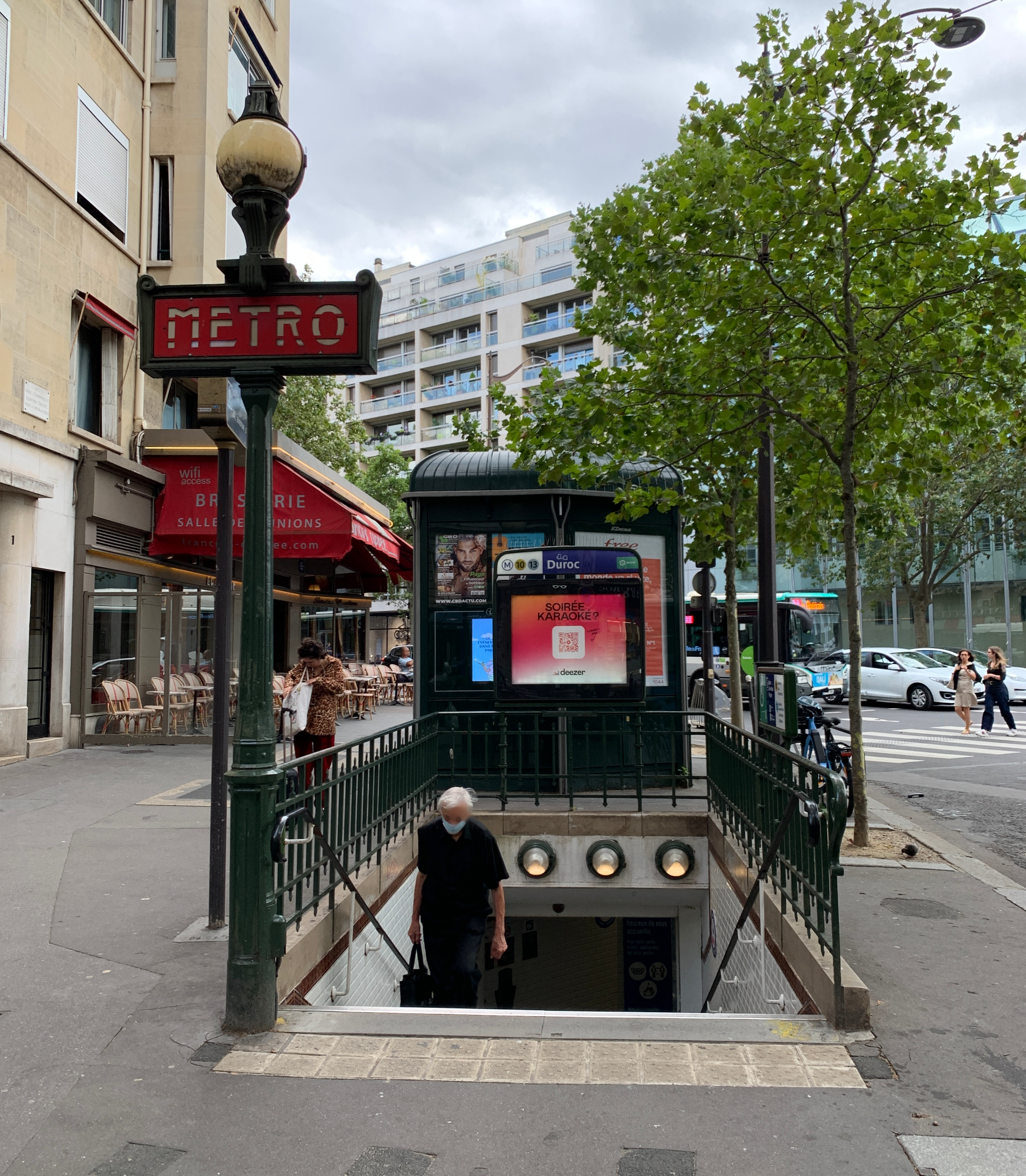
Access 3

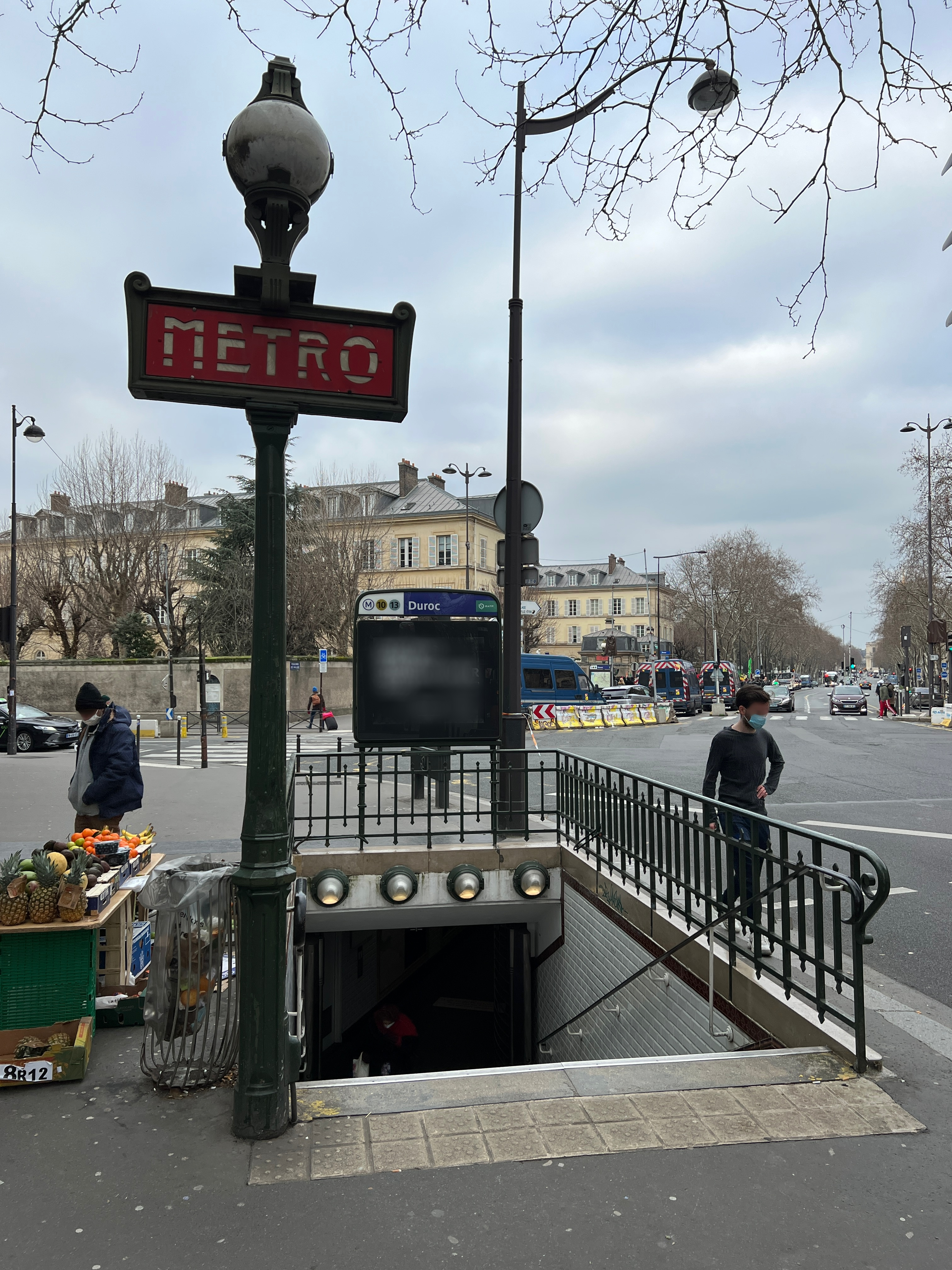
Access 4

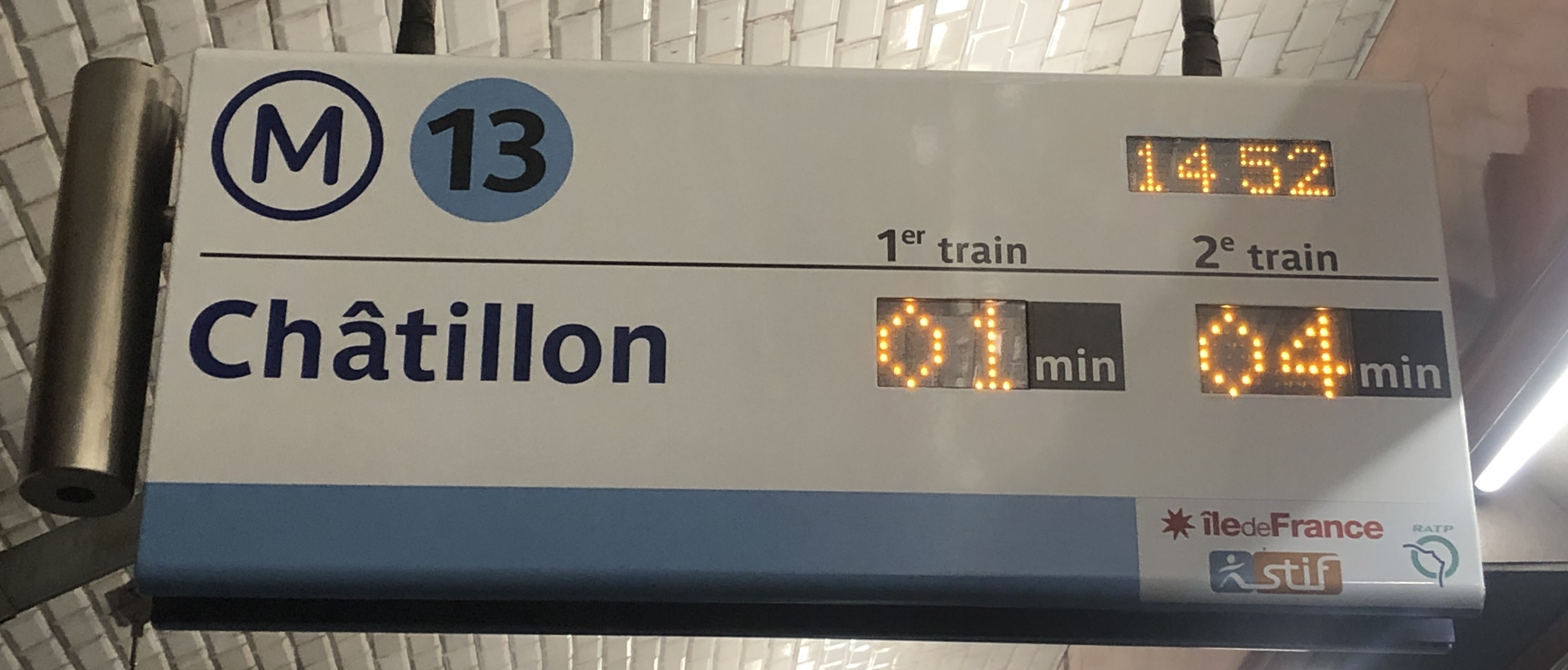
SIEL (old generation) at Line 13's platforms. Despite being almost replaced, some old panels remains.
