= Vaneau station =

Metro station in Paris, France

Vaneau
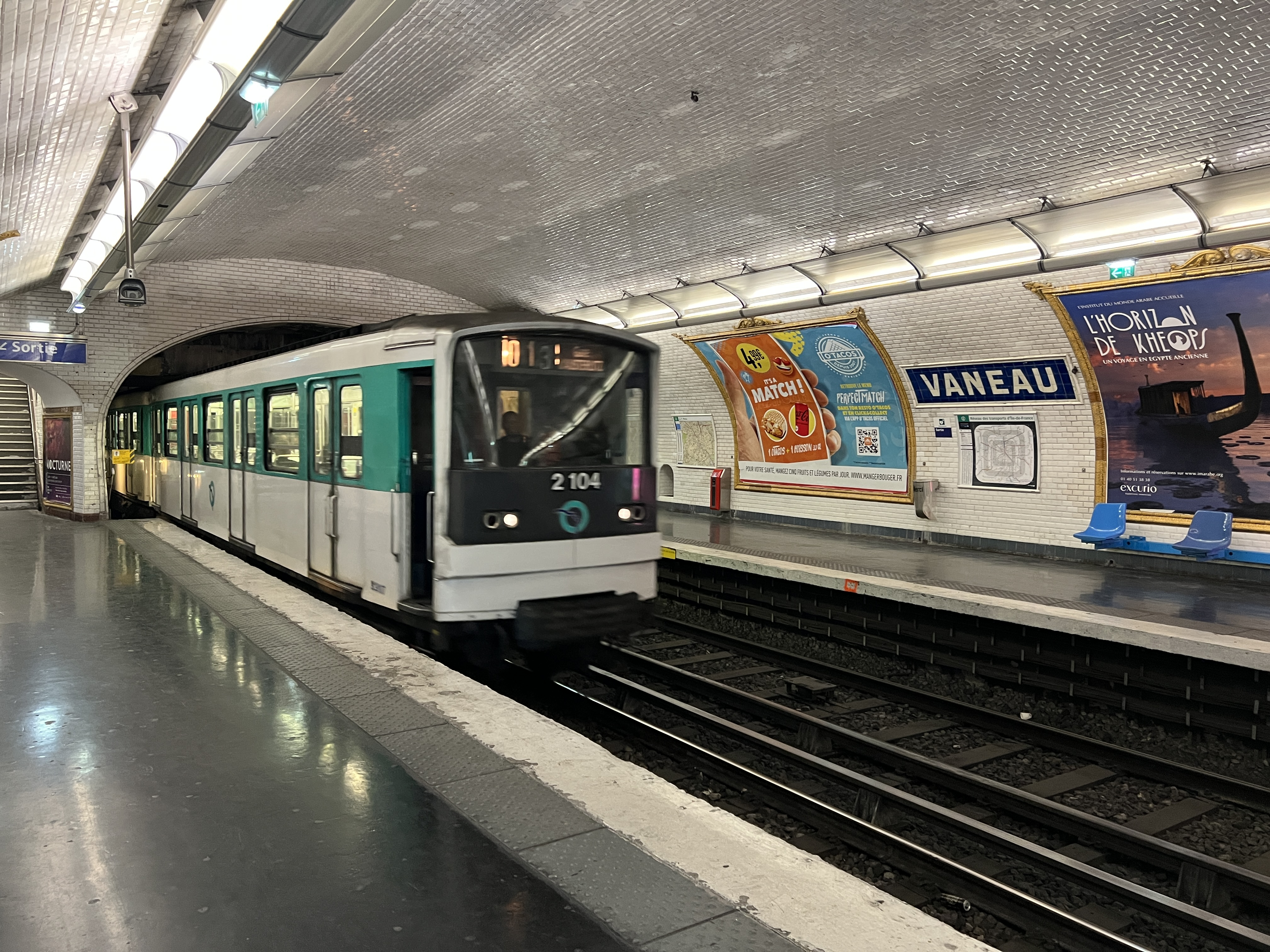
- MF 67 at Vaneau

General information
- Location: 6th and 7th arrondissement of Paris; Île-de-France; France
- Coordinates: 48°50′56″N 2°19′18″E
- System: Paris Métro station
- Owner: RATP
- Operator: RATP
- Line: Paris Metro Paris Metro Line 10
- Platforms: 2 (2 side platforms)
- Tracks: 2

Other information
- Station code: 02-08
- Fare zone: 1

History
- Opened: 30 December 1923

Passengers
- 725,826 (2021)

Services
Preceding station	Paris Metro	Following station
Duroc towards Boulogne–Pont de Saint-Cloud	Line 10	Sèvres–Babylone towards Gare d'Austerlitz
Location
- Location within Paris

Vaneau (French pronunciation: [vano]) is a station on line 10 of the Paris Metro, located on the border of the 6th and 7th arrondissements. It is named after the nearby rue Vaneau, which was in turn named after Louis Vaneau (1811-1830), a student who was killed during the July Revolution in 1830.

== History ==
The station was opened by the Compagnie du chemin de fer métropolitain de Paris (CMP) on 30 December 1923 as part of the first section of the Ligne circulaire intérieure (inner circular line) from Invalides (now on line 13) to Croix-Rouge (a station east of Sèvres – Babylone, which was closed during World War II) via Duroc. The project was eventually abandoned and on 27 July 1937, the section from Duroc to Invalides was transferred to become the first section of the old line 14, which was connected under the Seine and incorporated into line 13 on 9 November 1976.

In 2019, the station was used by 1,028,480 passengers, making it the 291st busiest of the Métro network out of 302 stations.

In 2020, the station was used by 524,526 passengers amidst the COVID-19 pandemic, making it the 287th busiest of the Métro network out of 304 stations.

In 2021, the station was used by 725,826 passengers, making it the 291st busiest of the Métro network out of 304 stations.

== Passenger services ==
=== Access ===
The station has a single access along rue de Sèvres.

=== Station layout ===
Street Level
B1	Mezzanine
Platform level	Side platform, doors will open on the right
Platform level	Westbound	← toward Boulogne – Pont de Saint-Cloud (Duroc)
Platform level	Eastbound	toward Gare d'Austerlitz (Sèvres – Babylone) →
Platform level	Side platform, doors will open on the right

=== Platforms ===
The station has a standard configuration with 2 tracks surrounded by 2 side platforms. The lower portion of the side walls are vertical instead of elliptical unlike other stations on the line, similar to the stations on the lines constructed by the Nord-Sud company (today lines 12 and 13).

=== Other connections ===
The station is also served by lines 70 and 86 of the RATP bus network.

== Gallery ==
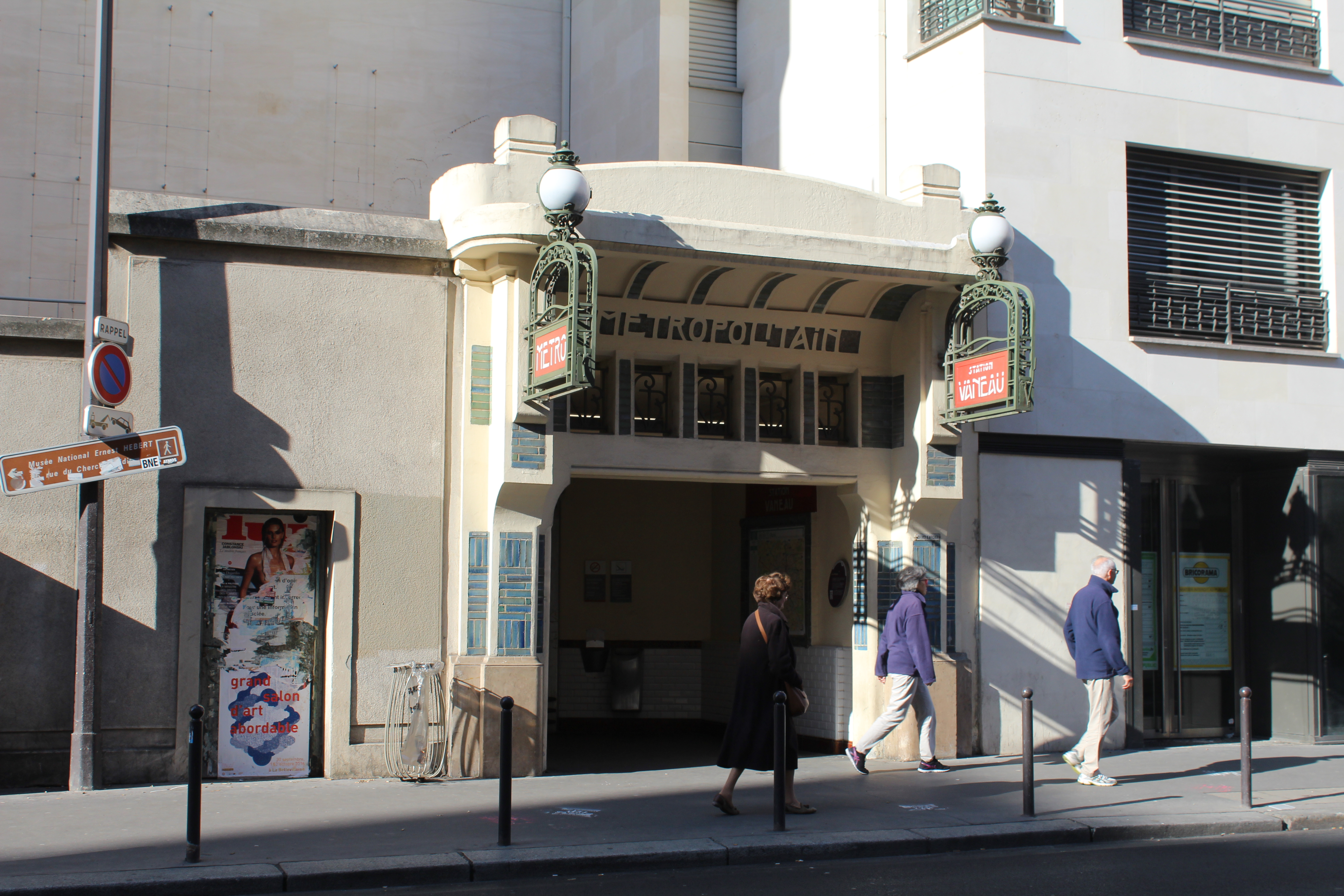
Access along rue de Sèvres

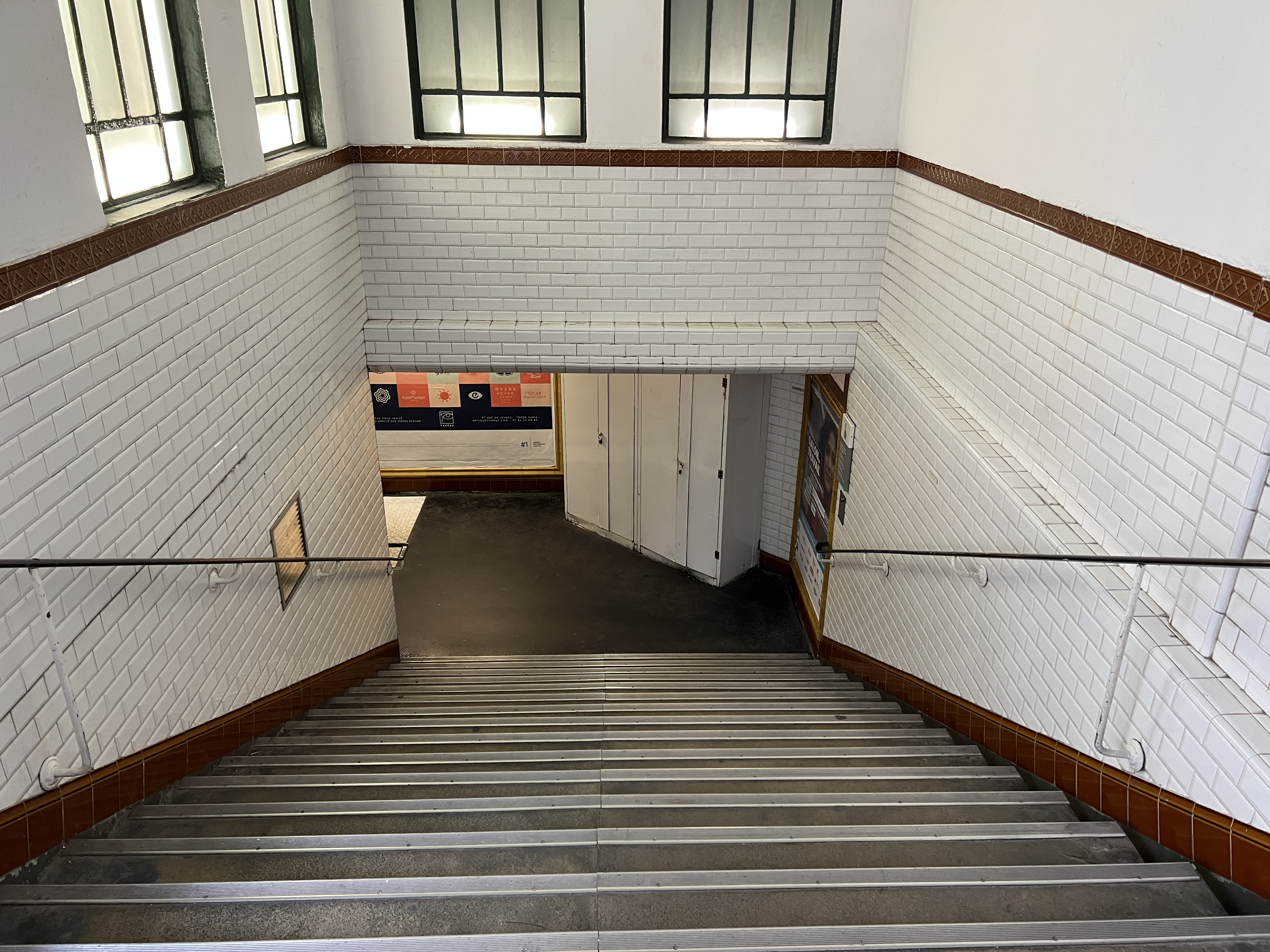
Stairs leading to the mezzanine
