= Duroc (disambiguation) =

Duroc may refer to:

- Duroc pig, an older breed of American domestic pig
- Duroc station, a station on the Paris Metro lines 10 and 13
- Géraud Duroc, duc de Frioul, a French general
- Duroc was a French aviso that wrecked on 13 August 1856 on Mellish Reef, 160 leagues (480 nautical miles (890 km)) off the coast of New Caledonia).
