= Mabillon station =

Metro station in Paris, France

Mabillon
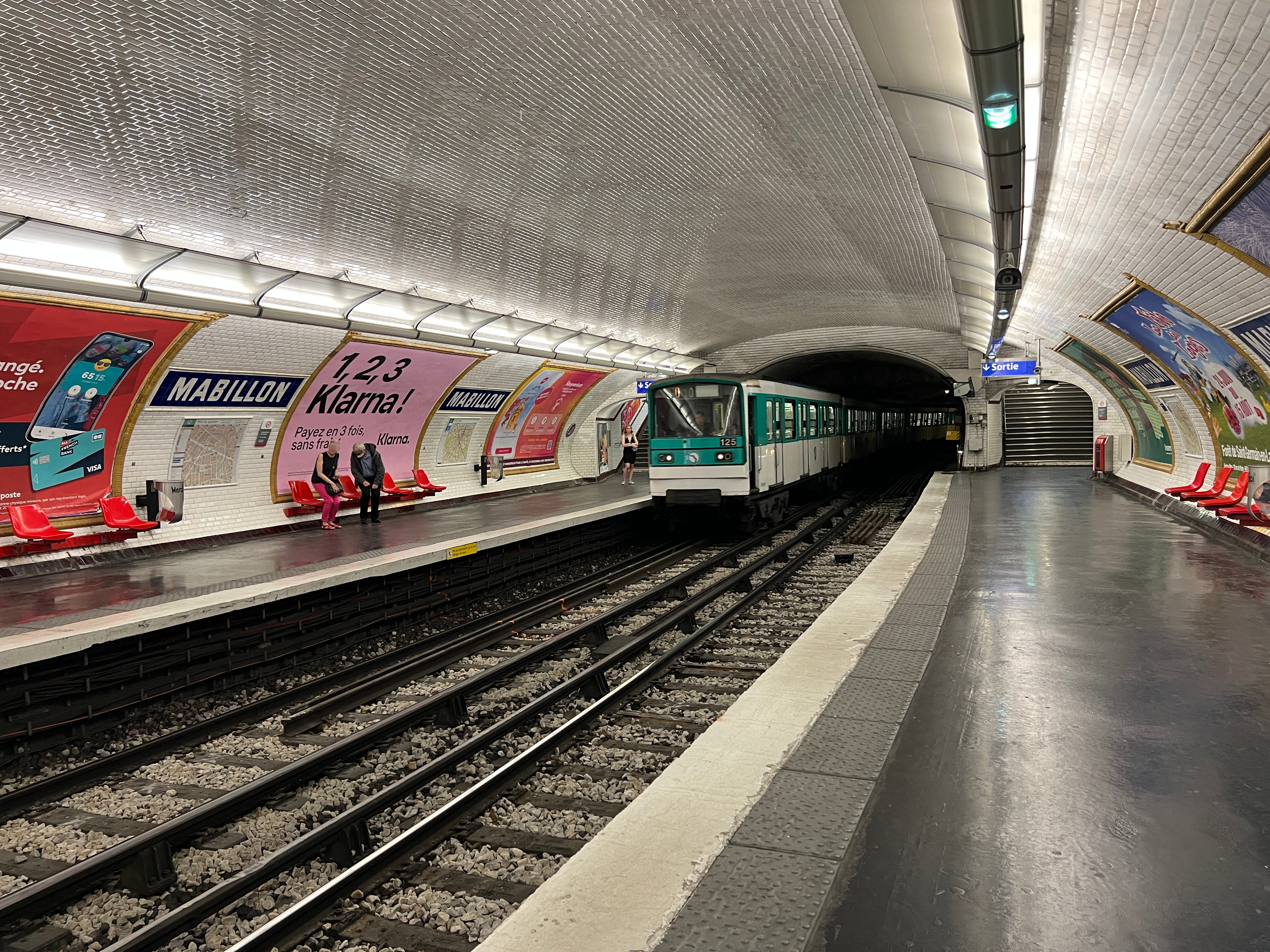
- MF 67 at Mabillon

General information
- Location: 6th arrondissement of Paris; Île-de-France; France
- Coordinates: 48°51′10″N 2°20′07″E
- System: Paris Métro station
- Owner: RATP
- Operator: RATP
- Line: Paris Metro Paris Metro Line 10
- Platforms: 2 (2 side platforms)
- Tracks: 2

Construction
- Accessible: no

Other information
- Station code: 0214
- Fare zone: 1

History
- Opened: 10 March 1925

Passengers
- 1,195,051 (2021)

Services
Preceding station	Paris Metro	Following station
Sèvres–Babylone towards Boulogne–Pont de Saint-Cloud	Line 10	Odéon towards Gare d'Austerlitz
Location
- Location within Paris

Mabillon (French pronunciation: [mabijɔ̃]) is a station on line 10 of the Paris Metro, located at the heart of the Rive Gauche and the 6th arrondissement. It was named after the nearby street, rue Mabillon, which in turn was named after Jean Mabillon (1632–1707), a Benedictine monk and scholar, considered the founder of palaeography and diplomatics, who died nearby.

Although the station is in close proximity to Saint-Germain-des-Prés on line 4 (less than 100 metres away), there is no free transfer between the two stations.

== History ==
The station opened on 10 March 1925 as part of the line's extension from Croix-Rouge (a ghost station between Sèvres – Babylone and Mabillon, closed since World War II). It was the eastern terminus of the line until its extension to Odéon on 14 April 1926.

As part of the "Un métro + beau" programme by the RATP, the station's corridors and platform lighting were renovated and modernised on 21 July 2006.

In 2019, the station was used by 1,859,872 passengers, making it the 256th busiest of the Métro network out of 302 stations.

In 2020, the station was used by 839,743 passengers amidst the COVID-19 pandemic, making it the 262nd busiest of the Métro network out of 304 stations.

In 2021, the station was used by 1,195,051 passengers, making it the 262nd busiest of the Métro network out of 304 stations.

== Passenger services ==
=== Access ===
The station has two accesses:

- Access 1: rue de Montfaucon
- Access 2: rue du Four (an exit only ascending escalator)

=== Station layout ===
Street Level
B1	Mezzanine
Platform level	Side platform, doors will open on the right
Platform level	Westbound	← toward Boulogne – Pont de Saint-Cloud (Sèvres – Babylone)
Platform level	Eastbound	toward Gare d'Austerlitz (Odéon) →
Platform level	Side platform, doors will open on the right

=== Platforms ===
The station has a standard configuration with 2 tracks surrounded by 2 side platforms.

=== Other connections ===
The station is also served by lines 63, 70, 86, 87, and 96 of the RATP bus network, and at night, by lines N12 and N13 of the Noctilien bus network.

== Nearby ==
- Église Saint-Sulpice
- Luxembourg Palace
- Musée national Eugène Delacroix
- Place d'Acadie

== Gallery ==
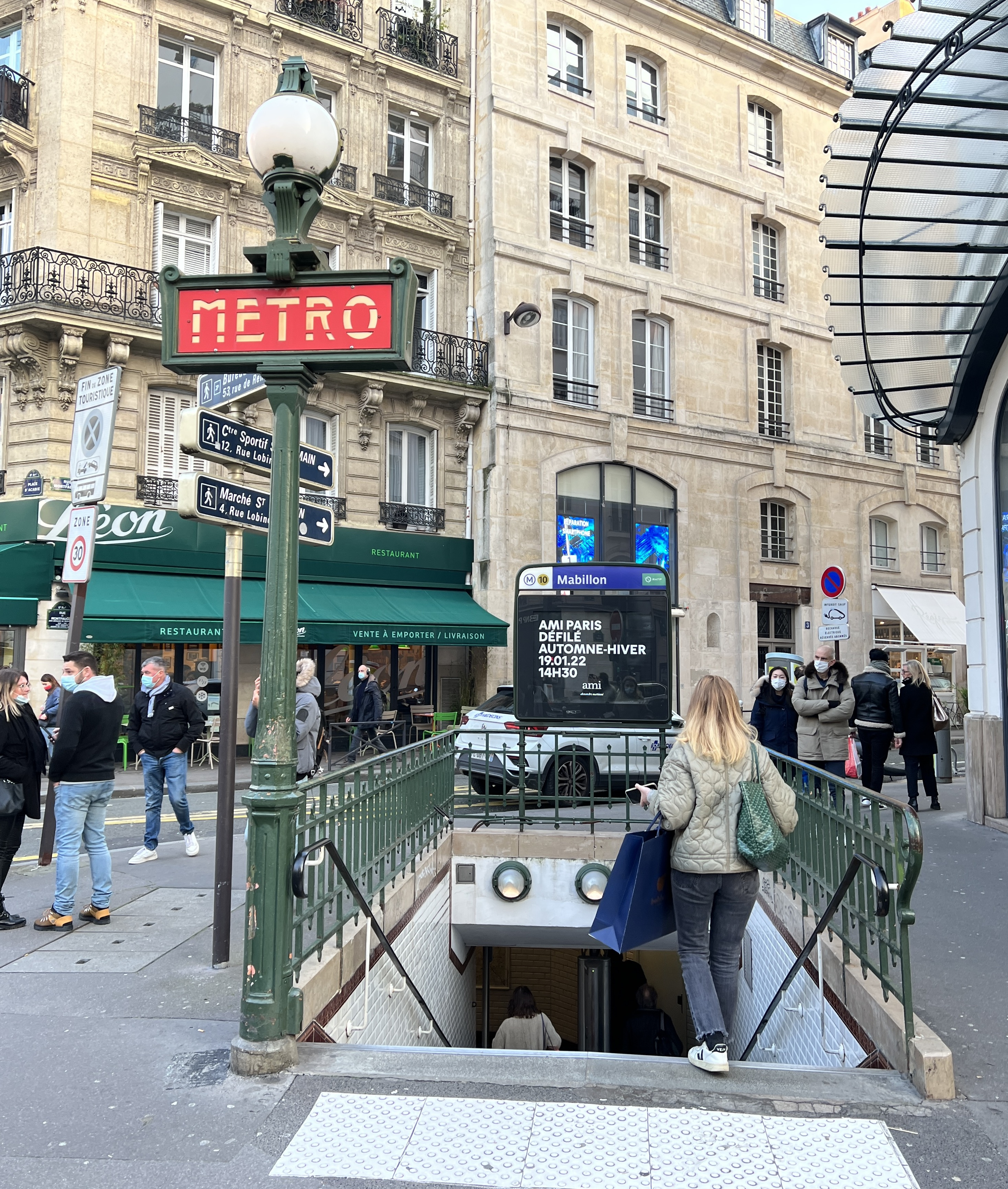
Access 1

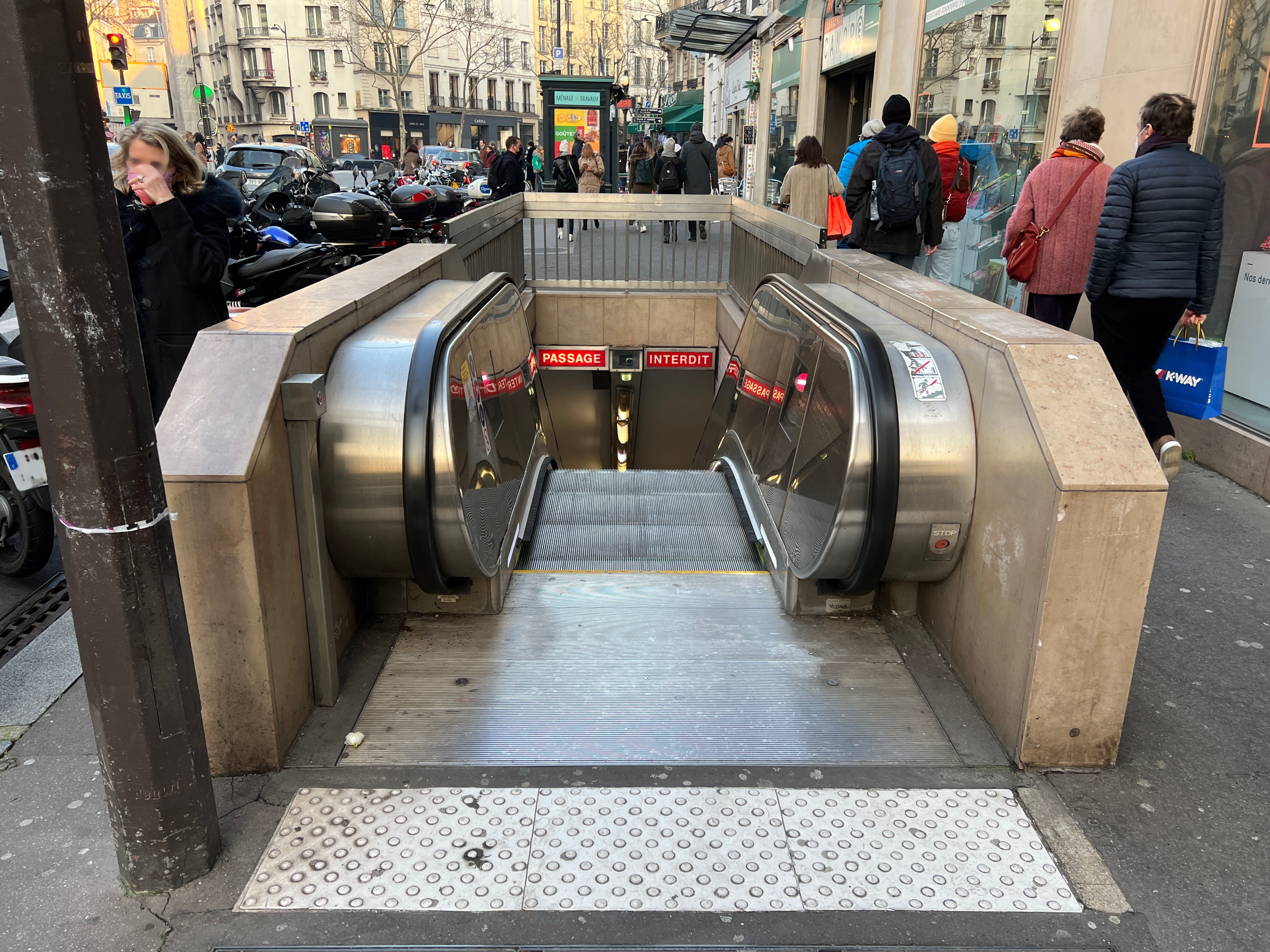
Access 2

== Bibliography ==
- Roland, Gérard (2003). Stations de métro. D’Abbesses à Wagram. Éditions Bonneton.
