= Place d'Acadie =

Square in Paris, France

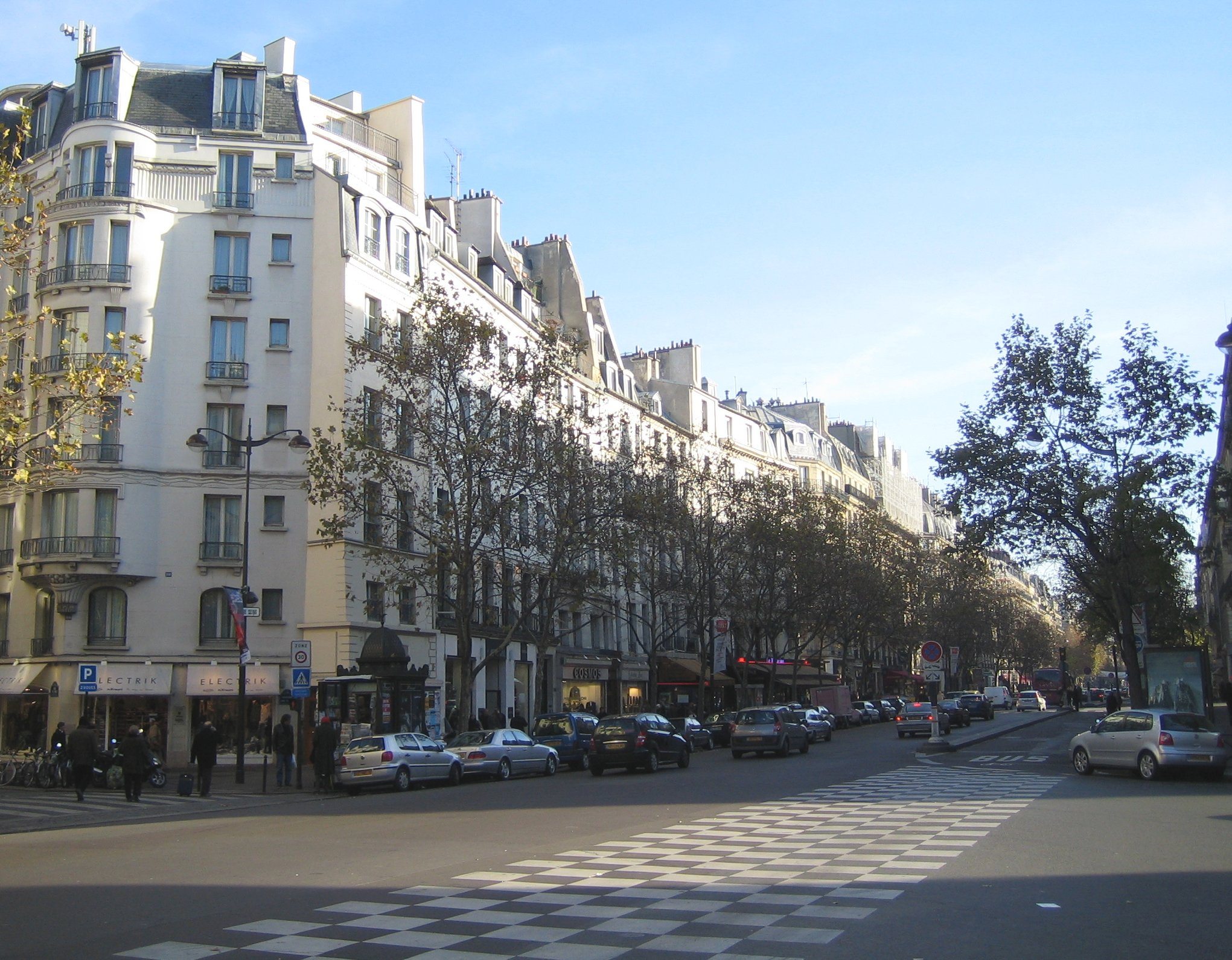
- The intersection of the Boulevard; Saint-Germain and the Rue de Buci

- Location within Paris
- Length: 43 m (141 ft)
- Width: 16 m (52 ft)
- Arrondissement: 6th
- Quarter: Odéon; Saint-Germain-des-Prés
- Coordinates: 48°51′11″N 2°20′09″E
- From: 135, Boulevard Saint-Germain
- To: 156, Boulevard Saint-Germain

Construction
- Completed: 1984
- Denomination: Acadie

The Place d’Acadie is a public square in the 6th arrondissement of Paris, dedicated on 8 March 1984 by the mayor of Paris, Jacques Chirac, and by the president of an association called "Les Amitiés Acadiennes", Philippe Rossillon. It is located near the Mabillon metro station, where the Boulevard Saint-Germain intersects the Rue du Four and the Rue de Buci.

The square takes its name from the old French North-American territory of Acadia that was once part of New France. Acadia existed in what is now called New Brunswick and Nova Scotia, provinces of Canada that are, today, home to a large number of francophone Canadians. Acadia is represented, in international forums on the French-speaking world's culture (francophonie), by the Province of New Brunswick.

The Acadian flag created in 1884

Dedication of this square in Paris was meant to mark the hundredth anniversary of the Acadian flag in 1884 in connection with the second National Acadian Convention. It was also the 380th anniversary of the first French outpost in Acadia in 1604.

The Place d’Acadie is located only about a hundred metres from another place celebrating French culture in North America, the Place du Québec.

== Metro station ==
The Place d'Acadie is:

Located near the Metro station: Mabillon.

It is served by line 10.

== See also ==
- Acadiana
- Brayon
- Cajun
- Foire Brayonne
- French colonization of the Americas
- French in Canada
- French in the United States
- Le Grand Dérangement
- Great Upheaval
- Republic of Madawaska
