= Odéon station =

Metro station in Paris, France

Odéon
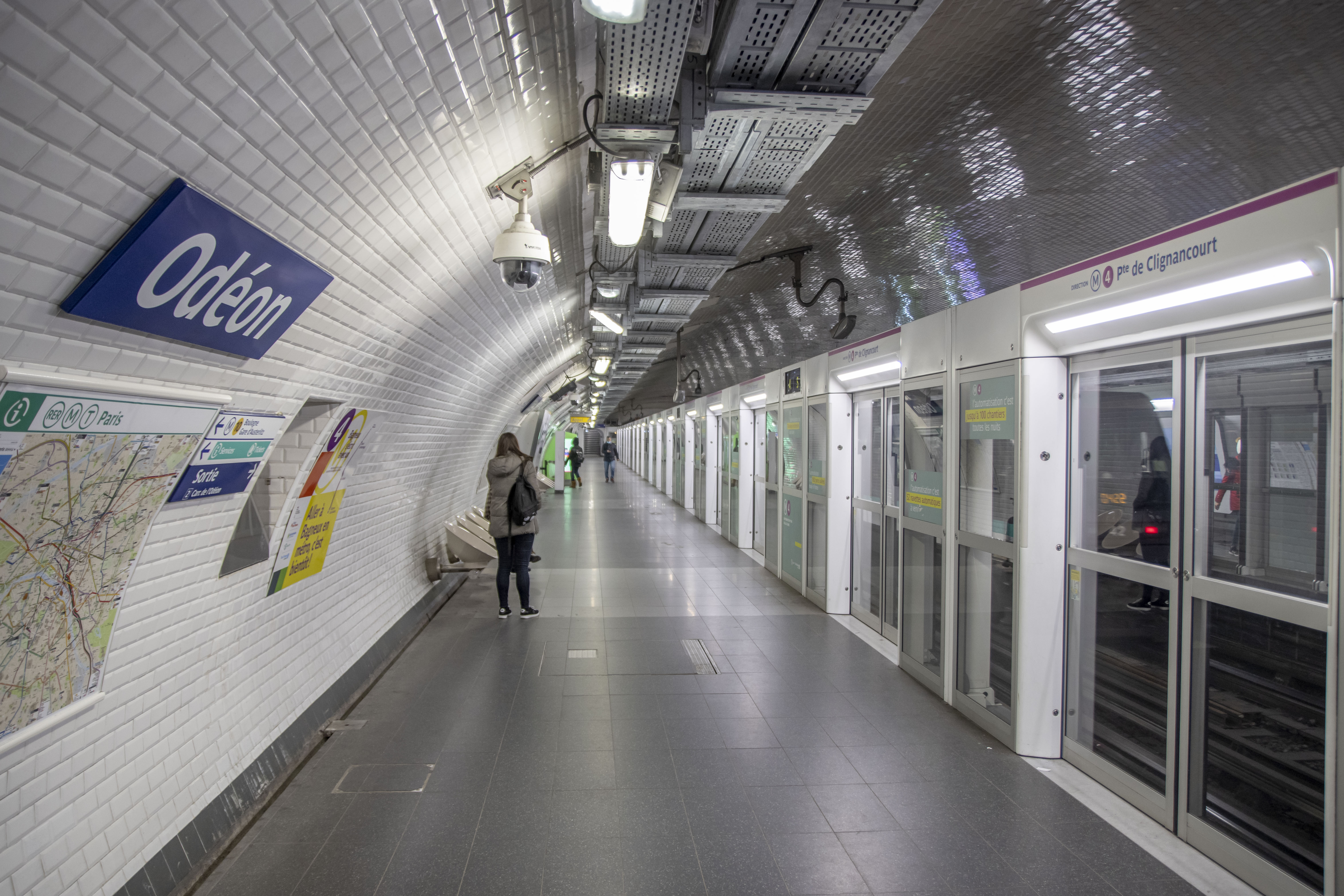
- Line 4 platforms at Odéon after the installation of platform screen doors

General information
- Location: Carrefour de l'Odéon; 93, boul. Saint-Germain; 108, boul. Saint-Germain; 6th arrondissement of Paris; Île-de-France; France
- Coordinates: 48°51′07″N 2°20′20″E
- Owner: RATP
- Operator: RATP
- Line: Paris Metro Paris Metro Line 4 Paris Metro Line 10
- Platforms: 4 (4 side platforms)
- Tracks: 4

Construction
- Accessible: no

Other information
- Station code: 0104
- Fare zone: 1

History
- Opened: 9 January 1910

Passengers
- 3,478,491 (2021)

Services
Preceding station	Paris Metro	Following station
Saint-Germain-des-Prés towards Bagneux–Lucie Aubrac	Line 4	Saint-Michel towards Porte de Clignancourt
Mabillon towards Boulogne–Pont de Saint-Cloud	Line 10	Cluny–La Sorbonne towards Gare d'Austerlitz
Location
- Location within Paris

Odéon (French: [ɔdeɔ̃]) is a station on lines 4 and 10 of the Paris Métro. It is located in the 6th arrondissement, on the Rive Gauche. It is named after the nearby Odéon-Théâtre de l'Europe and is located under the Carrefour de l'Odéon, in the 6th arrondissement of Paris.

== History ==
The station was opened on 9 January 1910 as part of the connecting section of line 4 under the Seine between Châtelet and Raspail. It was one of the many stations on line 4 that were flooded during the Great Flood of Paris in 1910, interrupting service for several weeks

Line 10's platforms opened on 14 February 1926 as part of the line's extension from Mabillon. It served as its eastern terminus until its extension to Place d'Italie (now on line 7) on 15 February 1930.

Between October 1966 and October 1967, like most stations on line 4, its platforms were lengthened to 90 metres to cater for six-car trains due to the increased traffic on the line. The walls of the platform were clad in a metal casing to improve the general appearance of the station.

As part of the "Un métro + beau" programme by the RATP, the station's corridors, lighting, as well as platforms of line 4 were renovated on 7 October 2008, removing the metal cladding on the platforms of line 4.

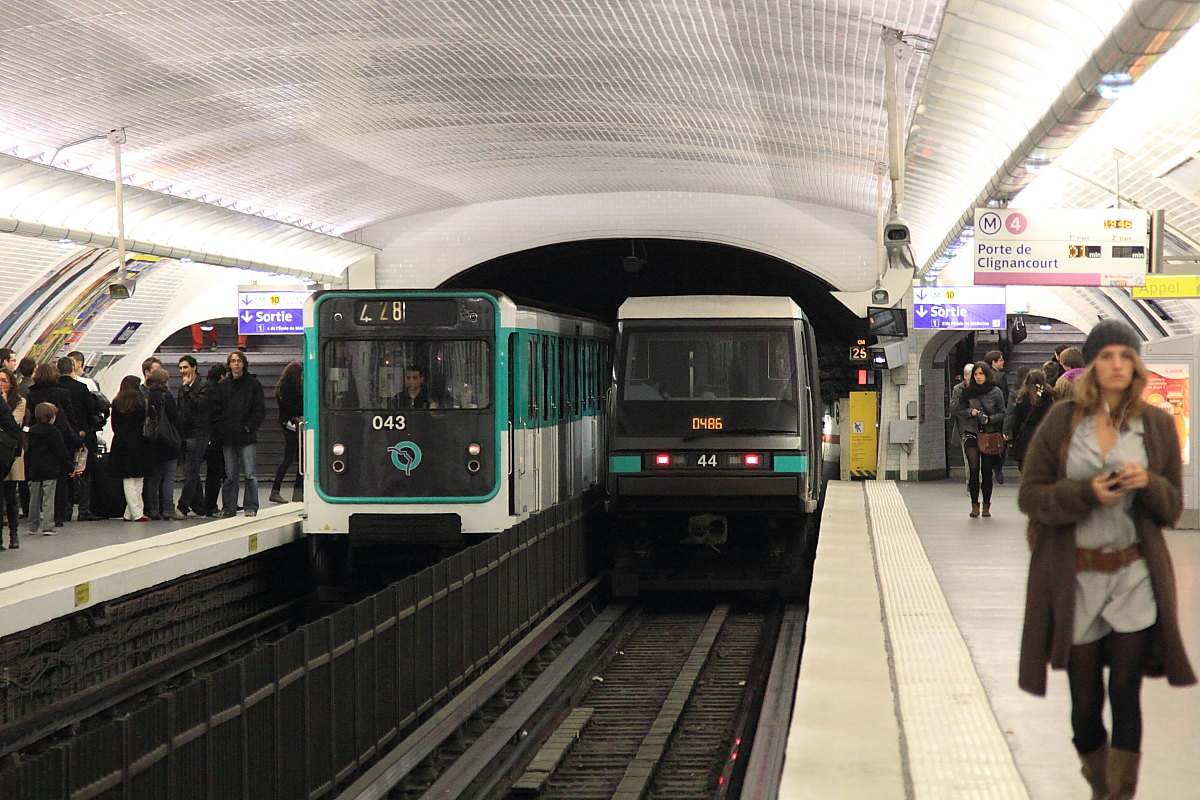
MP 59 and MP 89 rolling stock on line 4, before the installation of platform screen doors, on the day of transition between the two rolling stock

As part of the automation of line 4, the platforms of line 4 were partially renovated and modernised. Its platform levels were raised to accommodate the installation of platform screen doors which took place from July to August 2019. This was in addition to new lighting being installed, tiling the floor, and the installation of new seats.

In 2019, the station was used by 5,600,764 passengers, making it the 70th busiest of the Métro network out of 302 stations.

In 2020, the station was used by 2,412,888 passengers amidst the COVID-19 pandemic, making it the 91st busiest of the Métro network out of 304 stations.

In 2021, the station was used by 3,478,491 passengers, making it the 80th busiest of the Métro network out of 304 stations.

== Passenger services ==
=== Access ===
The station has four accesses:

- Access 1: rue de l'École de Médecine (with an ascending escalator)
- Access 2: Carrefour de l'Odéon
- Access 3: rue Danton
- Access 4: Boulevard Saint-Michel

=== Station layout ===
Street Level
B1	Mezzanine
Line 10 platforms	Side platform, doors will open on the right
Line 10 platforms	Westbound	← toward Boulogne – Pont de Saint-Cloud (Mabillon)
Line 10 platforms	Eastbound	toward Gare d'Austerlitz (Cluny – La Sorbonne) →
Line 10 platforms	Side platform, doors will open on the right
Line 4 platforms	Side platform, doors will open on the right
Line 4 platforms	Northbound	← toward Porte de Clignancourt (Saint-Michel)
Line 4 platforms	Southbound	toward Bagneux–Lucie Aubrac (Saint-Germain-des-Prés) →
Line 4 platforms	Side platform, doors will open on the right

=== Platforms ===
Both lines have a standard configuration with 2 tracks surrounded by 2 side platforms, although line 4's platforms have had platform screen doors installed since August 2019.

=== Other connections ===
The station is also served by lines 58, 63, 70, 86, 87, and 96 of the RATP bus network, and at night, by lines N12 and N13 of the Noctilien bus network.

== Nearby ==
- Luxembourg Palace
- Odéon-Théâtre de l'Europe

== Gallery ==
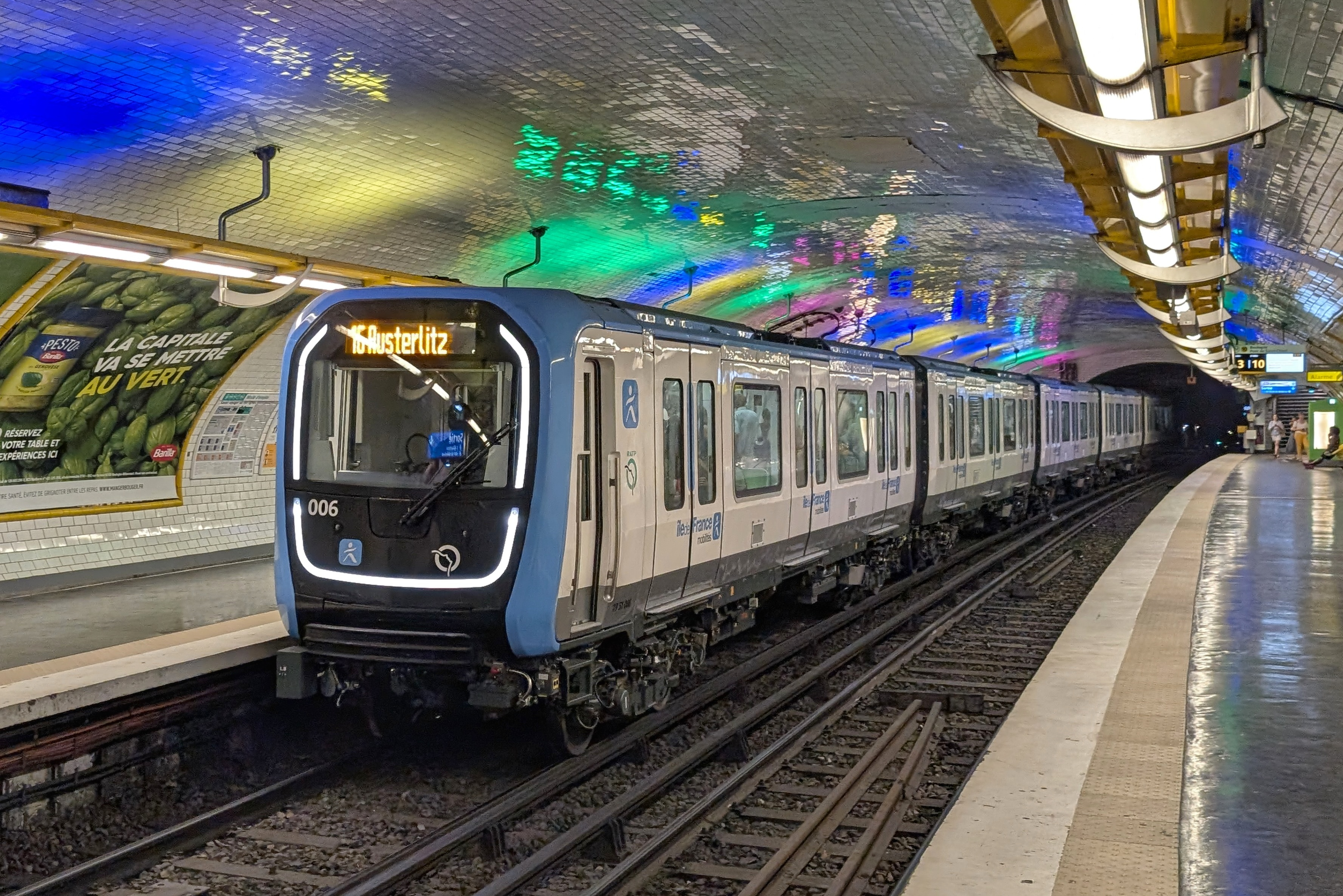
MF 19 on line 10 at Odéon

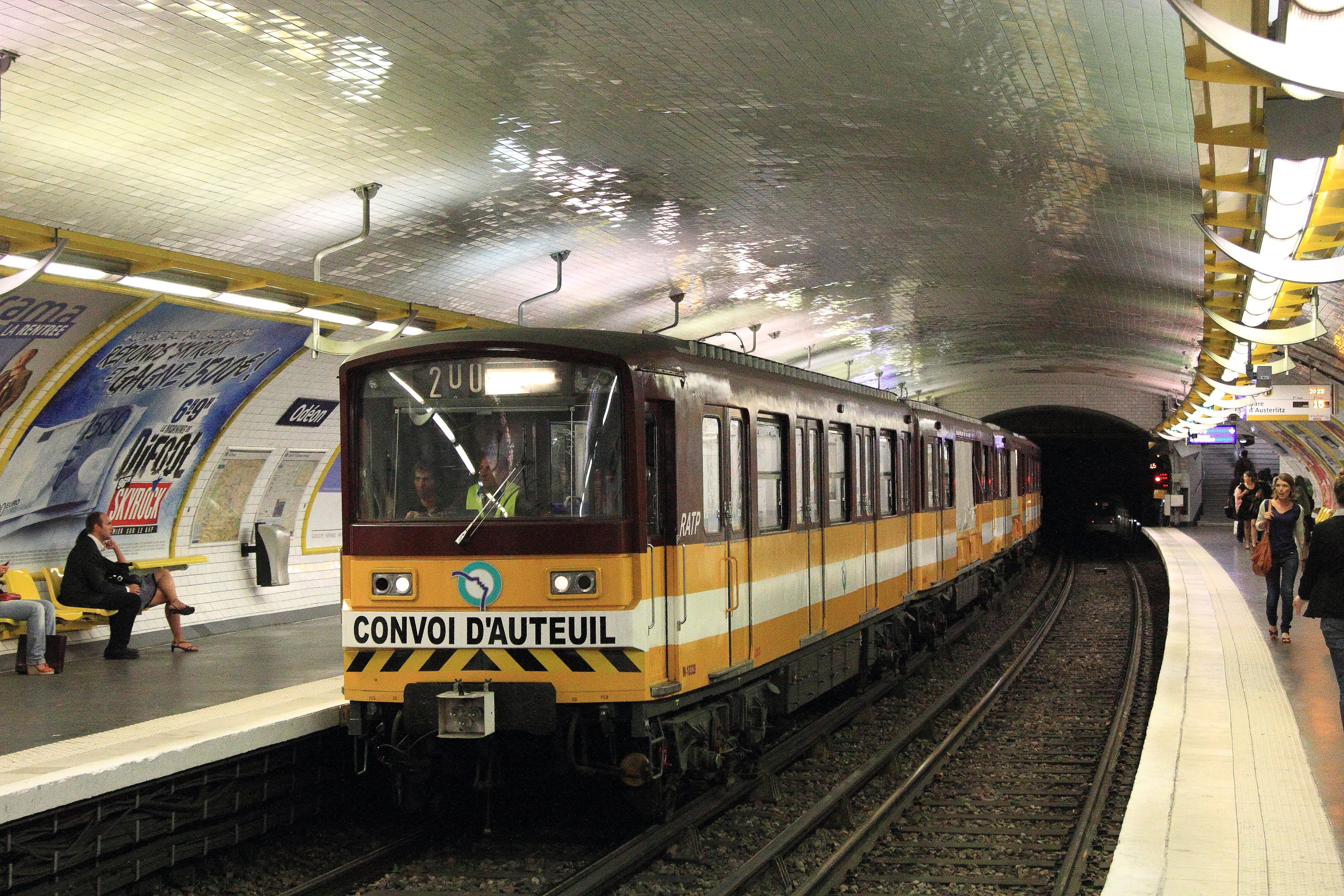
Maintenance train on line 10

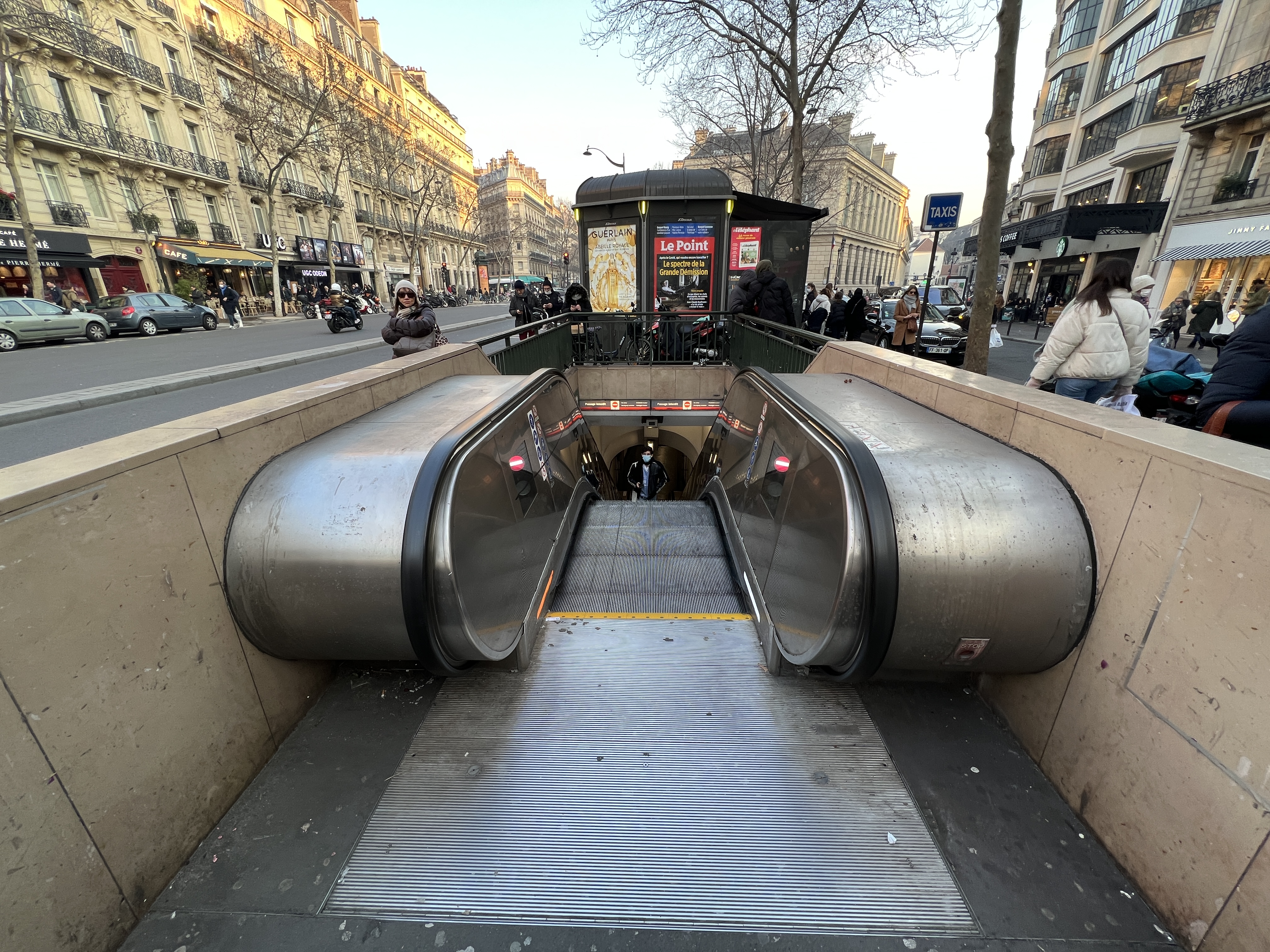
Access 1

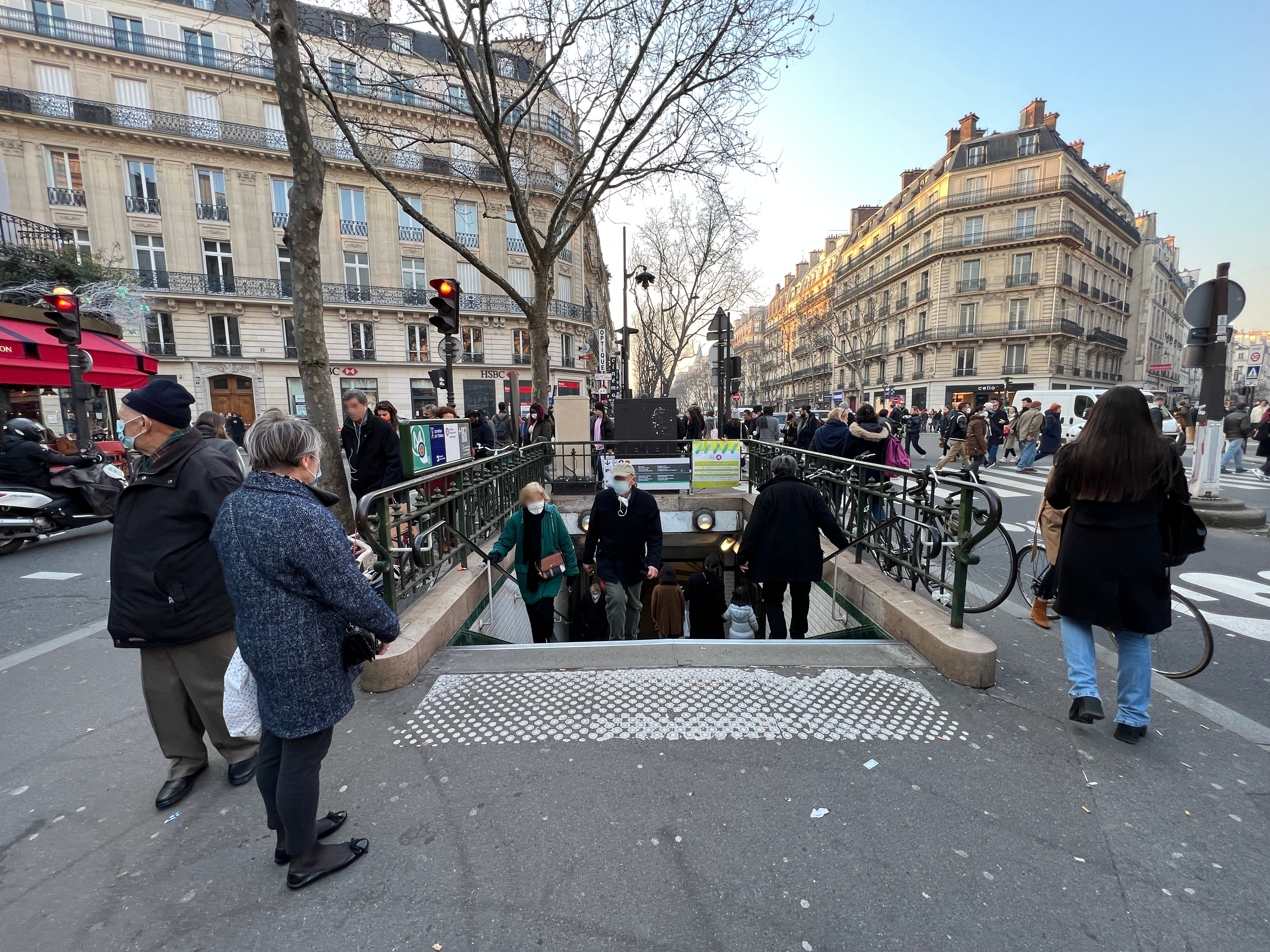
Access 2

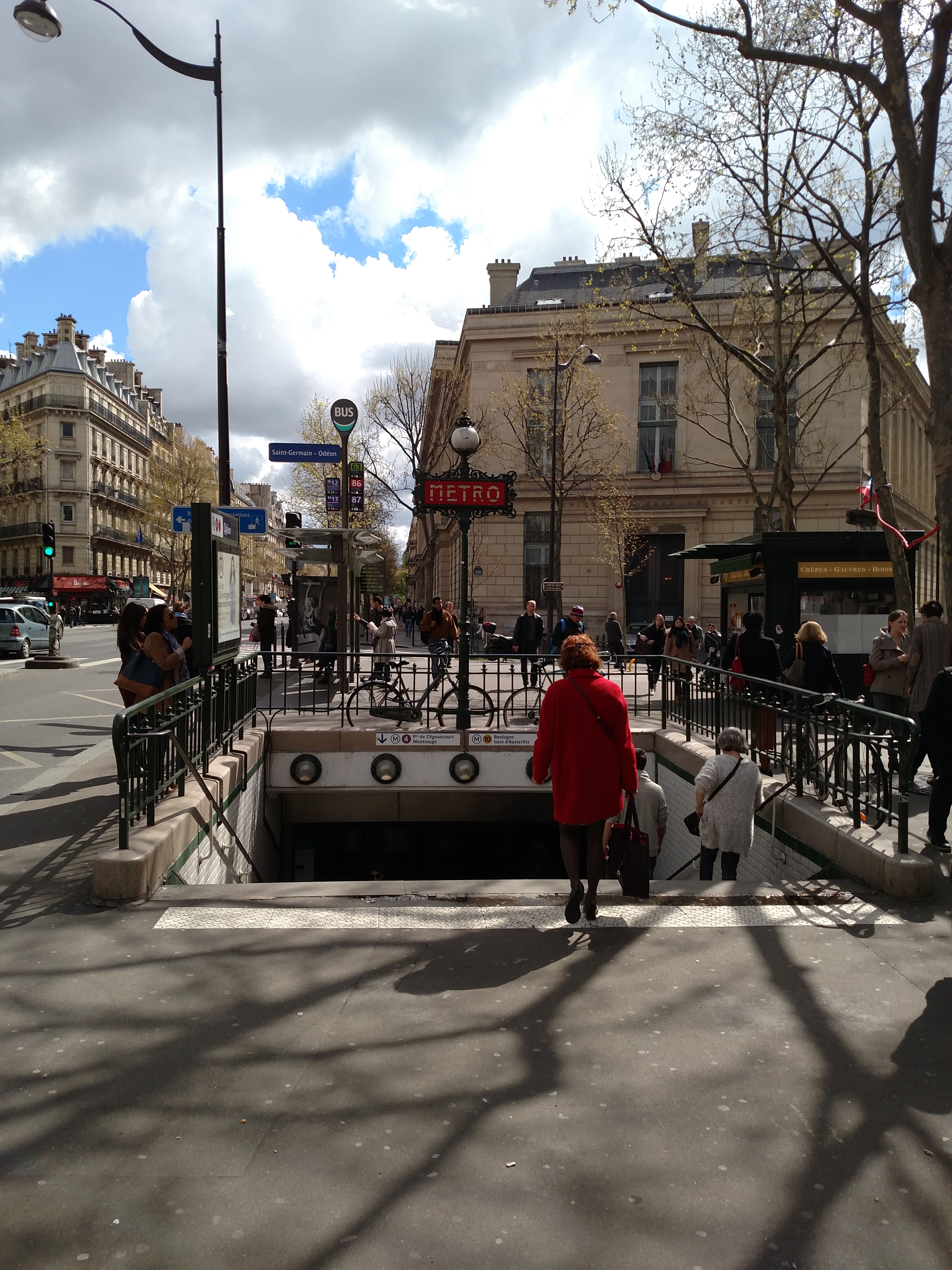
Access 3

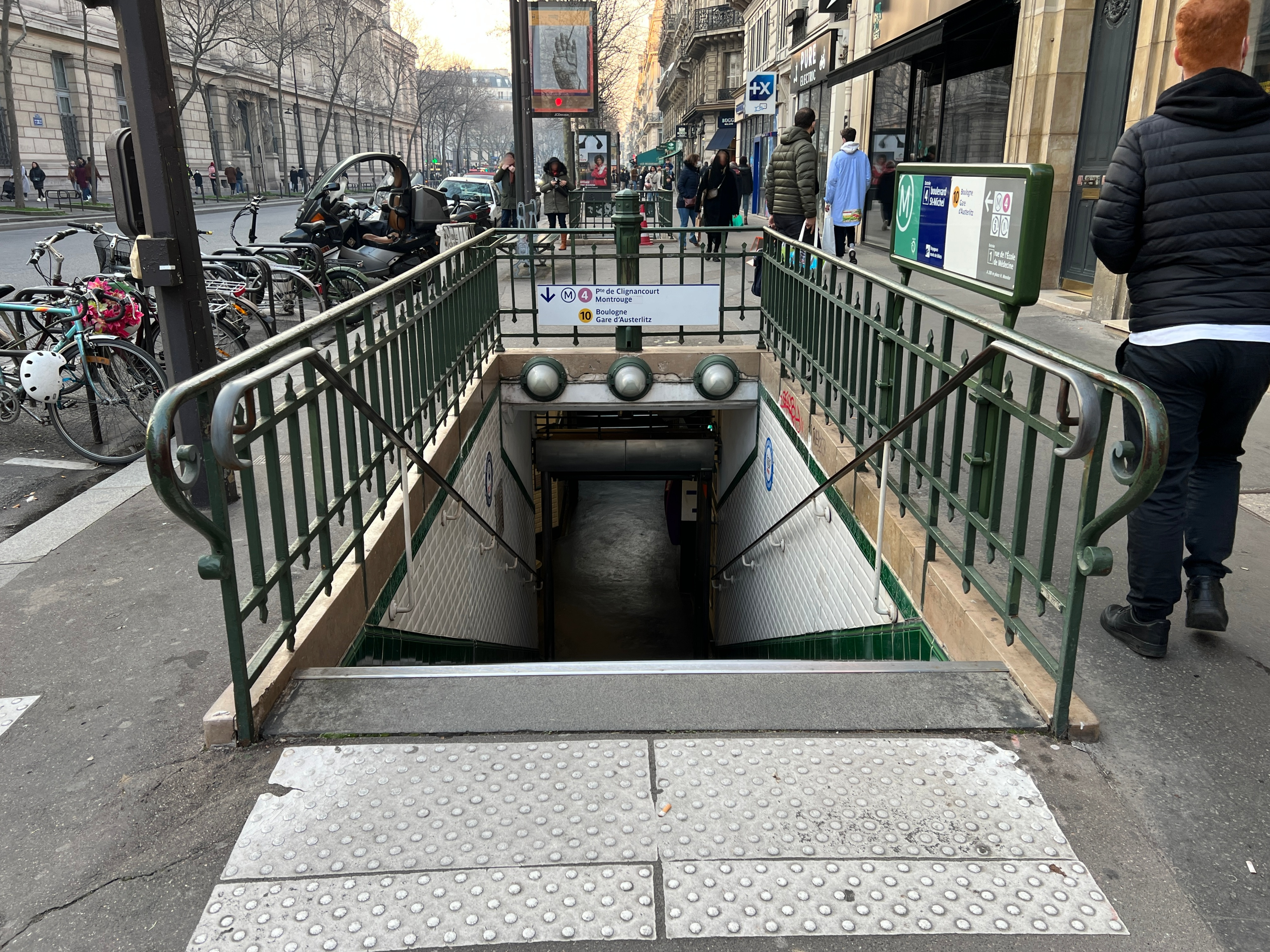
Access 4

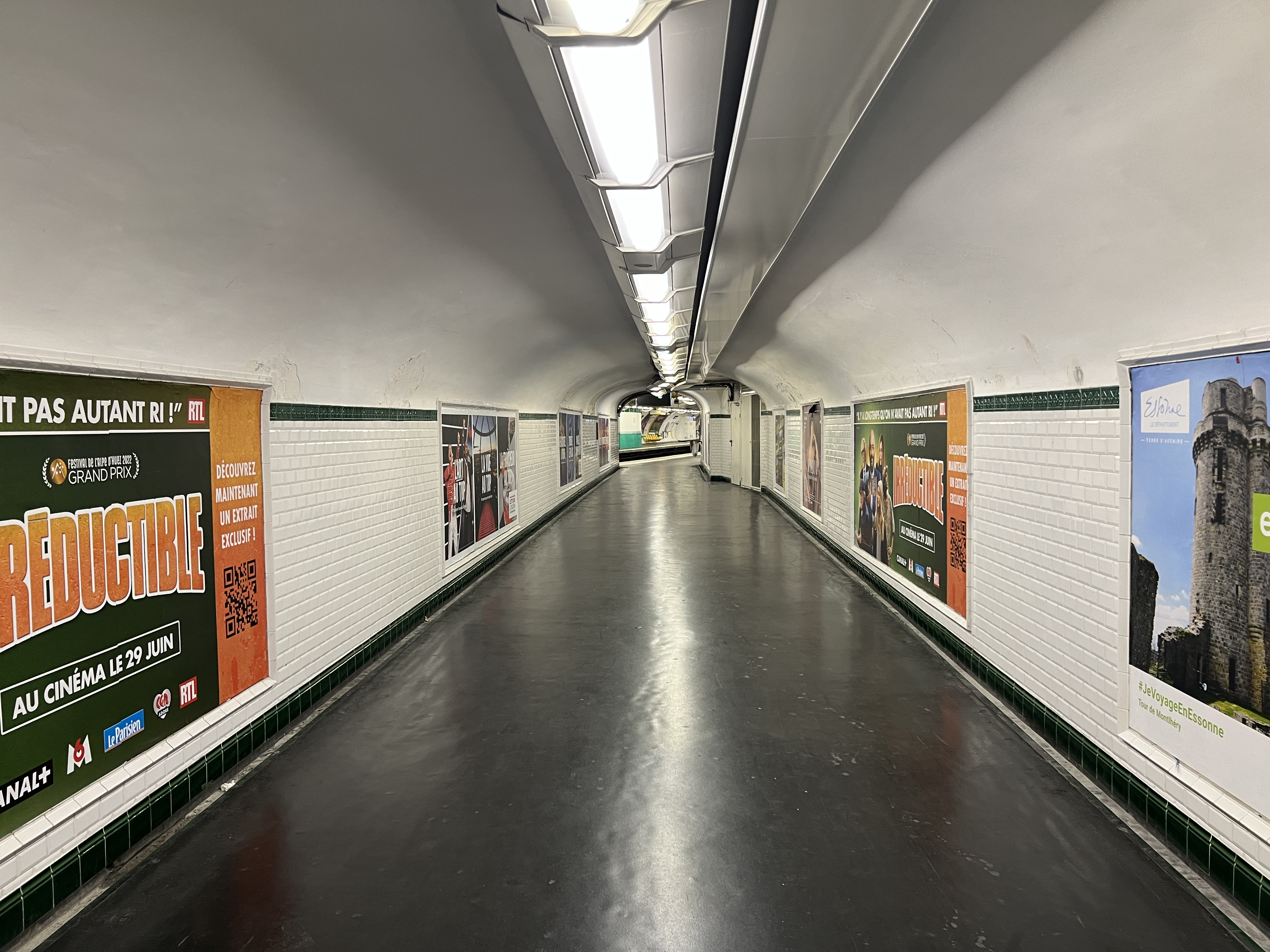
One of the corridors in the station

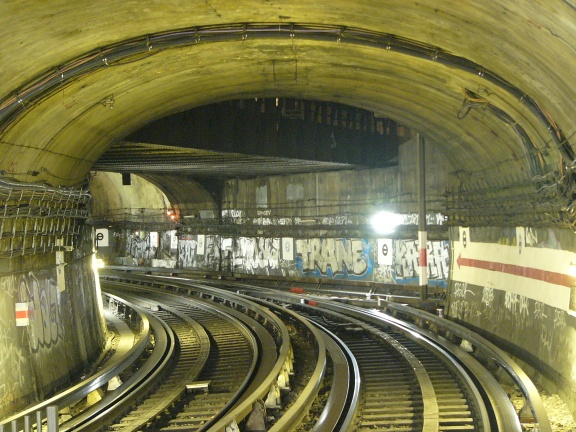
Connecting track between lines 4 and 10

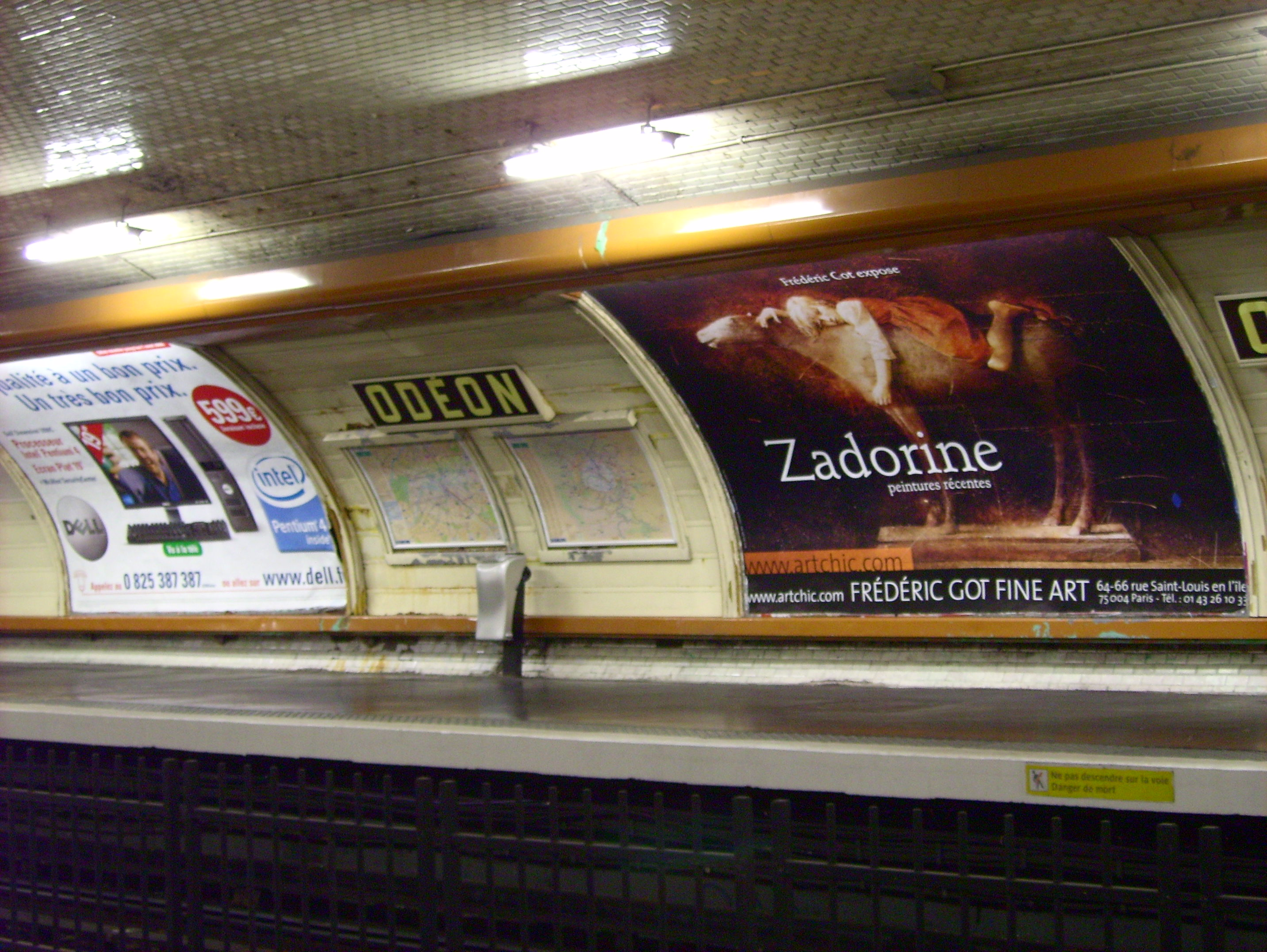
Original bodywork of the platforms on line 4
