= Sèvres–Babylone station =

Metro station in Paris, France

Sèvres–Babylone
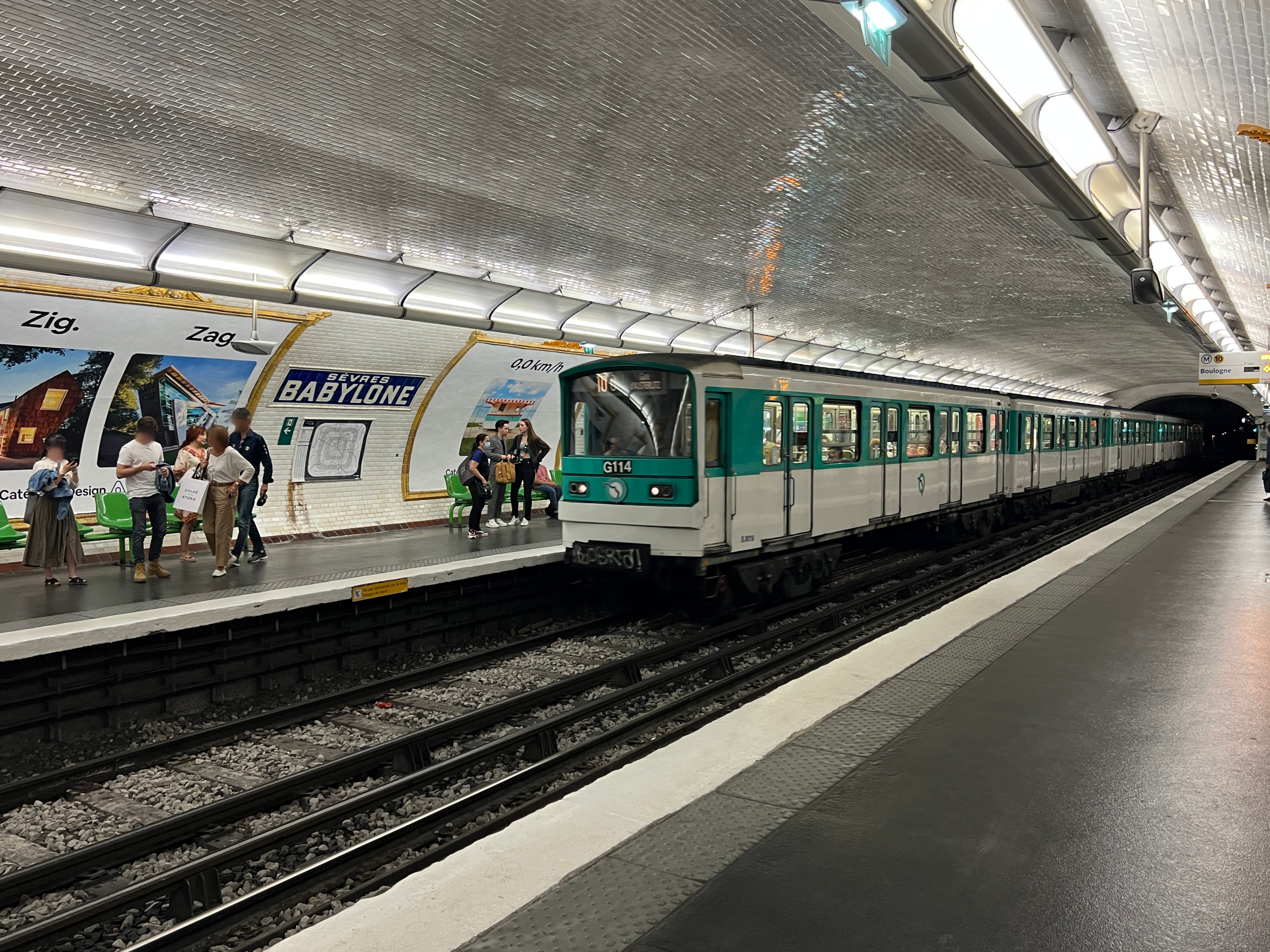
- MF 67 on line 10

General information
- Location: 6th and 7th arrondissement of Paris; Île-de-France; France
- Coordinates: 48°51′05″N 2°19′36″E
- System: Paris Métro station
- Owner: RATP
- Operator: RATP
- Line: Paris Metro Paris Metro Line 10 Paris Metro Line 12
- Platforms: 4 (4 side platforms)
- Tracks: 4

Construction
- Accessible: no

Other information
- Station code: 0209
- Fare zone: 1

History
- Opened: : 5 November 1910 : 30 December 1923
- Former names: Sèvres–Croix-Rouge (1910–1923)

Passengers
- 3,392,504 (2021)

Services
| Preceding station | Paris Metro | Following station |
|---|---|---|
| Vaneau towards Boulogne–Pont de Saint-Cloud | Line 10 | Mabillon towards Gare d'Austerlitz |
| Rennes towards Mairie d'Issy | Line 12 | Rue du Bac towards Mairie d'Aubervilliers |
Location
- Location within Paris

Sèvres–Babylone (French pronunciation: [sɛvʁ(ə) babilɔn]) is a station on Lines 10 and 12 of the Paris Métro. It is located at the intersection of Boulevard Raspail and rue de Sèvres, on the border of the 6th and 7th arrondissements. Rue de Sèvres boasts two flagship Paris fashion stores: Le Bon Marché at number 22 and Hermès at number 17.

== History ==
On 5 November 1910, line 10's station opened by the Compagnie du chemin de fer métropolitain de Paris (CMP) as part of the first section of the Ligne circulaire intérieure (inner circular line) from Invalides (now on line 13) to Croix-Rouge (a ghost station east of Sèvres–Babylone, closed since World War II).

Line 12's station opened on 30 November 1923 as part of the original section of the Nord-Sud Company's line A between Porte de Versailles and Notre-Dame-de-Lorette. It was then named Sèvres–Croix-Rouge, after the nearby rue de Sèvres, a road in which in medieval times ran from Paris to Sèvres, as well as the nearby carrefour de la Croix-Rouge (today known as place Michel-Debré).

Initially, line 10's station was supposed to be named Babylone (after the nearby rue de Babylone, named in 1673 after the Catholic Bishop of Babylon) while line A's station was still named Sèvres–Croix-Rouge. However, shortly before the opening of line 10, the city forced the two companies to consolidate it into a single station with it adopting a common name, Sèvres–Babylone, as it is still known as today. These circumstances resulted in the peculiar signages at the station; the signages of line 10 read Sèvres-Babylone (emphasising Babylone) whereas that of line A read Sèvres-Babylone (emphasising Sèvres).

On 27 March 1931, line A became line 12 when It was taken over by the Compagnie du chemin de fer métropolitain de Paris (CMP), incorporating it into the Paris Métro.

As part of the "Un métro + beau" programme by the RATP, the station's corridors were renovated and modernised on 21 October 2005.

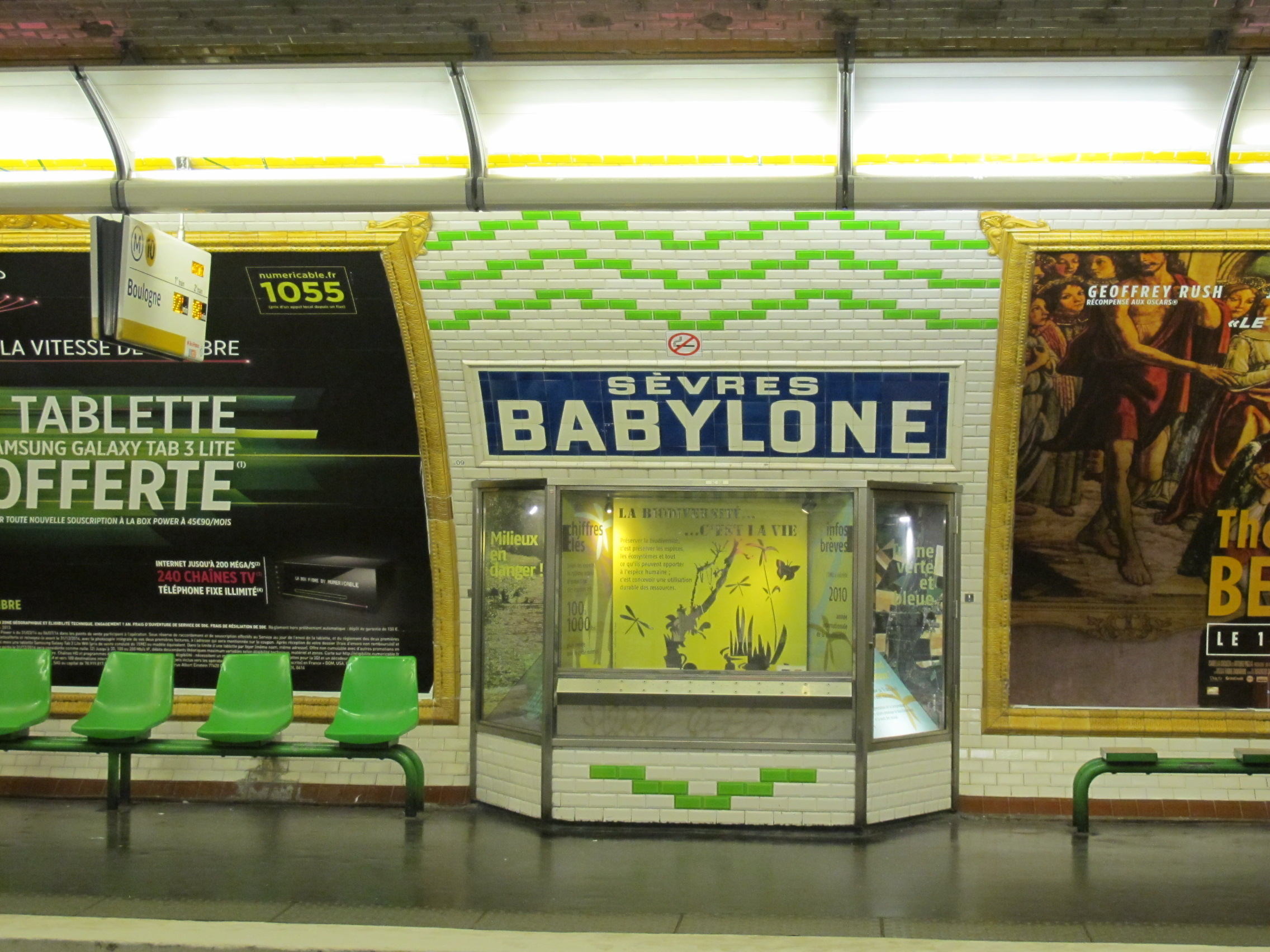
Former exhibition on the platforms of line 10, since removed.

Until 2008, line 10's platforms featured an exhibition on ecology, with showcases on waste recycling, renewable energy, and the consumption of water and electricity around the world. It was then replaced with panels that related specifically to the commitments of the Grenelle de l'environnement, with key points of public policy on environmentalism and sustainable development. It was however, removed at the end of 2015, with the green and yellow tiles above the display cases replaced with white tiles, putting an end to the original decoration of the platforms.

In 2019, the station was used by 5,037,509 passengers, making it the 80th busiest of the Métro network out of 302 stations.

In 2020, the station was used by 2,441,636 passengers amidst the COVID-19 pandemic, making it the 90th busiest of the Métro network out of 304 stations.

In 2021, the station was used by 3,392,504 passengers, making it the 88th busiest of the Métro network out of 304 stations.

== Passenger services ==
=== Access ===
The station has three accesses:

- Access 1: rue de Sèvres
- Access 2: rue Velpeau Le Bon Marché
- Access 3: Boulevard Raspail (with an ascending escalator)

=== Station layout ===
Street Level
| B1 | Mezzanine |
| Line 12 platforms | Side platform, doors will open on the right |
| Line 12 platforms | Southbound | ← toward Mairie d'Issy (Rennes) |
| Line 12 platforms | Northbound | toward Mairie d'Aubervilliers (Rue du Bac) → |
| Line 12 platforms | Side platform, doors will open on the right |
| Line 10 platforms | Side platform, doors will open on the right |
| Line 10 platforms | Westbound | ← toward Boulogne–Pont de Saint-Cloud (Vaneau) |
| Line 10 platforms | Eastbound | toward Gare d'Austerlitz (Mabillon) → |
| Line 10 platforms | Side platform, doors will open on the right |

=== Platforms ===
Both lines have a standard configuration with 2 tracks surrounded by 2 side platforms although the lower portion of the side walls on line 12's platforms are vertical instead of elliptical, as with the other stations constructed by the Nord-Sud company (today on lines 12 and 13).

=== Other connections ===
The station is also served by lines 63, 68, 70, 83, 84, 86, and 94 of the RATP bus network.

== Nearby ==
- Hôtel Lutetia
- Le Bon Marché
- Prépa ISP
- Sciences Po

== Gallery ==
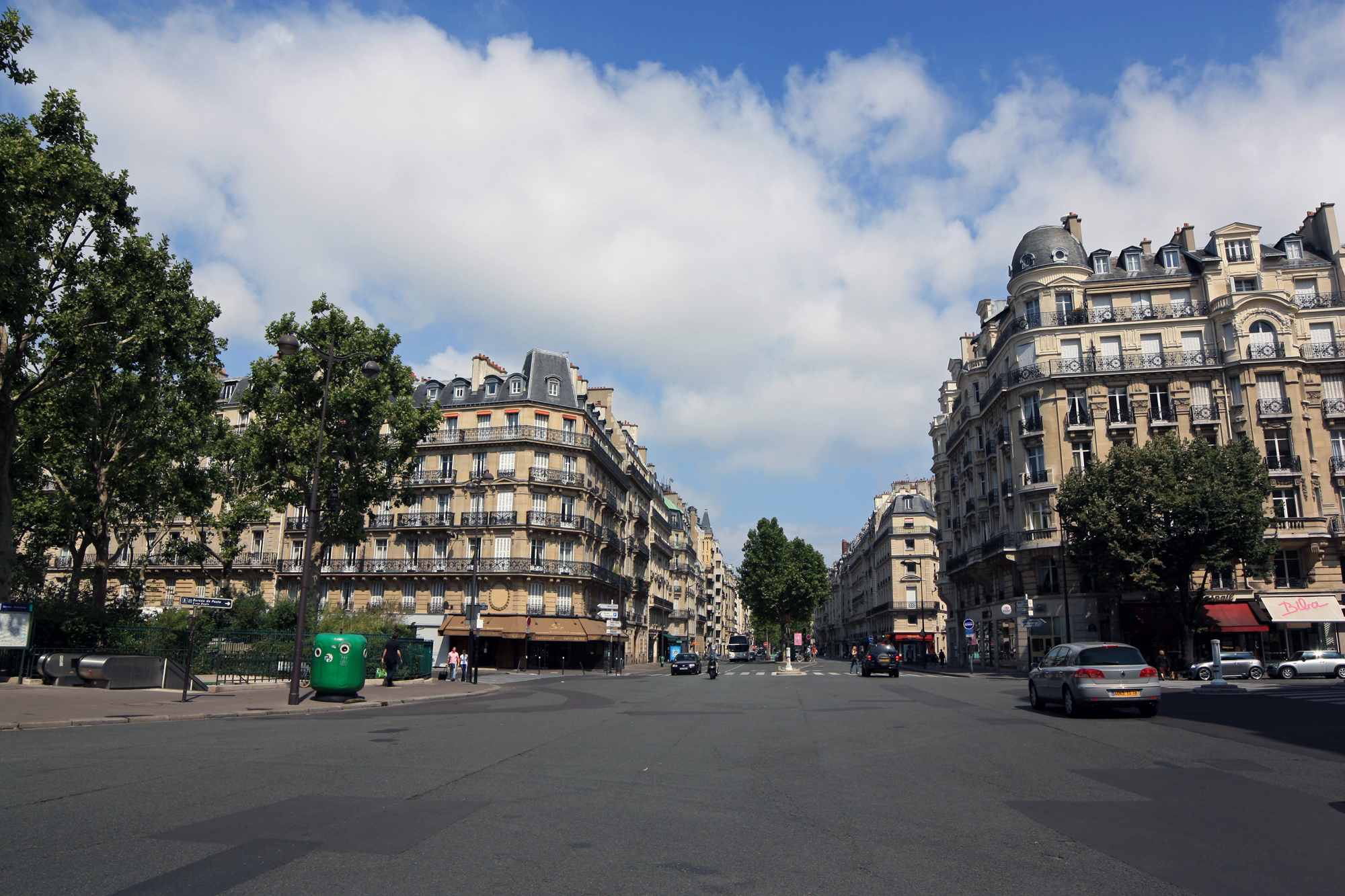
Boulevard Raspail crossing rue de Sèvres and rue de Babylone. The station is on the left.

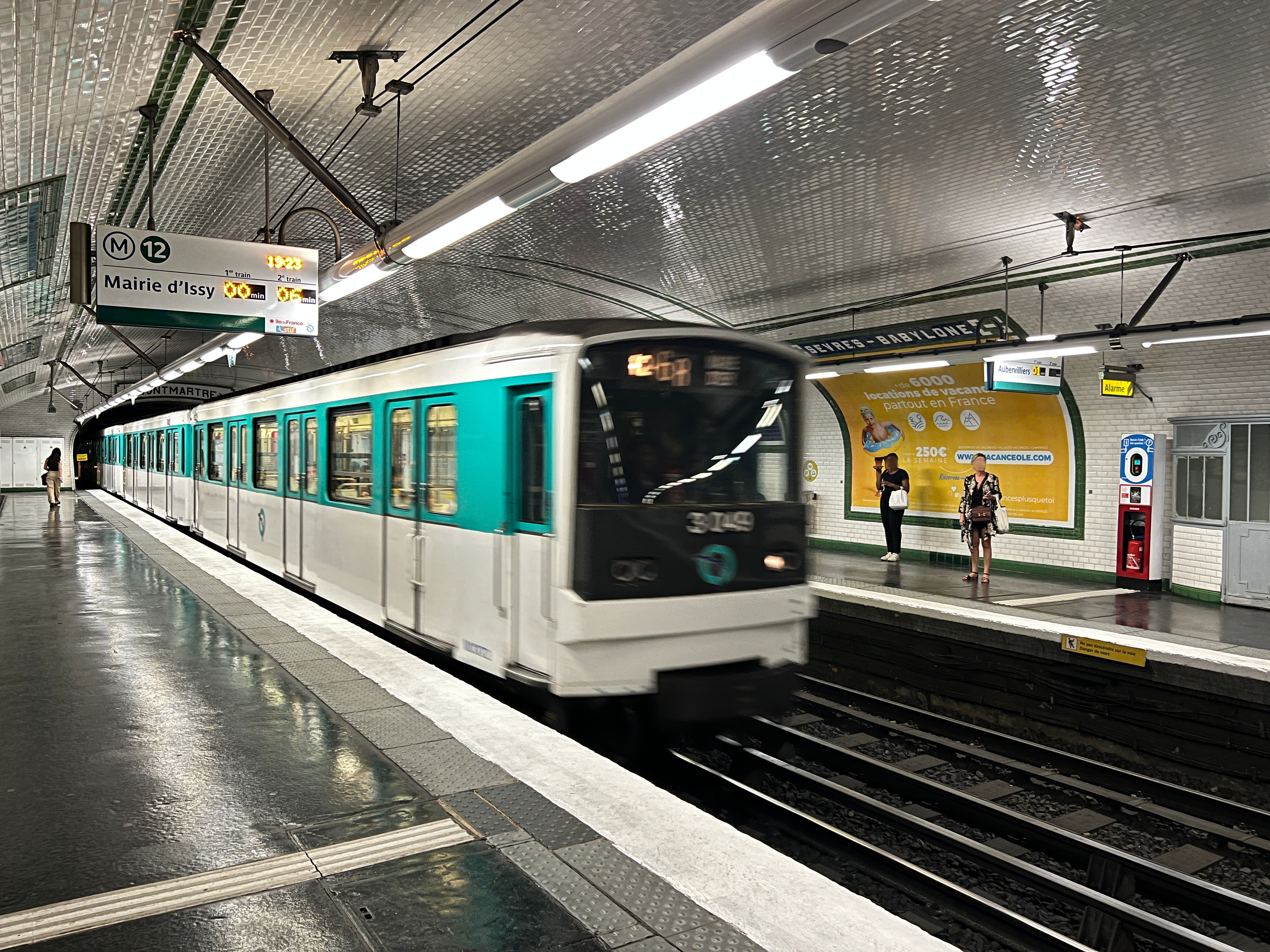
MF 67 on line 12

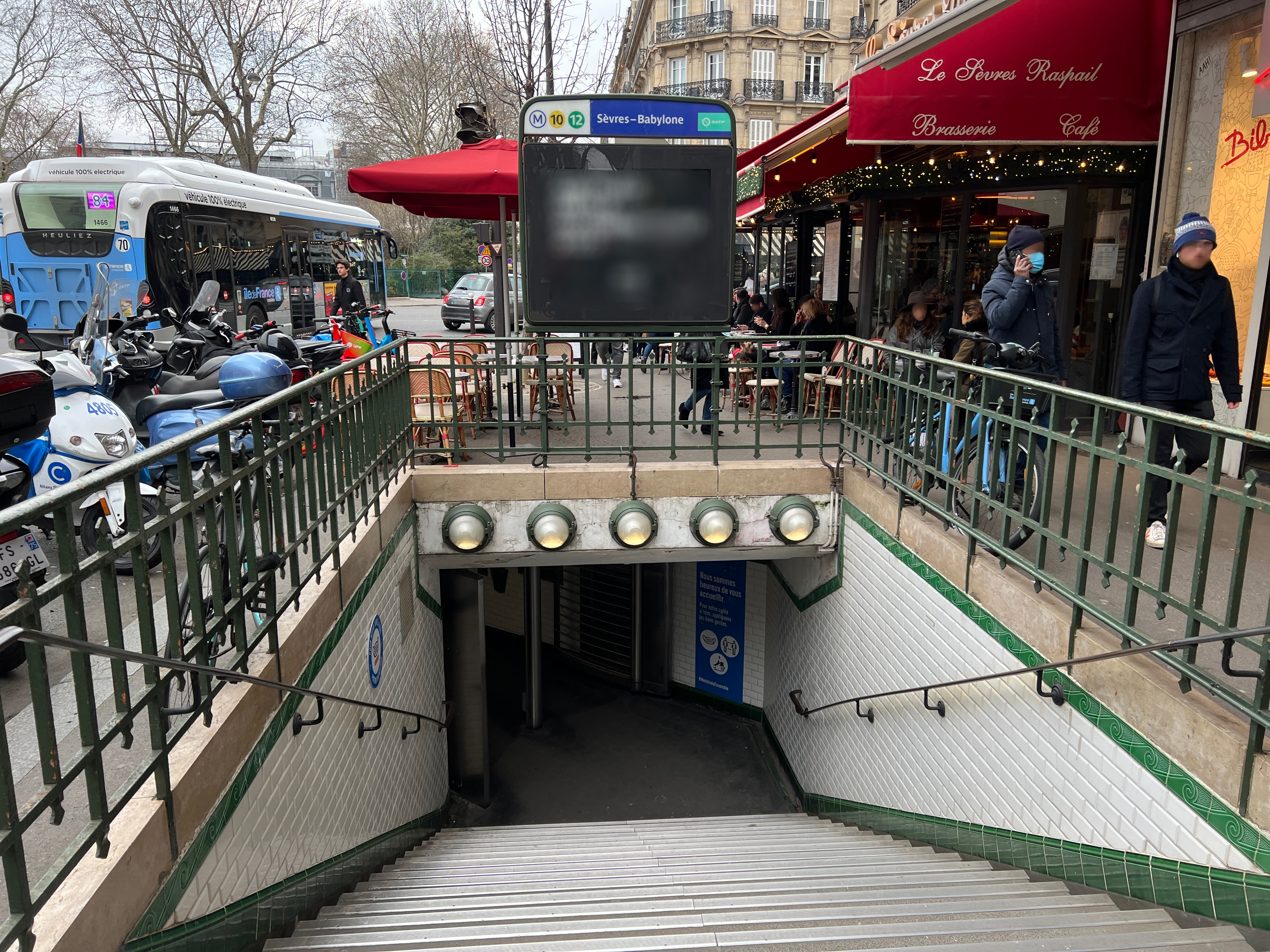
Access 1

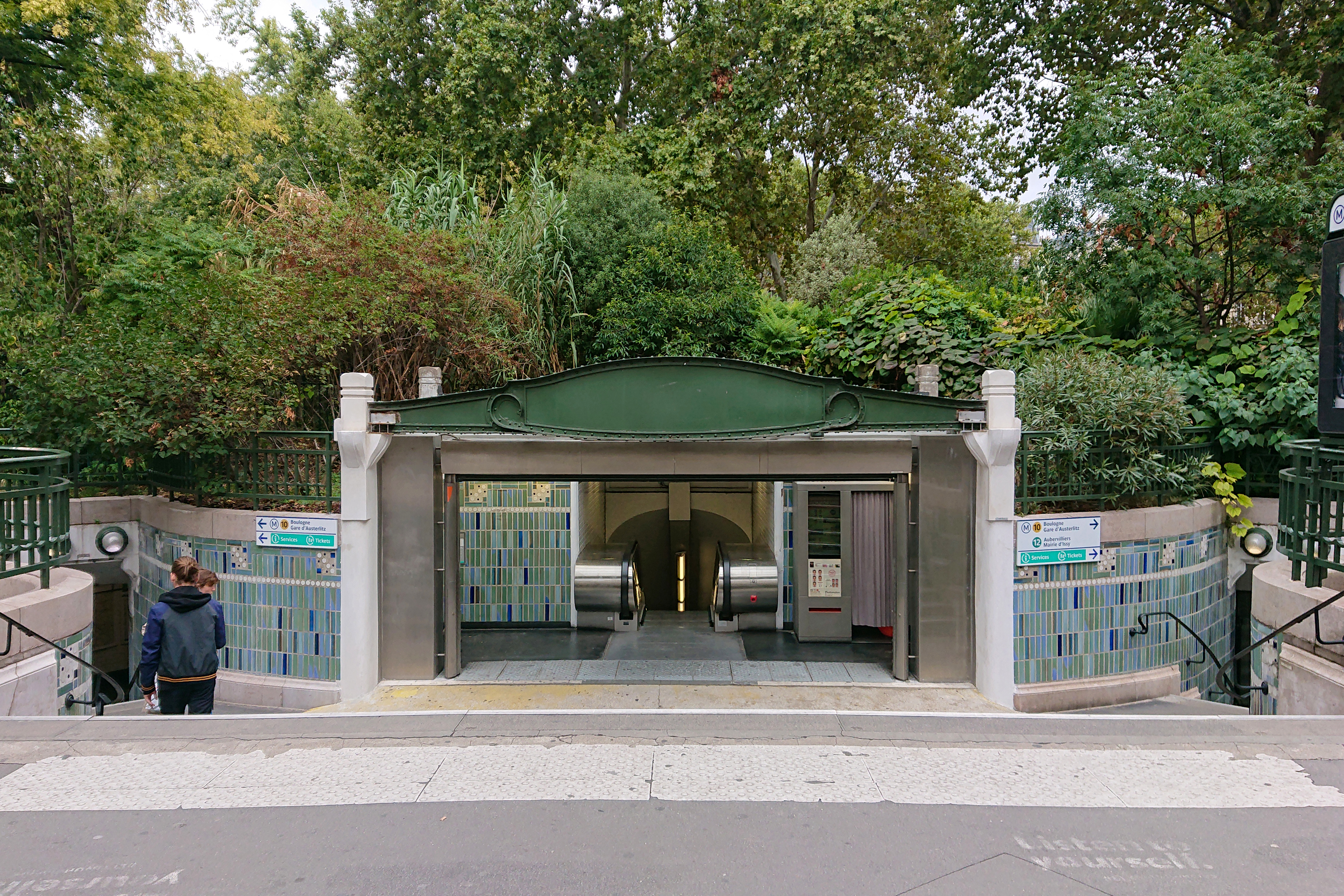
Access 2

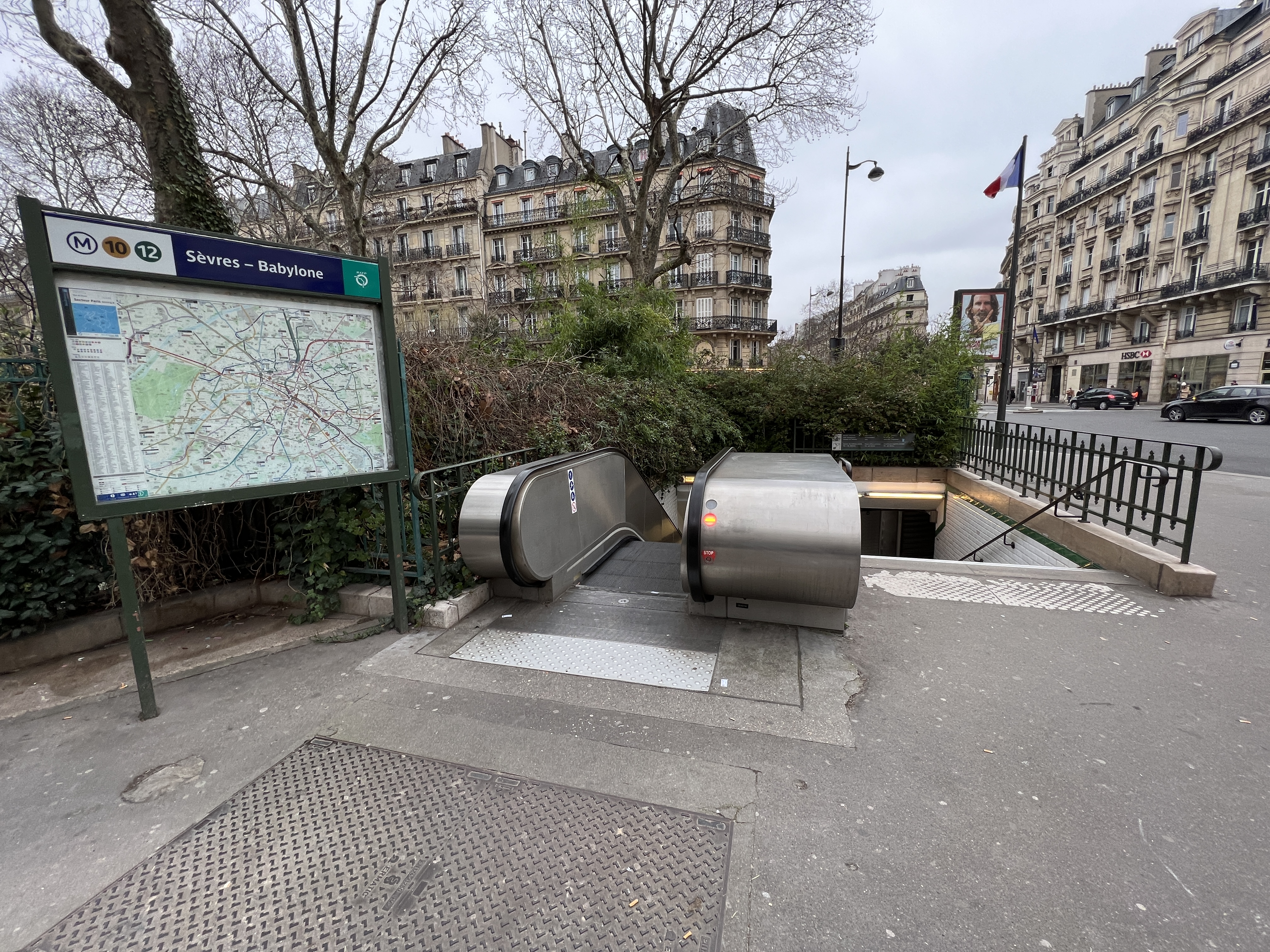
Access 3
