= Croix-Rouge station =

Closed metro station in Paris, France

Coordinates: 48°51′07″N 2°19′46″E

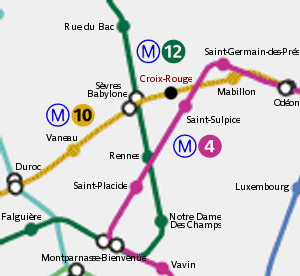
Location map

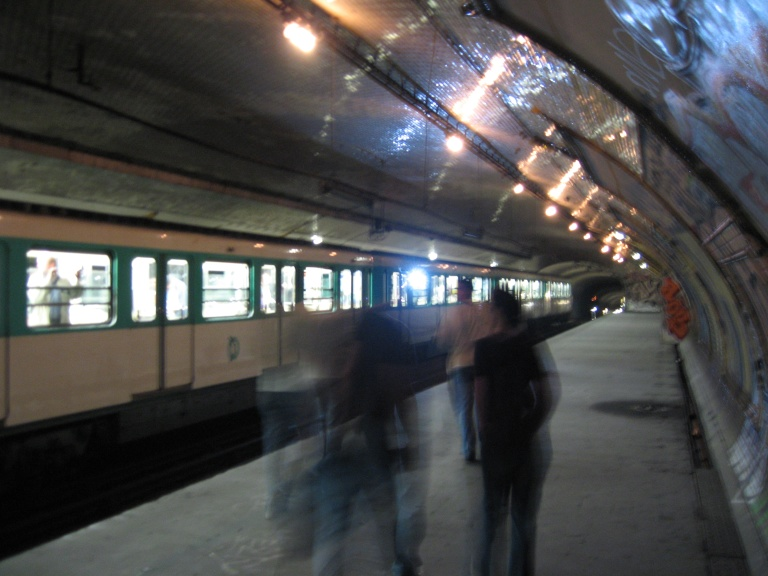
View from the platform

Croix-Rouge station (French pronunciation: [kʁwɑ ʁuʒ]) was the first terminus of Line 10 of the Paris Métro. It opened in 1923, but closed in 1939. The station was situated in the 6th arrondissement of Paris, between Sèvres–Babylone and Mabillon.

== History ==
The name of the station comes from the junction named Croix-Rouge, situated at the north-eastern end of the Rue du Cherche-Midi. The name had previously been in existence for several centuries. It is unrelated to the International Red Cross and Red Crescent Movement (generally referred to in French as the Croix-Rouge), founded in 1863.

The station was closed on 2 September 1939, with France's entry into the Second World War and the mobilisation of staff from the Compagnie du chemin de fer métropolitain de Paris (CMP). It was reopened after the Liberation but then closed again due to its proximity to the station Sèvres–Babylone.

The bus stop at the same location retained the Croix-Rouge name until 31 December 2005, when it was renamed Michel-Debré, after Michel Debré, first Prime Minister under the Fifth Republic and co-author of the Constitution of France. Apart from the street sign Carrefour de la Croix-Rouge at the junction, there is therefore no longer any official trace of the name.
