= Compagnie du chemin de fer métropolitain de Paris =

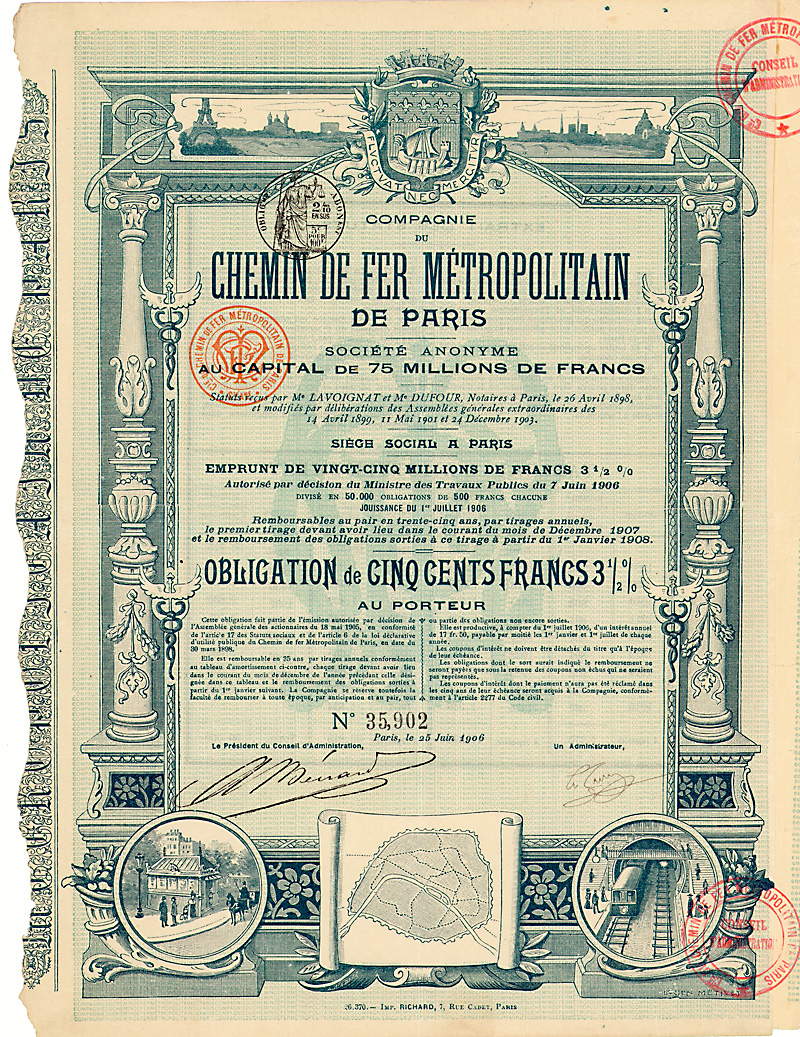
Obligation of the CdF Metropolitain de Paris S.A. from the 25. June 1906

The Compagnie du chemin de fer métropolitain de Paris S.A. (Paris Metropolitan Railway Company Ltd.), or CMP, was a subsidiary of the Empain group that is the forerunner of the RATP, the company managing the Paris Métro.

== Origin ==
So as not to be dependent on the Chemin de fer de l'État (State Railways) for its rail transport, the City of Paris decided in 1883 on the construction of a subway network. There were some tensions between the national government and the city for the control of the operation, but the approach of the World Fair of 1900 speeded the decisions. In 1895, Louis Barthou, minister for public works, accepted that the construction work should be carried out by the city. That included building the tunnels, viaducts and stations and contracting for the operation. In 1897 the city council chose the General Traction Company, owned by the Belgian Baron Édouard Louis Joseph Empain. An act of 30 March 1898 declared a public utility for "the construction of a metropolitan railway by electric traction, intended for the transport of the travelers and their hand luggage". The General Traction Company formed the CMP in April 1898.

== The first lines ==
Construction started under the responsibility of engineer Fulgence Bienvenüe. Line 1 was opened in 1900 after twenty months of work. Another line, Porte Dauphine-Nation (now Line 2), opened in April 1903.

== Mergers ==
In 1929, the company merged with the Company of the North-South underground electric railroad of Paris. In 1938, the CMP took over the Sceaux line, which had until then formed part of the Paris-Orleans railway company. In 1942, the company amalgamated with the Company of public transport of the Paris area which was limited to surface transport. The files of the company were destroyed at the Liberation of Paris. In 1949 the functions of the CMP were taken over by the newly formed RATP.
