= Place Jean-Paul-Sartre-et-Simone-de-Beauvoir =

Square in Paris 6th arrondissement, France

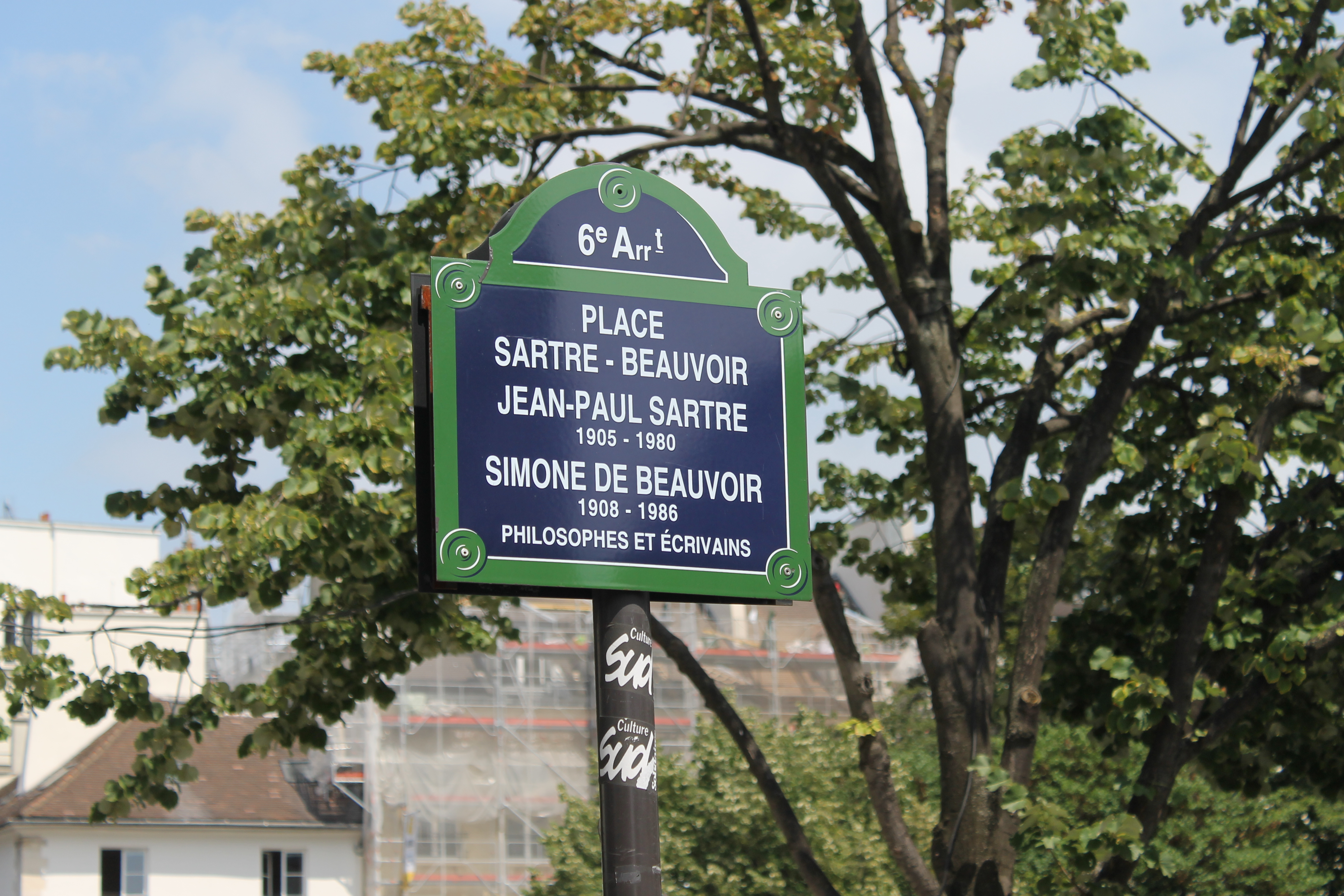

- Location within Paris
- Arrondissement: 6th
- Quarter: Saint-Germain-des-Prés
- Coordinates: 48°51′13″N 2°20′00″E
- From: Boulevard Saint-Germain
- To: Rue Bonaparte

The Place Jean-Paul-Sartre-et-Simone-de-Beauvoir is a square in Saint-Germain-des-Prés in the 6th arrondissement of Paris, France.

== History ==
It was named after Jean-Paul Sartre and Simone de Beauvoir, two French philosophers who were a couple. The pair lived close to the square at 42 rue Bonaparte.

The square was named the Place Jean-Paul-Sartre-et-Simone-de-Beauvoir in April 2000.

This is one of the few squares in Paris to be officially named after a couple, like the Place Louise-Catherine-Breslau-et-Madeleine-Zillhardt and the Allée Claude-Cahun-Marcel-Moore, which is also situated in the 6th.

== Access ==
Saint-Germain-des-Prés (Paris Métro) has access on the street.

== Places of interests ==
- Café de Flore
- Les Deux Magots
- Saint-Germain-des-Prés (abbey)
