= La Hune =

Former bookstore and art gallery in Paris, now a photography-focused gallery

Coordinates: 48°51′16.54″N 2°20′2.37″E

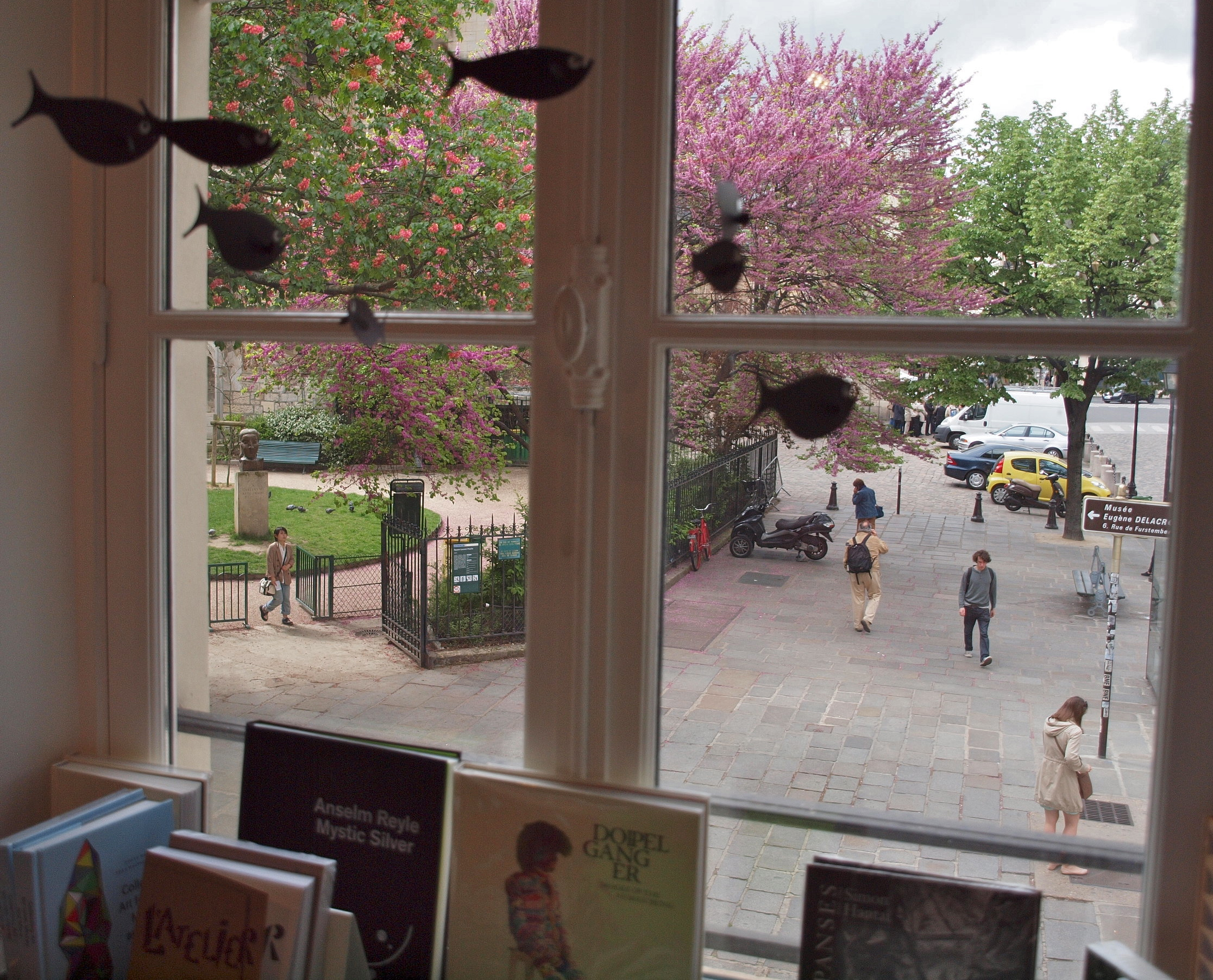
- View from a window of the Rue de l’Abbaye bookstore overlooking Place Saint-Germain-des-Prés (2013)
- Type: Bookstore and art gallery
- Industry: Bookselling, art exhibition, photography
- Founded: June 1, 1944
- Founder: Bernard Gheerbrant, Jacqueline Lemunier, Pierre Roustang
- Fate: Original bookstore closed in 2015; name and concept continued by YellowKorner as a photography gallery
- Headquarters: Paris, France: 12 Rue Monsieur-le-Prince (1944–1949); 170 Boulevard Saint-Germain (1949–1975, bookstore until 2015); 14 Rue de l’Abbaye (1975–1990, gallery); 16–18 Rue de l’Abbaye (2015–present, YellowKorner),
- Key people: Bernard Gheerbrant (founder and director), Jacqueline Gheerbrant (co-founder), Marc Eschenbrenner (gallery director, 1991–2014)
- Owner: Founders (1944–1981); Flammarion (1981–2012, bookstore); Madrigall (2012–2015, bookstore); YellowKorner (2015–present)
- Website: www.la-hune.com

La Hune was a bookstore and art gallery established in 1949 by Bernard Gheerbrant at 170 Boulevard Saint-Germain in Paris, France, within the Saint-Germain-des-Prés quarter of the 6th arrondissement. Today, its legacy continues at a different location as a bookstore-gallery dedicated exclusively to art photography, operated by the French publisher YellowKorner. This modern iteration is situated at 16–18 Rue de l’Abbaye, still within the same historic neighborhood.

== History ==
=== The first La Hune at 12 Rue Monsieur-le-Prince: 1944–1949 ===
In June 1944, three philosophy students from the Sorbonne—Bernard Gheerbrant, Jacqueline Lemunier, and Pierre Roustang—founded the original La Hune bookstore at 12 Rue Monsieur-le-Prince, at the corner of Rue Casimir-Delavigne. The name "La Hune" (French for "the topsail" or "crow's nest") was inspired by its corner location, evoking the prow of a ship, while the internal staircase resembled the mast of a sailing ship, particularly the platform used by sailors for high maneuvers.

Following the Liberation of France, Pierre Roustang left the venture, and Jacqueline Lemunier and Bernard Gheerbrant married. In October 1945, they hired bookseller Jacques Farny to manage daily operations, freeing them to focus on cultural events and gallery development. Alongside building a robust book collection, particularly in art, Gheerbrant envisioned La Hune as a hub for literary events, publishing, and exhibitions. Nine exhibitions took place at this address, beginning with "Aux Indes avec Lanza del Vasto" on December 2, 1944. This month-long display of drawings and watercolors by Lou Albert-Lasard, illustrating Lanza del Vasto’s Pèlerinage aux sources, occupied the first floor and established Gheerbrant's ambition to blend visual arts and literature. A subsequent posthumous exhibition of Louis Marcoussis’s engravings marked an early focus on printmaking.

The space soon proved too small, prompting Gheerbrant to relocate to Saint-Germain-des-Prés in 1949. The original site at 12 Rue Monsieur-le-Prince remained a bookstore, later becoming L’Escalier and, in 1953, acquired by François Maspero. It continues to operate today.

=== La Hune bookstore-gallery at 170 Boulevard Saint-Germain: 1949–1975 ===
On May 12, 1949, La Hune opened its new premises at 170 Boulevard Saint-Germain, at the intersection with Rue Saint-Benoît, opposite the brasserie Lipp and between Les Deux Magots and Café de Flore. The building, previously a late 19th-century Bouillon Duval restaurant, had been abandoned since World War II, briefly serving as a military canteen for the Paris garrison non-commissioned officers.

Gheerbrant enlisted his friend Pierre Faucheux (1924–1999), a celebrated editorial designer, to oversee the architectural renovation. Faucheux, who had assisted with the original location, designed La Hune’s iconic logotype—a stylized anchor—and its exterior showcases. The bookstore hosted numerous book signings and receptions for French and American authors, and from 1957, it convened the Prix de Mai jury for its first five editions. Renowned for its displays of literary and artistic works, often paired with graphic art exhibitions or documentary showcases, La Hune became a cultural landmark.

While engraving dominated its exhibition roster, the gallery embraced diverse themes, including historical displays like Aragon's "La Peinture au défi" (1954), featuring collages by Pablo Picasso, Joan Miró, Man Ray, and Max Ernst; literary tributes such as "Hommage à James Joyce" (1949) and "Saint-John Perse et la mer" (1962); primitive art ("Dogons, art du Soudan" in 1955); and photography ("Édouard Boubat, Brassaï, Robert Doisneau, Izis, and Paul Facchetti" in 1951).

From 1958, La Hune began publishing prints, spotlighting emerging artists like Johnny Friedlaender, Zao Wou-Ki, and Virgil Nevjestic, alongside established figures such as sculptor Henri-Georges Adam and painter Hans Hartung. The venue closed for renovations in July 1969, overseen by the Parisian studio Gérard Ifert – Rudolf Meyer, reopening on October 16 with expanded bookshelves encroaching on gallery space.

=== La Hune gallery at 14 Rue de l’Abbaye: 1975–1990 ===
In 1975, La Hune split into two entities. The bookstore remained at Boulevard Saint-Germain, while the gallery relocated to 14 Rue de l’Abbaye, facing Place Saint-Germain-des-Prés and its church. Gheerbrant managed the bookstore until 1981, when it was acquired by Flammarion. He continued directing the gallery, promoting artists like Fred Deux, Cécile Reims, and Bertrand Dorny, and publishing bibliophile books, engravings, and lithographs. Notable exhibitions included Axel Cassel's painted sculptures (1984), Alekos Fassianos (1985), and Philippe Favier (1988).

In 1991, Marc Eschenbrenner, a former collaborator, assumed leadership, renaming it Galerie La Hune-Brenner. It moved to 3 Rue Ravignan in the 18th arrondissement in late 2007, before closing permanently in 2014.

=== Departure from Boulevard Saint-Germain ===
In 2012, following Flammarion's acquisition by the Madrigall publishing group, the Boulevard Saint-Germain bookstore came under Madrigall's control. The premises were sold to luxury brand Louis Vuitton, which transformed it into its flagship store in Saint-Germain-des-Prés. The bookstore relocated to the former gallery site at Rue de l’Abbaye, replacing a Dior boutique. However, in 2015, Madrigall sold the space and the La Hune name to YellowKorner, which established a gallery focused on mainstream art photography.

Filmmaker Denis Gheerbrant, son of the founder, decried this as an "usurpation" in a Le Monde op-ed, arguing the name should have retired with the original bookstore. The historic bookstore closed on June 14, 2015, reopening in November as Librairie-galerie La Hune under YellowKorner. The ground floor now houses a YellowKorner gallery and TeNeues bookstore, with monographic photo exhibitions and original prints upstairs. Once a generalist bookstore, it now specializes solely in art photography.

A symbol of Saint-Germain-des-Prés—nicknamed The Magic Triangle by Gheerbrant for its proximity to Les Deux Magots, Le Flore, and Lipp—La Hune faded nearly 70 years after its founding, succumbing to the area's gentrification and the rise of luxury boutiques.

=== Fire and reconstruction ===
On November 16, 2017, during an exhibition of Matthieu Ricard’s Un demi-siècle dans l’Himalaya, a severe fire ravaged La Hune’s ground floor and upper levels, injuring seven, including a firefighter. Rebuilt under Bâtiments de France supervision, it reopened in November 2018 with an exhibition by Ellen von Unwerth.

== Exhibitions since YellowKorner's acquisition ==
The following exhibitions have been held:

- October 2015 – February 2016: Elliott Erwitt
- February – April 2016: Oliviero Toscani (Mini Toscanis)
- April – June 2016: Marc Lagrange (Hommage)
- June – September 2016: Jimmy Nelson (Before They Pass Away) September 2016: IDEAT (20/20)
- October 2016: Jean-Charles de Castelbajac
- October – November 2016: Araki (Diary – Sentimental Journey)
- December 2016 – February 2017: Steve Hiett (Cool Pola)
- February 2017: Elliott Erwitt (Paris – New York)
- May 2017: Vincent Peters (Personal)
- September – November 2017: Matthieu Ricard (Un demi-siècle dans l’Himalaya)
- November 2018: Ellen von Unwerth (Guilty Pleasure)
- February 2019: Matthieu Ricard (Un demi-siècle dans l’Himalaya)
- September 2019: Arno Elias (I'm Not a Trophy)
- February 2020: Bruno Mouron and Pascal Rostain (Autopsie)
- November 2021: Laurent Baheux

== Legacy ==
The archives of La Hune are preserved at the Kandinsky Library of the Musée national d'Art moderne – Centre Georges Pompidou. The museum honored the bookstore with an exhibition from June 30 to October 10, 1988, as part of the "Les années 50" retrospective," and featured it in the temporary "Passeurs" exhibit from January 14 to August 31, 2016.

== See also ==
- Saint-Germain-des-Prés
- French literature
- Les Deux Magots
- Café de Flore

== Bibliography ==
- Adler, Laure (1998). Marguerite Duras (in French). Paris: Gallimard. ISBN 9782070414727.
- Chevallier, Camille (2015). "La librairie-galerie La Hune. De la place d'un lieu d'édition et de monstration dans l'histoire des expositions" [La Hune bookshop-gallery. The place of a publishing and exhibition space in the history of exhibitions]. Revue exPosition (Research dissertation under Cécilia Hurley-Griener) (in French) (4). Paris: Ecole du Louvre: 150.
- Gheerbrant, Bernard (1988). À la Hune, histoire d'une librairie-galerie à Saint-Germain-des-Prés [At La Hune, History of a Bookstore-Gallery in Saint-Germain-des-Prés] (Digital reissue) (in French). Paris: Adam Biro, Centre Georges-Pompidou. p. 200. ISBN 2-85850-450-4.
