= Café de Flore =

One of the oldest coffeehouses in Paris

Coordinates: 48°51′15″N 2°19′57.5″E

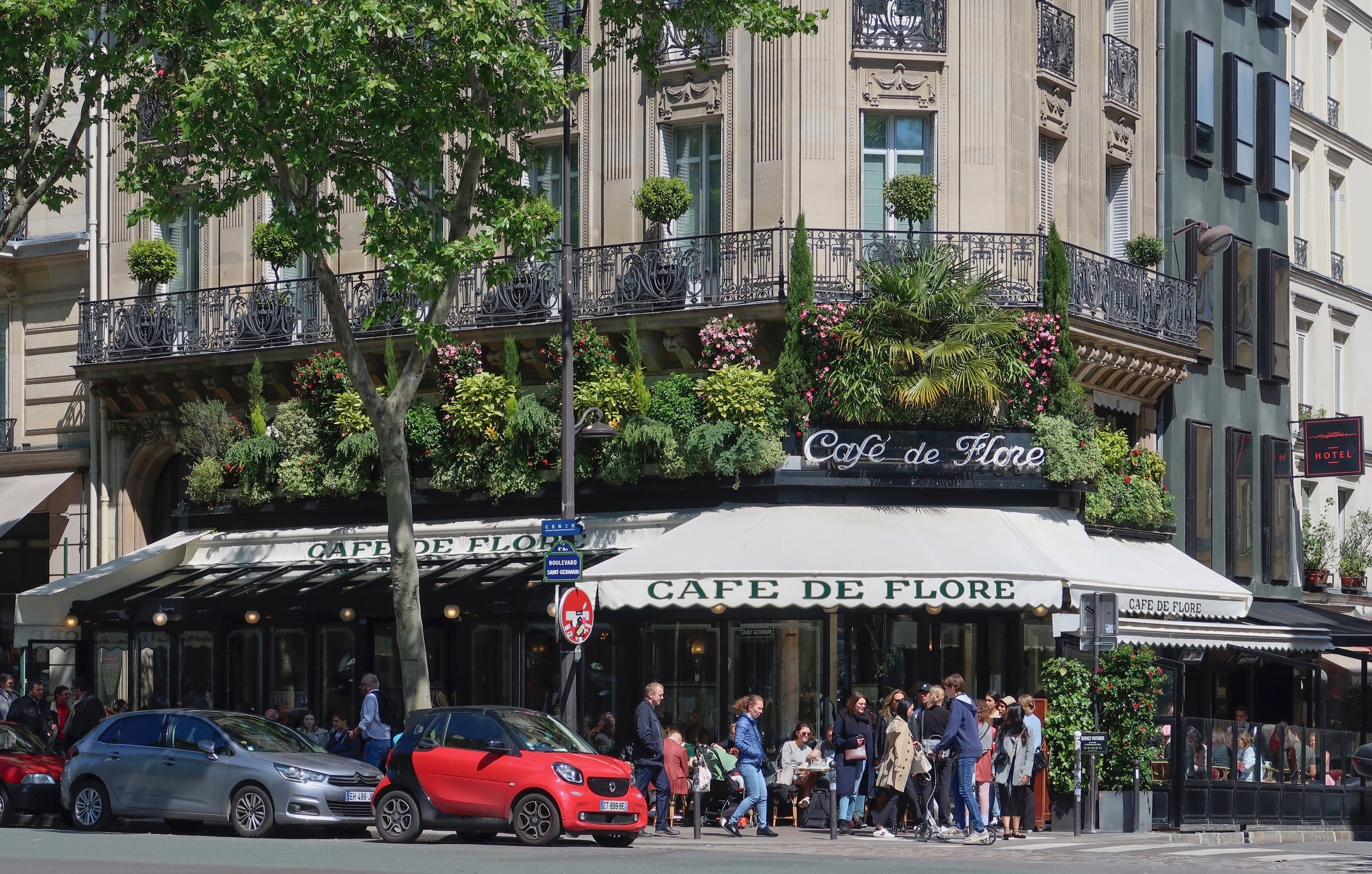
A view of the Café de Flore in Saint-Germain-des-Prés

Thé Café de Flore (French pronunciation: [kafe d(ə) flɔʁ]) is one of the oldest coffeehouses in Paris, known for its emblematic shopfront and celebrated for its famous clientele, which in the past included influential writers, philosophers, and members of Parisian high society (tout-Paris). The café is located in Saint-Germain-des-Prés, a historic quarter on the left bank of the Seine. It sits the corner of Boulevard Saint-Germain and Rue Saint-Benoît, in the 6th arrondissement.

The nearest underground station is Saint-Germain-des-Prés, served by line 4 of Paris Métro. While attracting numerous tourists due to its historic cachet, the coffeehouse remains a popular hang-out spot for Parisians and celebrities alike.

== History ==
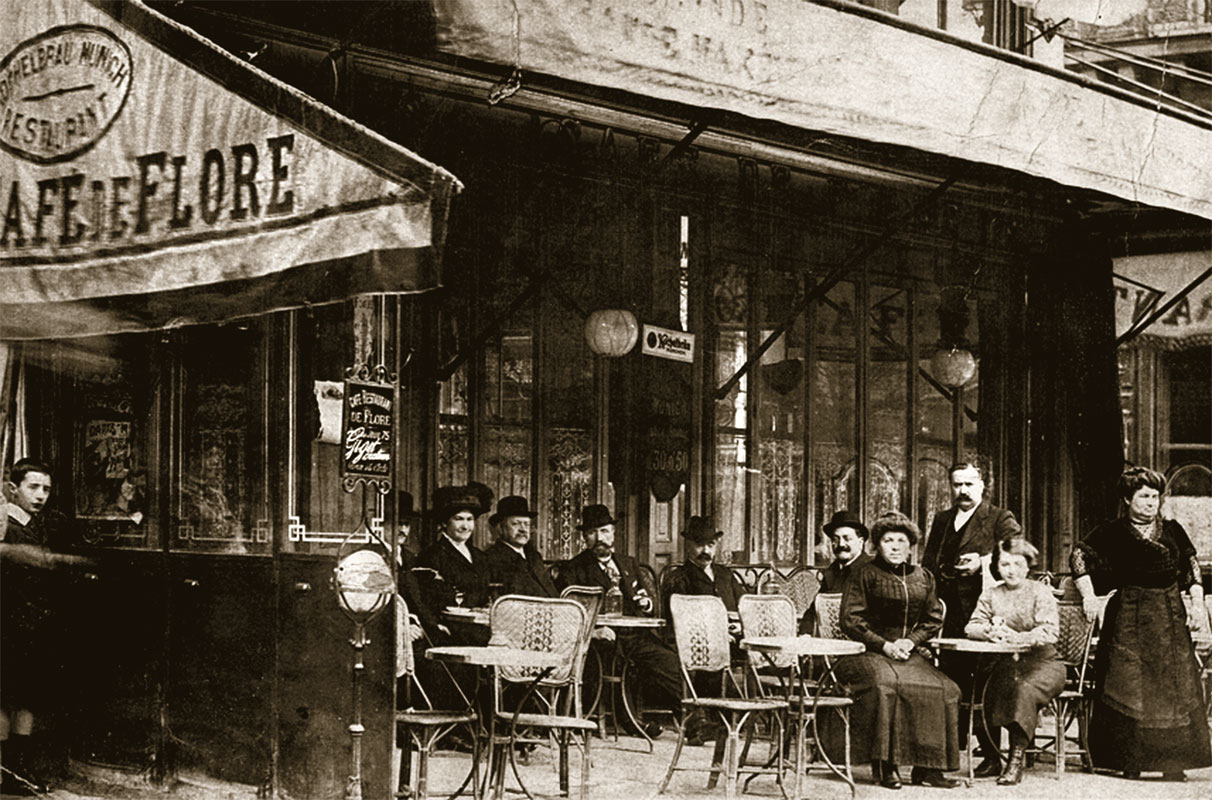
The Café de Flore, c. 1900

Philippe Derome, Le Flore, oil on canvas, 1974

The café appeared in the 1880s, during the Third Republic; however, the exact opening date remains unknown. The name is taken from a sculpture of Flora, the goddess of flowers and the season of spring in Roman mythology, located on the opposite side of the boulevard. Authors Joris-Karl Huysmans and Remy de Gourmont were two of the first well-known regulars. In the late 19th century, Charles Maurras wrote his book Au signe de Flore on the café's first floor, where in 1899 the Revue d'Action Française was also founded.

The Café de Flore became a popular hub of famous writers and philosophers. Georges Bataille, Robert Desnos, Léon-Paul Fargue, Raymond Queneau were all regulars, as was Pablo Picasso. Chinese Premier Zhou Enlai was known to be a frequent patron of Café de Flore during his years in France in the 1920s. The classic Art Deco interior of all red seating, mahogany and mirrors has changed little since World War II.

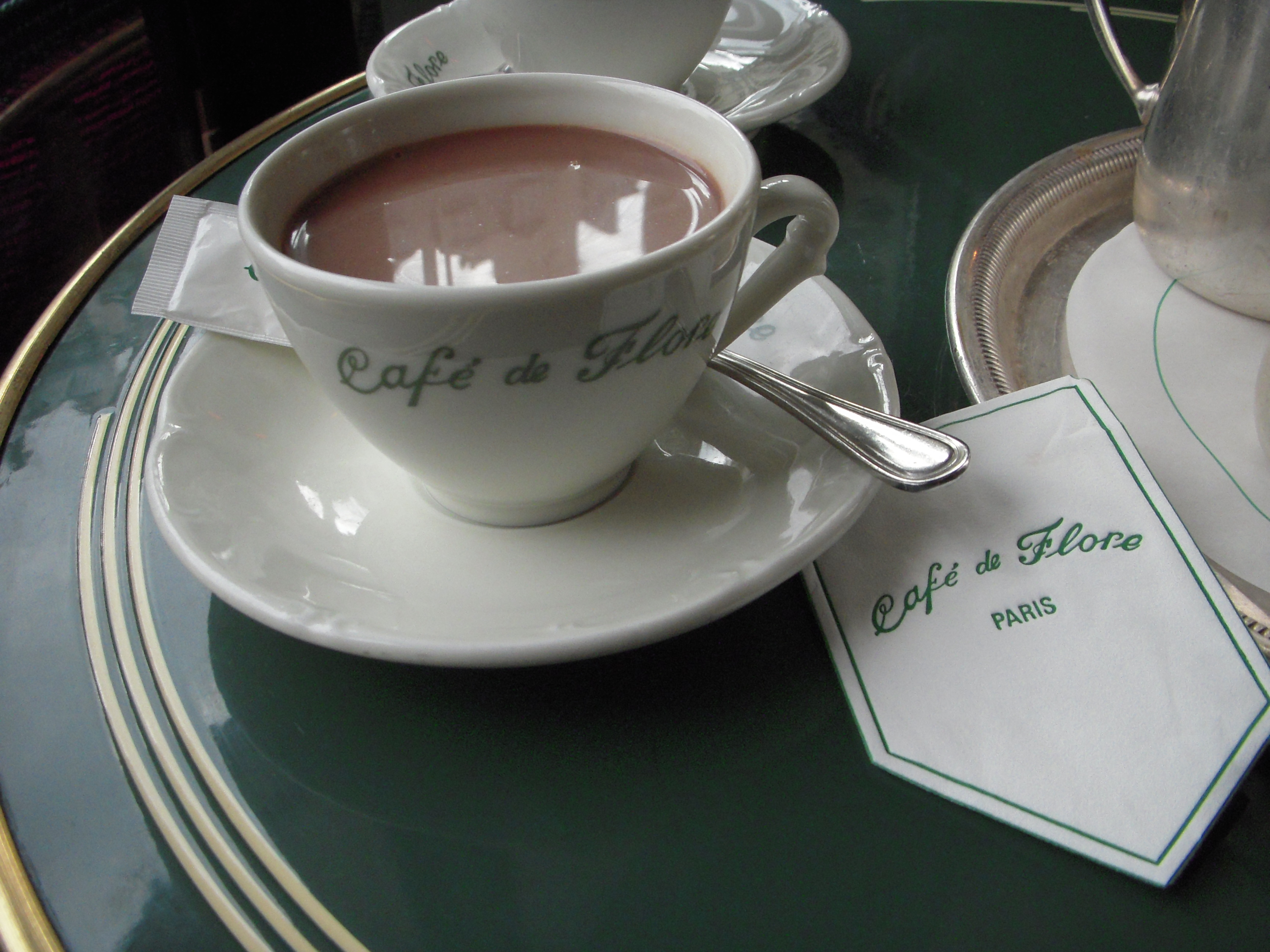
Hot chocolate at the Café de Flore

Like its nearby rival, Les Deux Magots, Café de Flore was frequented by numerous French intellectuals during the post-war years. In his essay "A Tale of Two Cafes" and his book Paris to the Moon, American writer Adam Gopnik mused over the possible explanations of why the Flore had become, by the late 1990s, much more fashionable and popular than Les Deux Magots, despite the fact that the latter café was associated with Jean-Paul Sartre, Simone de Beauvoir, Albert Camus, and other famous thinkers of the 1940s and 1950s.

A Romanian thinkers league also frequented the place, notably Emil Cioran, Eugene Ionesco and essayist Benjamin Fondane.

The Prix de Flore, a literary prize inaugurated by Frédéric Beigbeder in 1994, is awarded annually at the Café de Flore.

== In popular culture ==
- James Baldwin wrote much of his 1953 classic "Go Tell It On The Mountain" while drinking cognac and coffee on the cafe's second floor.
- Designer Yves Saint Laurent named an ensemble in his bohemian-influenced Autumn 1960 Dior collection "Café de Flore".
- Café de Flore appeared in the 1963 film The Fire Within.
- The café is mentioned in the 1975 song "Et mon père" by Nicolas Peyrac.
- Amanda Lear filmed her music video "Égal" in Café de Flore in 1981.
- The café was a setting and featured in the dust jacket of Ravelstein, written by Saul Bellow.
- The café was featured in the 3rd episode ("Paris") of series 4 of Absolutely Fabulous in 2001.
- The coffeehouse appeared in the lyrics of the 2002 song "L'Entarté" by Renaud.
- It is the subject of Les Amants du Flore (2006), a film about Jean-Paul Sartre and Simone de Beauvoir.
- Parts of the 2011 film Love Lasts Three Years were filmed in Café de Flore.
- Season 1, episode 6 of Emily in Paris contains a scene filmed in Café de Flore.
- "Cafe de Flore", 2022 song by the Moldovan singer The Motans which appears on the album "Great Expectations"

== See also ==
- Café Procope
- La Hune
- Les Deux Magots
- Place Jean-Paul-Sartre-et-Simone-de-Beauvoir
