= Magot (figurine) =

European term for a type of East Asian figurine

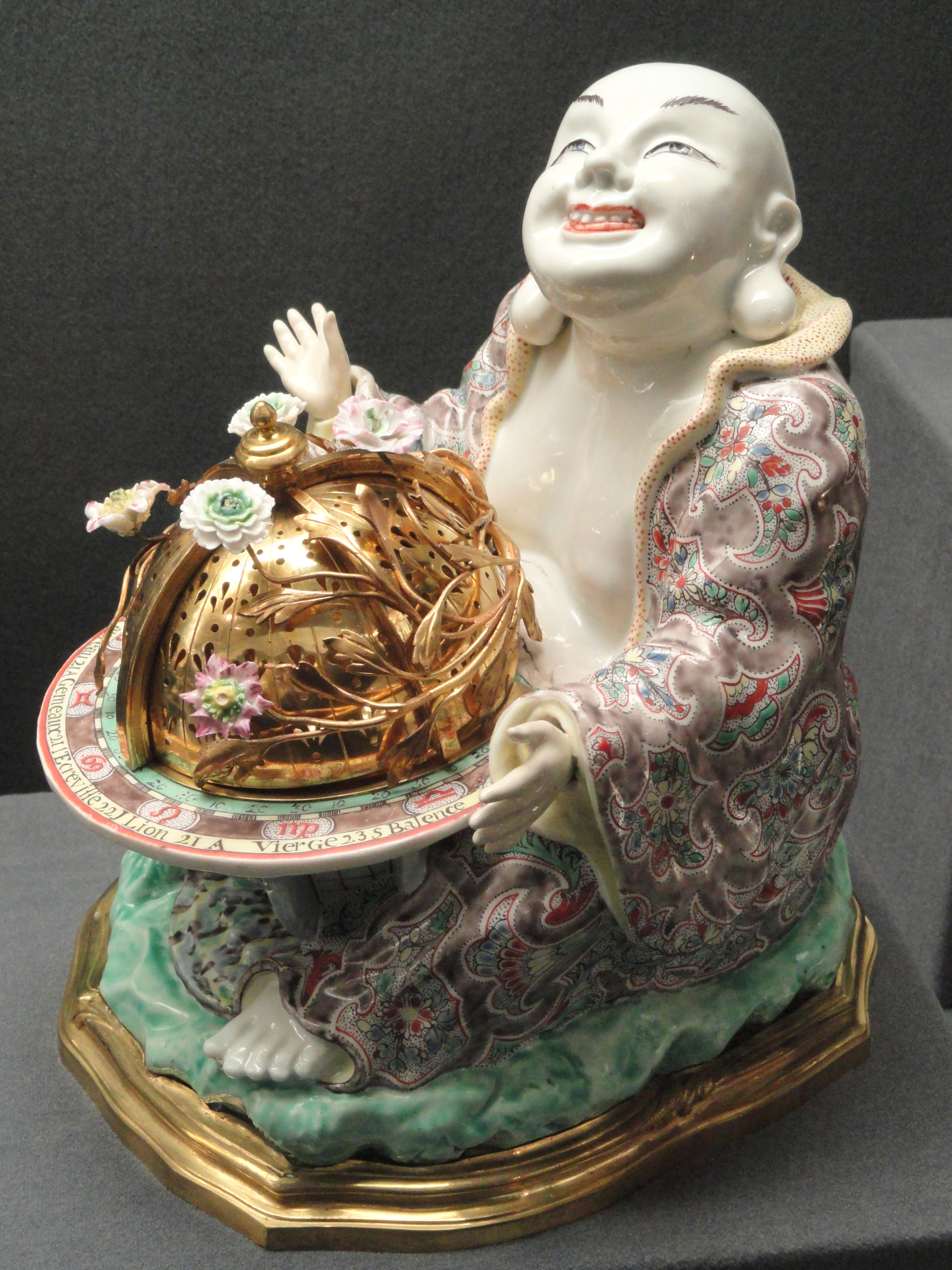
18th-century perfume-burner in the form of a magot

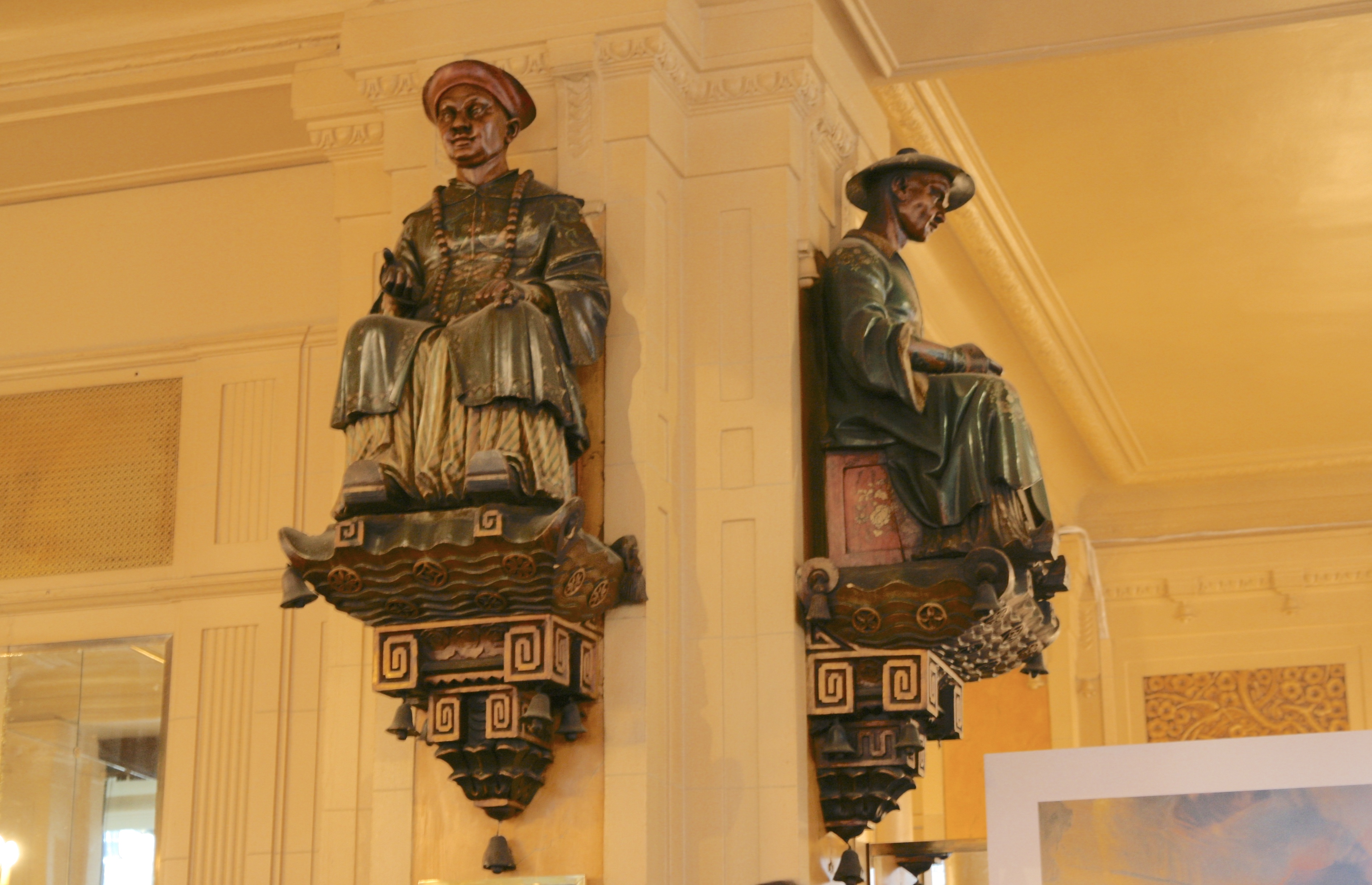
Two Chinese figurines called magots, inside the café Les Deux Magots in Paris

A magot is a seated oriental figurine, usually of porcelain or ivory. Some have a grotesque form; the name derives from the Barbary ape, also known as "magot".

== History ==
Magots (also referred to as "pagods" or "pagodes") became popular in Europe from the second half of the 17^{th} century onwards, when such figures were first imported from the Far East, primarily China.

These initial statuettes were made of clay, plaster, copper, or porcelain, as well as wood, silk, or paper.

Due to their popularity, magots were produced during the 18^{th} century in Europe at places like the Chantilly Porcelain Factory; also factories in Mennecy, Saint-Cloud, and elsewhere.

== Use ==
Apart from decoration, magots would serve practical purposes, such as holding potpourri or covering incense burners.
