= Rue Bonaparte =

Street in Paris, France

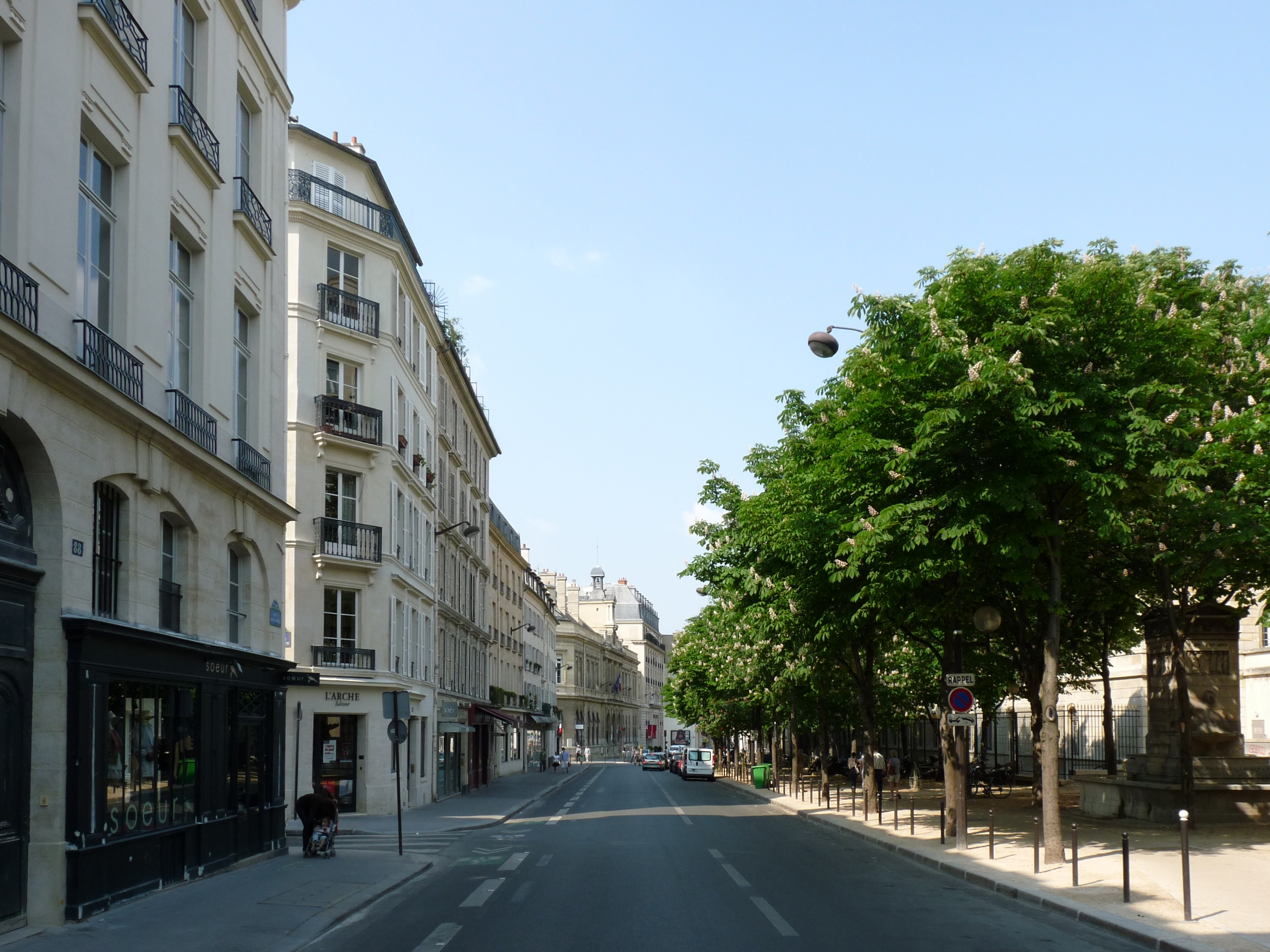
- View starting at no. 88 Rue Bonaparte from the Rue de Vaugirard

- Location within Paris
- Length: 1,010 m (3,310 ft)
- Width: 11 m (36 ft)
- Arrondissement: 6th
- Quarter: Saint-Germain-des-Prés, Odéon
- Coordinates: 48°51′11″N 2°19′59″E
- From: 7 Quai Malaquais
- To: 58 rue de Vaugirard

Construction
- Completion: Ord. du 7 septembre 1845
- Denomination: 12 August 1852

The Rue Bonaparte (French pronunciation: [ʁy bɔnapaʁt]) is a street in the 6th arrondissement of Paris. It spans the Quai Voltaire/Quai Malaquais to the Jardin du Luxembourg, crossing the Place Saint-Germain-des-Prés and the Place Saint-Sulpice and has housed many of France's most famous names and institutions as well as other well-known figures from abroad.

The street runs through the heart of the fashionable Left Bank and is characterised by a number of 'hôtels particuliers' (grand townhouses) and elegant apartment buildings as well as being bounded by the river at one end and the park at the other. With fifteen buildings or monuments classified as Monument historique, it has more such listed sites than any other street in the 6th arrondissement.

The Rue Bonaparte also has many literary associations and contains a number of bookshops, antiquarian booksellers, publishers and art galleries. Its architecture and location have made it one of Paris' most historic and sought-after residential addresses.

Located near the Metro stations: Saint-Sulpice, Mabillon and Saint-Germain-des-Prés.

== History ==
The length of the street was formerly the site of a river called La Noue, which at the time formed the eastern boundary of the Pré-aux-Clercs (an area of land belonging to the Abbey of Saint-Germain-des-Prés). Later, the river was enlarged into a 27-m wide canal and named Petite Seine ('Little Seine'), which in turn supplied water to the moat of the Abbey of Saint-Germain-des-Prés when its fortifications were built during the 14th century. In the 17th century, those fortifications were demolished along with the moat and the canal.

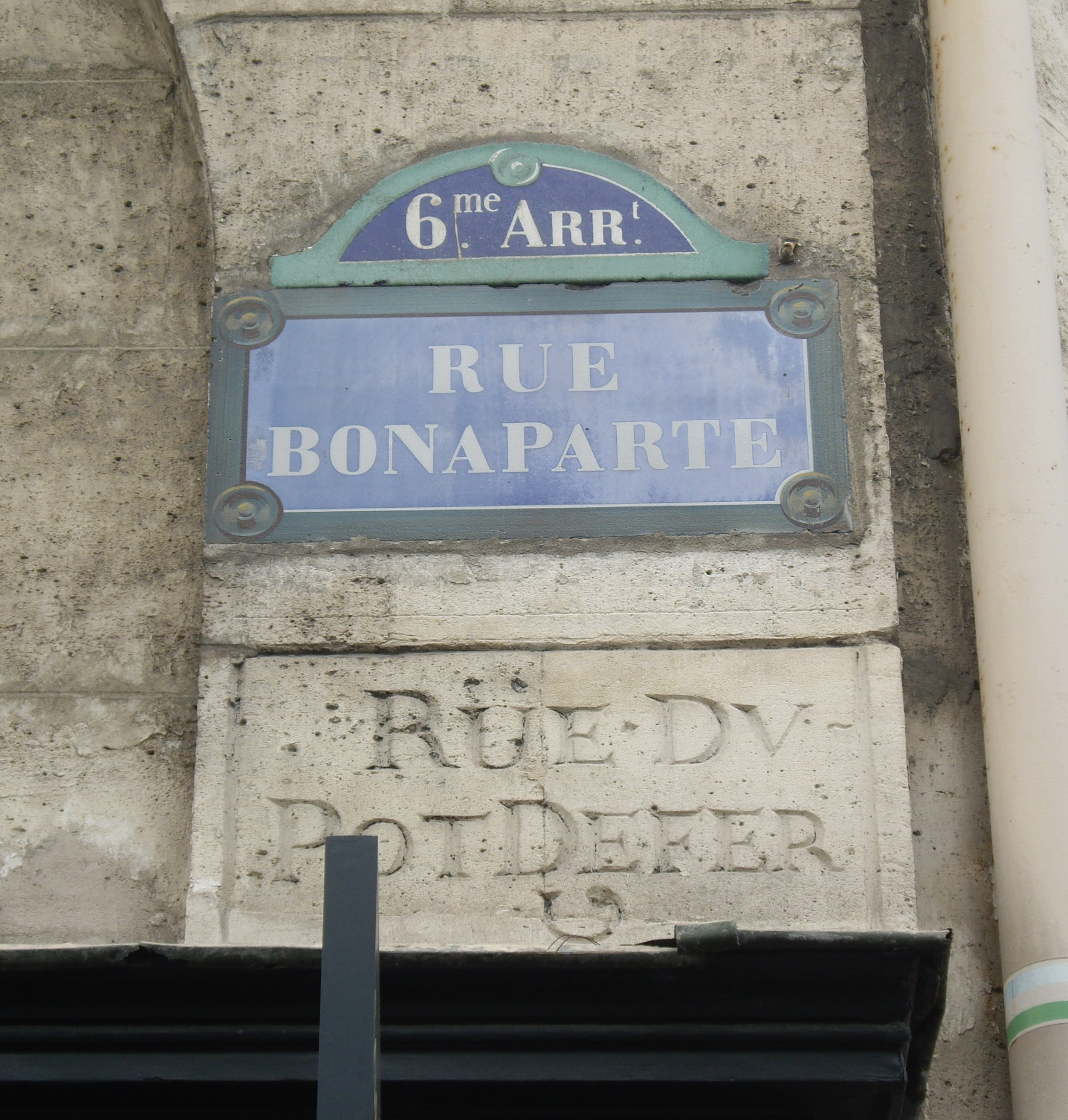
Street plaque also showing former name

At one time, it was divided into two streets – the Rue du Pot de Fer dite du Verger and the Rue des Petits Augustins (also known variously in the late 16th century as the Rue Bouyn, Petite rue de Seine, Rue de la Petite Seine and the Chemin de la Noue). Its present form was established by government decree on 7 September 1845, which resulted in the opening of the part of the street between the Boulevard Saint-Germain and the Rue du Vieux-Colombier. Its name was subsequently changed on 12 August 1852 to commemorate the Emperor Napoleon I.

The name Rue Bonaparte was first proposed during the period of the Consulate; it was formally renamed Saint-Germain-des-Prés under the Bourbon Restoration, and then officially regained the name of Bonaparte a few months after the coup of Louis Napoleon Bonaparte, in August 1852.

=== Composition ===
In its present form it has subsumed the following historic streets:

- Rue des Petits-Augustins, between the Quai Malaquais and the Rue Jacob

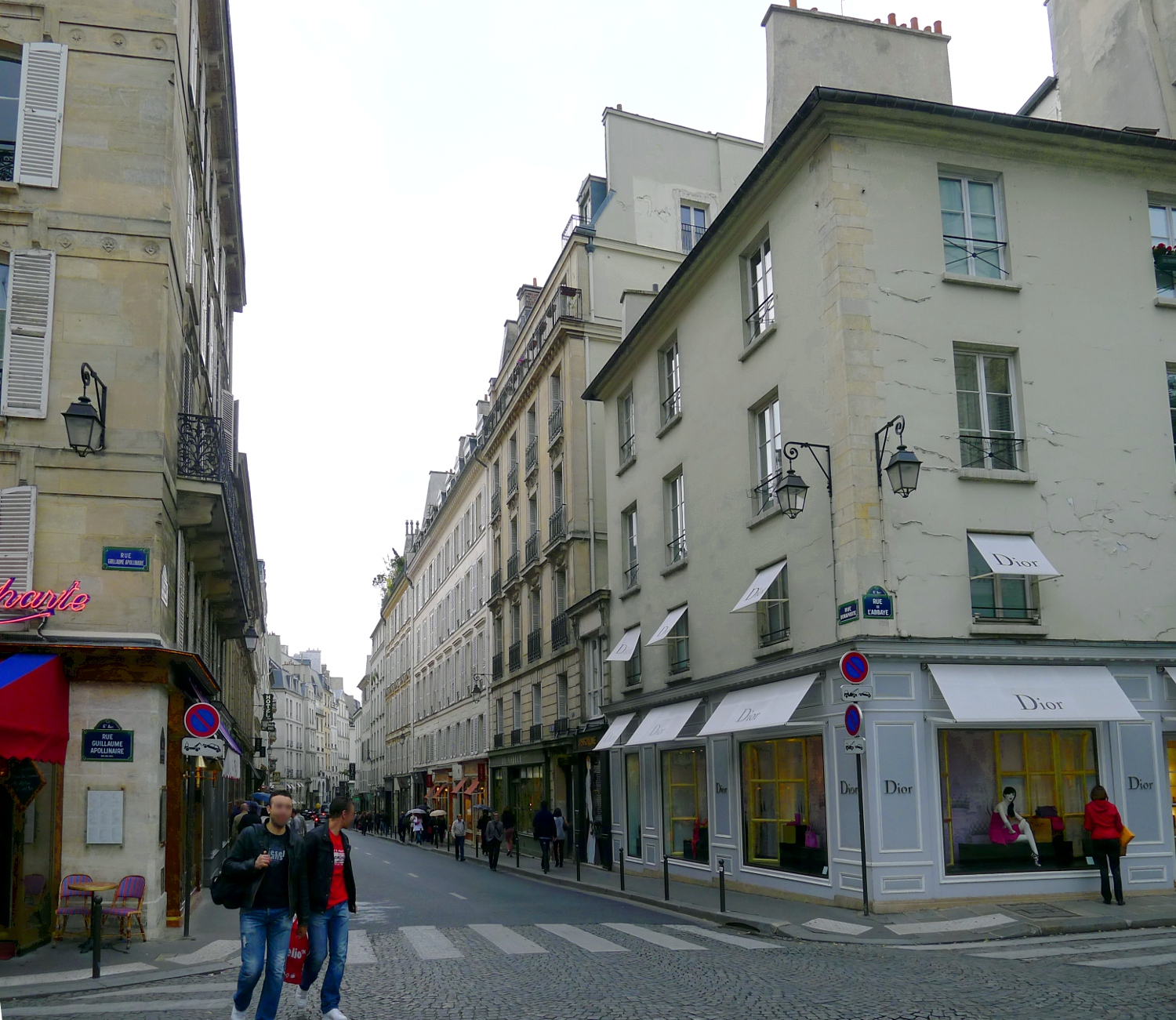
Rue Bonaparte, view of the Place Saint-Germain-des-Prés looking towards the Rue Jacob

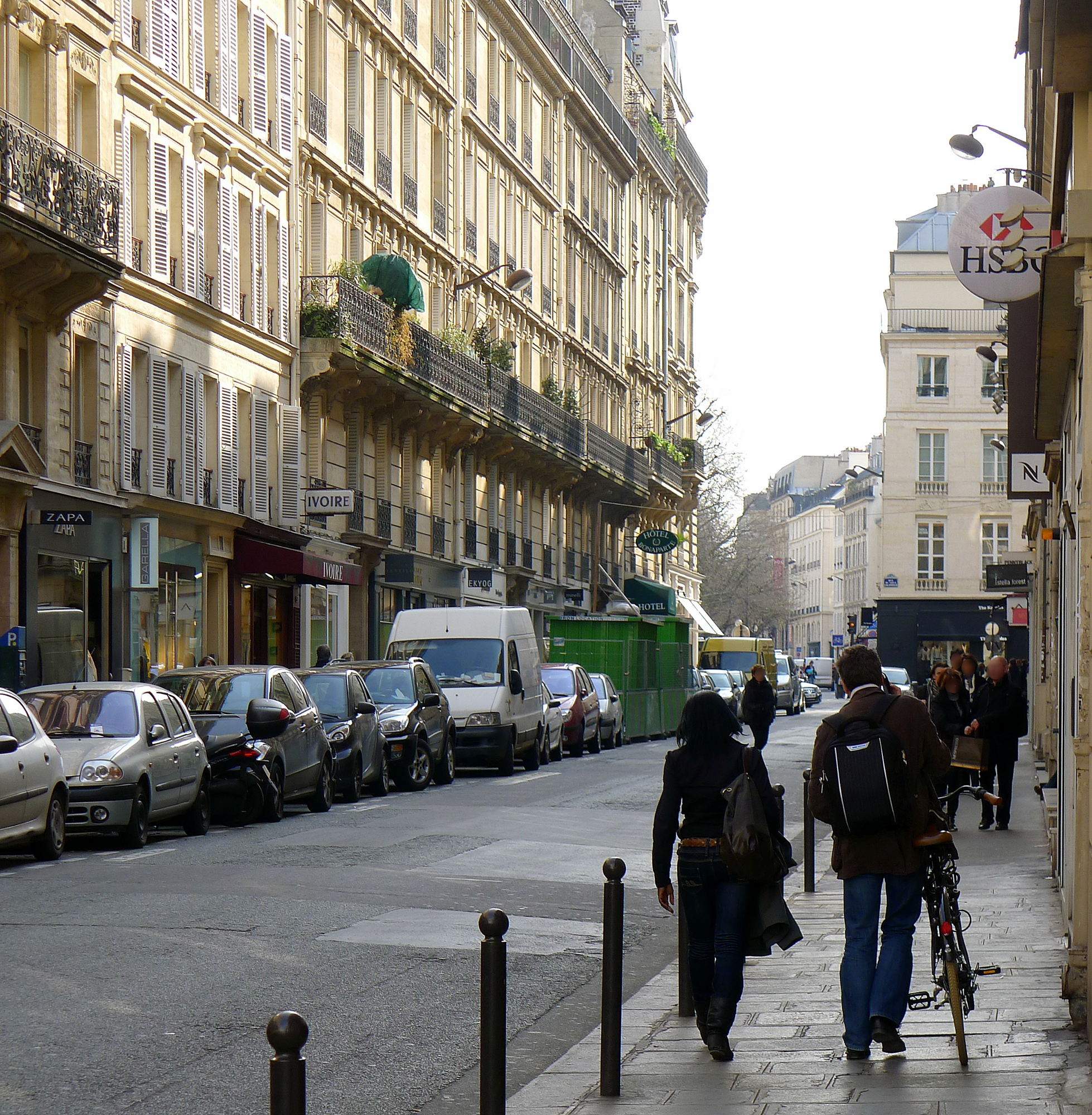
Rue Bonaparte, looking towards the Place Saint-Sulpice

- Rue Saint-Germain-des-Prés, opened in 1804, between the Rue Jacob and St-Germain-des-Prés, it was named variously the Cour des Religieux, Rue Bonaparte, Rue de la Poste aux Chevaux and in 1816 Rue Saint Germain des Prés, before finally reassuming its current name.
- Rue Saint-Germain, between the Place Saint-Germain-des-Prés and the Place Saint-Sulpice was named in 1847. In 1804, this part of the street, which at times was known as the old Rue Saint-Germain-des-Prés, ran between the Rue Jacob and the Rue du Vieux Colombier.
- Rue du Pot de Fer Saint-Sulpice, between the Rue du Vieux-Colombier and the Rue de Vaugirard, was named in the 15th century the Ruelle Saint-Sulpice, then Ruelle Henri du Vergier, then Rue du Verger. At the beginning of the 17th century, it was renamed the Rue du Pot de Fer dite du Verger. Some historians suggest that it was also known as the Rue des Jardins Saint-Sulpice and Rue des Jésuites.
- Rue du Luxembourg in 1879, was the name given to the part comprising the Rue de Vaugirard and the Rue d'Assas, then in 1918, the name Rue Guynemer.

== Landmarks ==
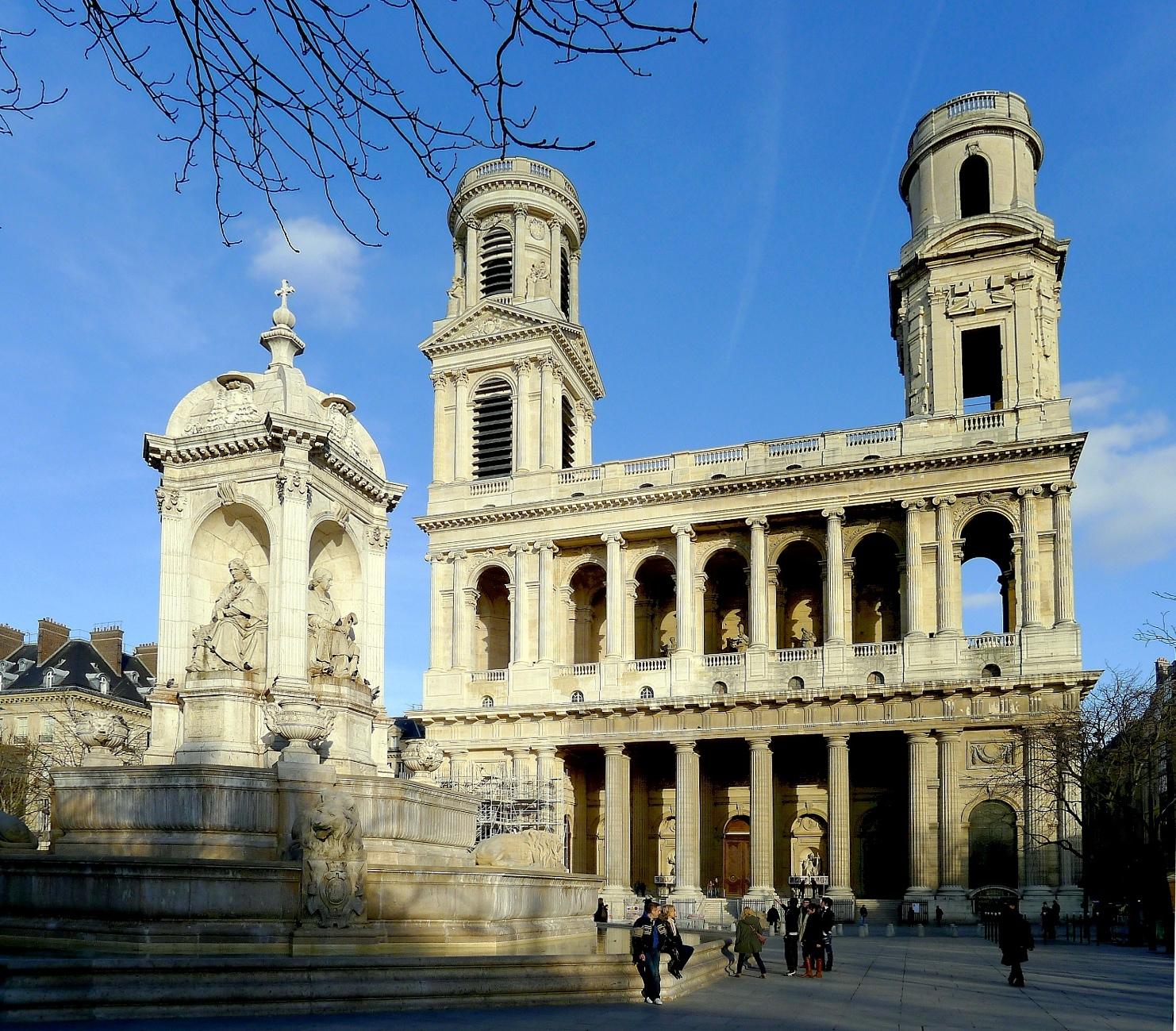
The church and fountain of Saint-Sulpice

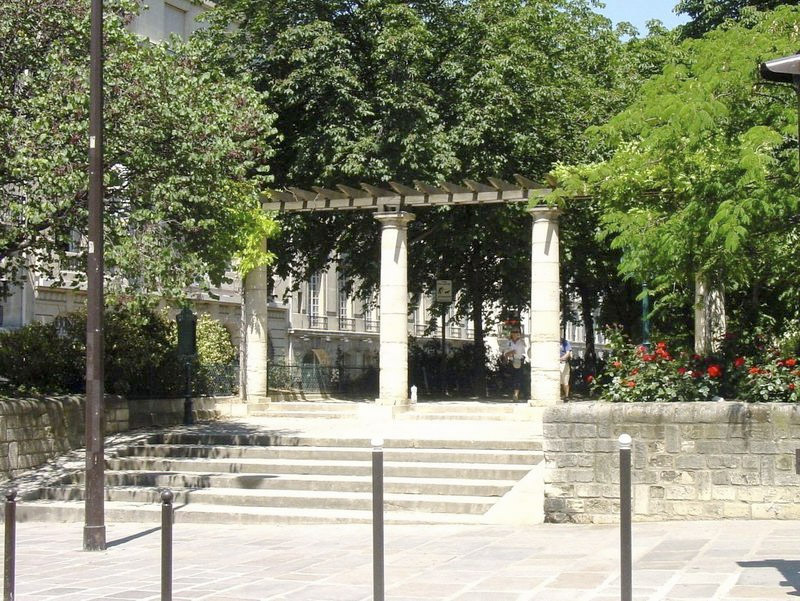
The Allée du Seminaire opposite nos. 88-92 rue Bonaparte

The Rue Bonaparte itself contains some of Paris' notable landmarks, including:

- The Ecole de Beaux Arts
- The Académie nationale de médecine
- The Place Saint Germain-des-Prés
- The Abbey of Saint-Germain-des-Prés
- The Fontaine de la Paix
- The Church of Saint-Sulpice
- The Saint-Sulpice Fountain
- The Promenade de l'allée du Séminaire
- The Jardin du Luxembourg is at its southern tip

== Notable addresses ==
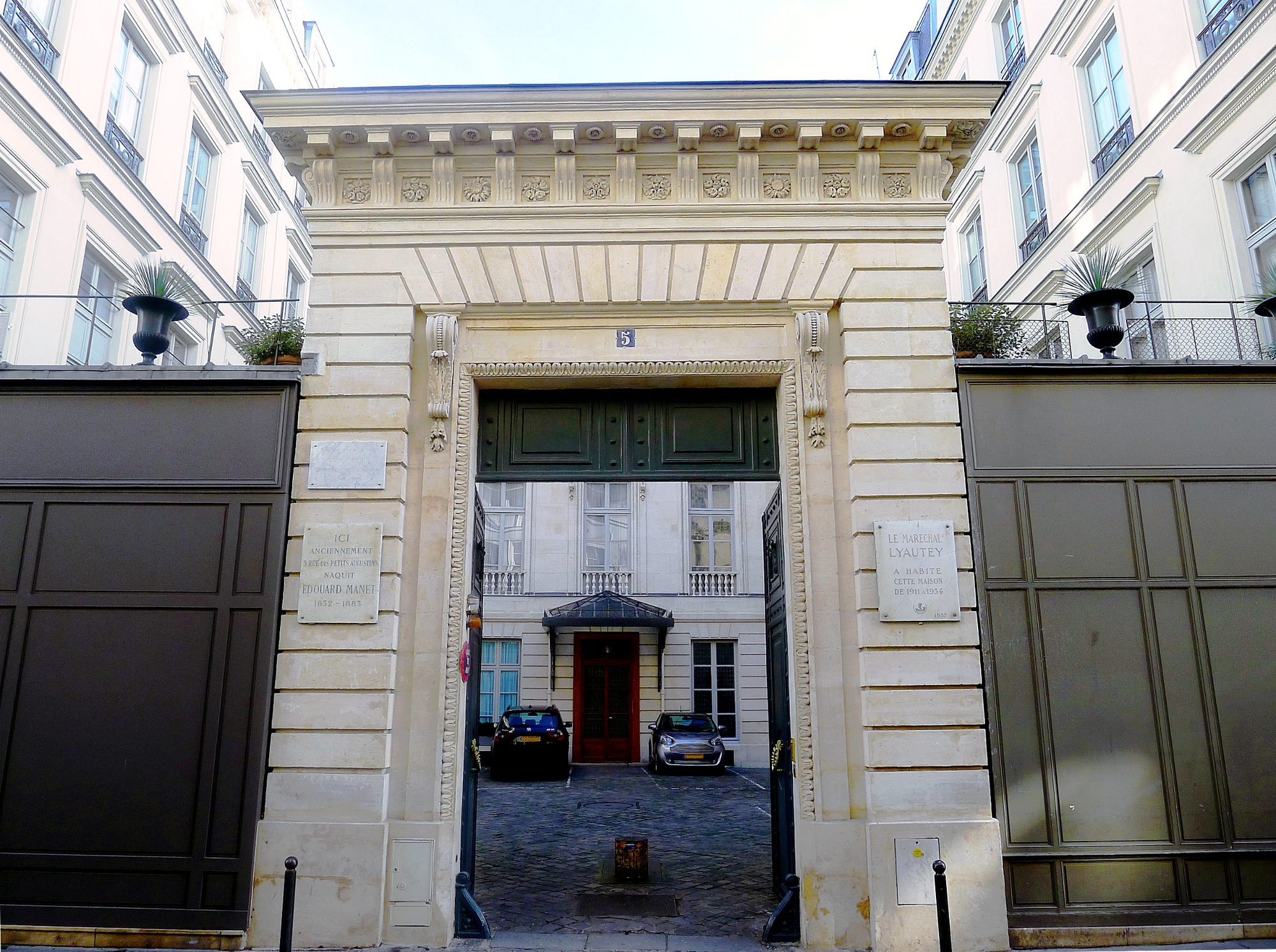
No. 5 rue Bonaparte

- No. 5: Birthplace of the French painter Édouard Manet (the street was then called the Rue des Petits Augustins) on 23 January 1832. Home of French field marshal and colonial administrator le Maréchal Hubert Lyautey from 1911 to 1934. French National Heritage site (Monument historique).
- No. 13: Art studios of Modernist French painters André Derain and André Dunoyer de Segonzac, as well as Anglo-French painter Paul Maze.
- No. 14: The École nationale supérieure des Beaux-Arts. French National Heritage site (Monument historique).
- No. 16: Académie nationale de médecine (National Academy of Medicine). French National Heritage site (Monument historique).
- No. 18: Site of the first provisional government of Czechoslovakia in 1916. It is marked by a plaque which reads "Ici en 1916 le gouvernement provisoire tchecoslovaque établit son siège sous la présidence de T. G. Masaryk".
- No. 19: Home of the French painter Amédée Jullien from 1861 to 1875. French National Heritage site (Monument historique).
- No. 24: The American novelist Henry Miller stayed at no. 24 between 1928 and 1930 during which time he began his relationship with the American writer Anaïs Nin.
- No. 30: The restaurant at no. 30, the Café Pré aux Clercs, was Ernest Hemingway's favourite haunt in Paris.
- No. 31: The Salon des Cent was established there in 1894.
- No. 34: Workshop of the famous painter François Gerard. Home of Romy Schneider in the 1970s and of Georges Wolinski from 1974 to 2008.
- No. 36: Home of French philosopher and sociologist Auguste Comte, between 1817 and 1822, during which time he published his first essays.
- No. 42: Home of French philosopher Jean-Paul Sartre and Simone de Beauvoir, from 1945 to 1962. During this period, Sartre was involved in establishing the quarterly literary and political review, Les Temps Modernes (Modern Times) as well as publishing some of his best-known works including: Les Mains Sales (Dirty Hands), Les Chemins de la Liberté (The Roads to Freedom), the Critique de la raison dialectique (Critique of Dialectical Reason), and Les Mots (The Words), La Mort dans l'Âme (Troubled Sleep – also known as: Iron in the soul), Le diable et le bon dieu (The Devil and the Good Lord), Kean, and Les séquestrés d'Altona (The Condemned of Altona).
- No. 88: Dating from 1680, this 'hôtel particulier' was the home of French Cardinal, diplomat and man of letters, Melchior de Polignac, from 1732 until his death in 1742. From 1794 until 1815, it was the residence of French Catholic priest, abolitionist and revolutionary, Abbé Gregoire. French National Heritage site (Monument historique).
- No. 92: The Hungarian Cultural Institute
- Other notable current and former residents are Voltaire, Nancy Cunard, and Catherine Deneuve.
