= Saint-Germain-des-Prés station =

Metro station in Paris, France

Saint-Germain-des-Prés
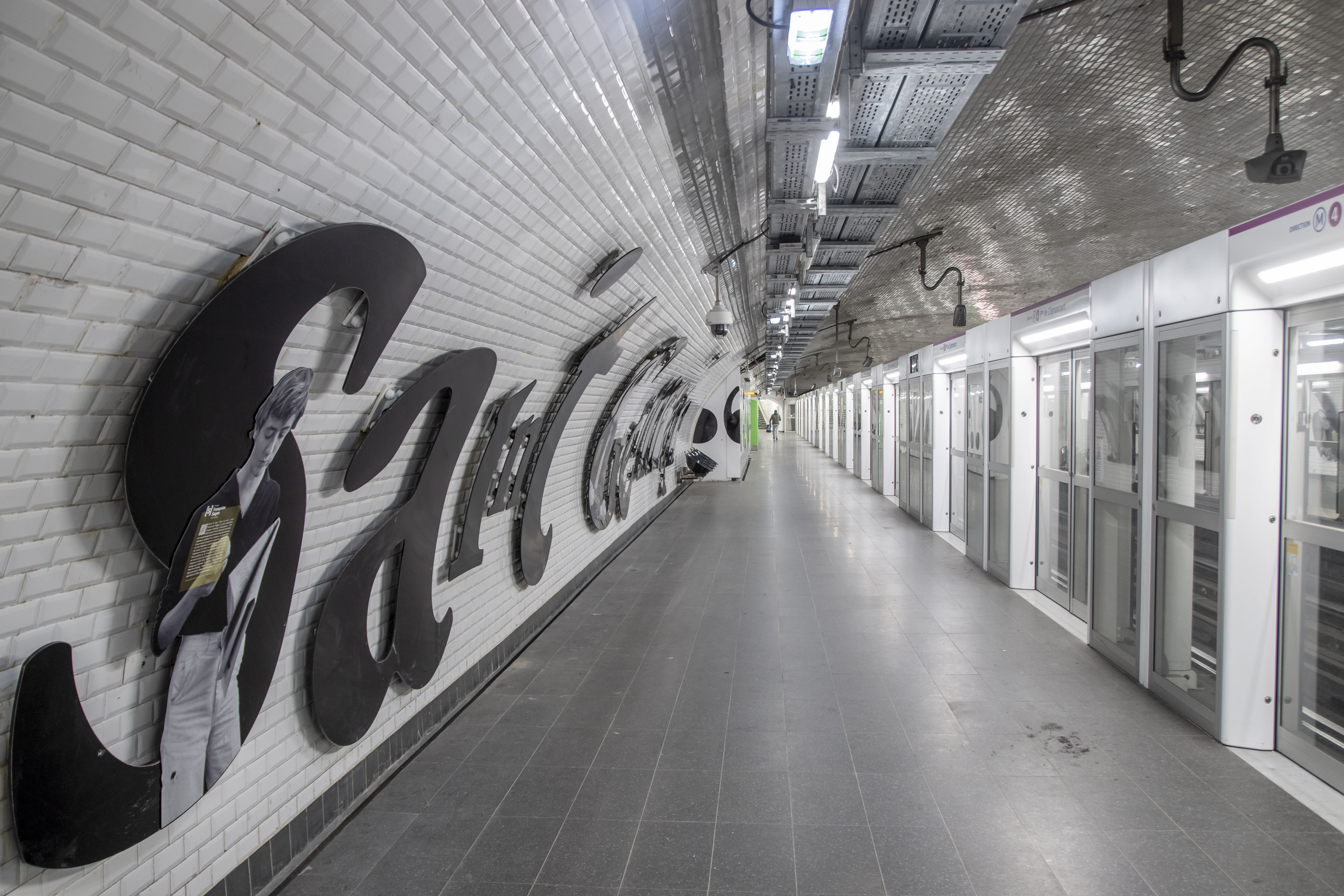
- Platforms

General information
- Location: 147, Boul. Saint-Germain; 168 bis, Boul. Saint-Germain; 6th arrondissement of Paris; Île-de-France; France
- Coordinates: 48°51′14″N 2°20′00″E
- Owner: RATP
- Operator: RATP
- Platforms: 2 (2 side platforms)
- Tracks: 2

Construction
- Accessible: no

Other information
- Station code: 02-15
- Fare zone: 1

History
- Opened: 9 January 1910

Passengers
- 2,378,860 (2021)

Services
Preceding station	Paris Metro	Following station
Saint-Sulpice towards Bagneux–Lucie Aubrac	Line 4	Odéon towards Porte de Clignancourt
Location
- Location within Paris

Saint-Germain-des-Prés (French pronunciation: [sɛ̃ ʒɛʁmɛ̃ de pʁe]) is a station on line 4 of the Paris Métro. It serves the Saint-Germain-des-Prés neighbourhood on the Rive Gauche in the 6th arrondissement.

It is named after Place Saint-Germain and the Church of Saint-Germain-des-Prés, dedicated on 23 December 558 by the son of Clovis, Childebert I (ruled 511–558), at the request of St. Germain, Bishop of Paris. Childebert died the same day and was buried in it. More than a thousand years later the remains of the philosopher René Descartes were also buried in it. The expression "des-Prés" refers to the Prés aux Clercs ("fields of the scholars") used for the erection of buildings to house the University of Paris.

Although the station is near to Mabillon on line 10 (less than 100 metres away), there is no free transfer between the two stations.

== History ==
The station was opened on 9 January 1910 as part of the connecting section of the line under the Seine between Châtelet and Raspail.

Since the métro's centenary in 2000 and until 2016, the station's platforms have had numerous temporary exhibitions on the history literature in the neighbourhood. The platforms also had displays that presented the stories of young literary talents.

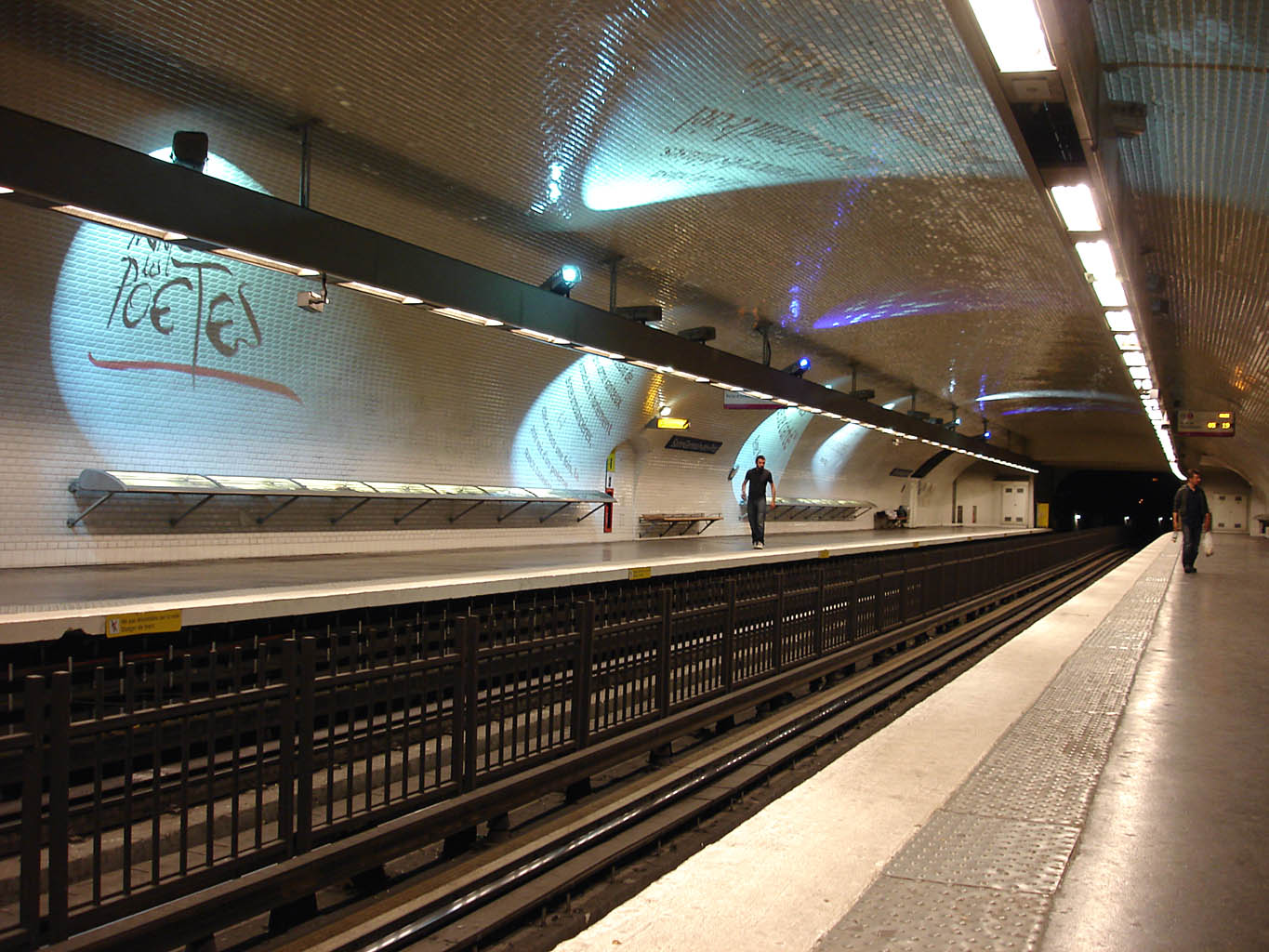
The station before the installation of platform screen doors, with the exhibitions on the platforms.

As part of the automation of line 4, the platforms of line 4 were partially renovated and modernised. Its platform levels were raised to accommodate the installation of platform screen doors which took place from February to May 2019. This was in addition to new lighting being installed, tiling the floor, and the installation of new seats.

In the spring of 2021, a cultural fresco, Le Mythe Saint-Germain: un lexique amoureux (The legend of Saint-Germain: an A to Z of love), was installed on the walls of the platforms. It features several portraits and anecdotes of renowned people who had lived in the vicinity in the past: Boris Vian, Jacques Prévert, Marguerite Duras, Amélie Nothomb, Roland Topor, Juliette Gréco, and Sonia Delaunay. It illustrates a unique neighbourhood that is literary, stylish, creative, and full of culture. It is planned to update the gallery over the years, each time adding an additional 10 new portraits. Several other works of art are also installed in the station: Les Messagers, a bronze sculpture by Gualtiero Busato and a mosaic by André Ropion paying homage to Johannes Gutenberg.

In 2019, the station was used by 3,866,889 passengers, making it the 126th busiest of the Métro network out of 302 stations.

In 2020, the station was used by 1,712,923 passengers amidst the COVID-19 pandemic, making it the 144th busiest of the Métro network out of 304 stations.

In 2021, the station was used by 2,378,860 passengers, making it the 142nd busiest of the Métro network out of 304 stations.

== Passenger services ==
=== Access ===
The station has two accesses (both adorned with a Val d'Osne candelabra):

- Access 1: Église Saint-Germain-des-Prés École des Beaux Arts
- Access 2: rue de Rennes

=== Station layout ===
Street Level
B1	Mezzanine
Platform level	Side platform, doors will open on the right
Platform level	Northbound	← toward Porte de Clignancourt (Odéon)
Platform level	Southbound	toward Bagneux–Lucie Aubrac (Saint-Sulpice) →
Platform level	Side platform, doors will open on the right

=== Platforms ===
The station has a standard configuration with 2 tracks surrounded by 2 side platforms, with platform screen doors installed since May 2019.

=== Bus connections ===
The station is also served by lines 39, 63, 70, 86, 87, 95, 96 of the RATP Bus Network, and at night, by lines N01, N02, N12, and N13 of the Noctilien bus network.

== Nearby ==
- Beaux-Arts de Paris
- Café de Flore
- Church of Saint-Germain-des-Prés
- Les Deux Magots

== Gallery ==
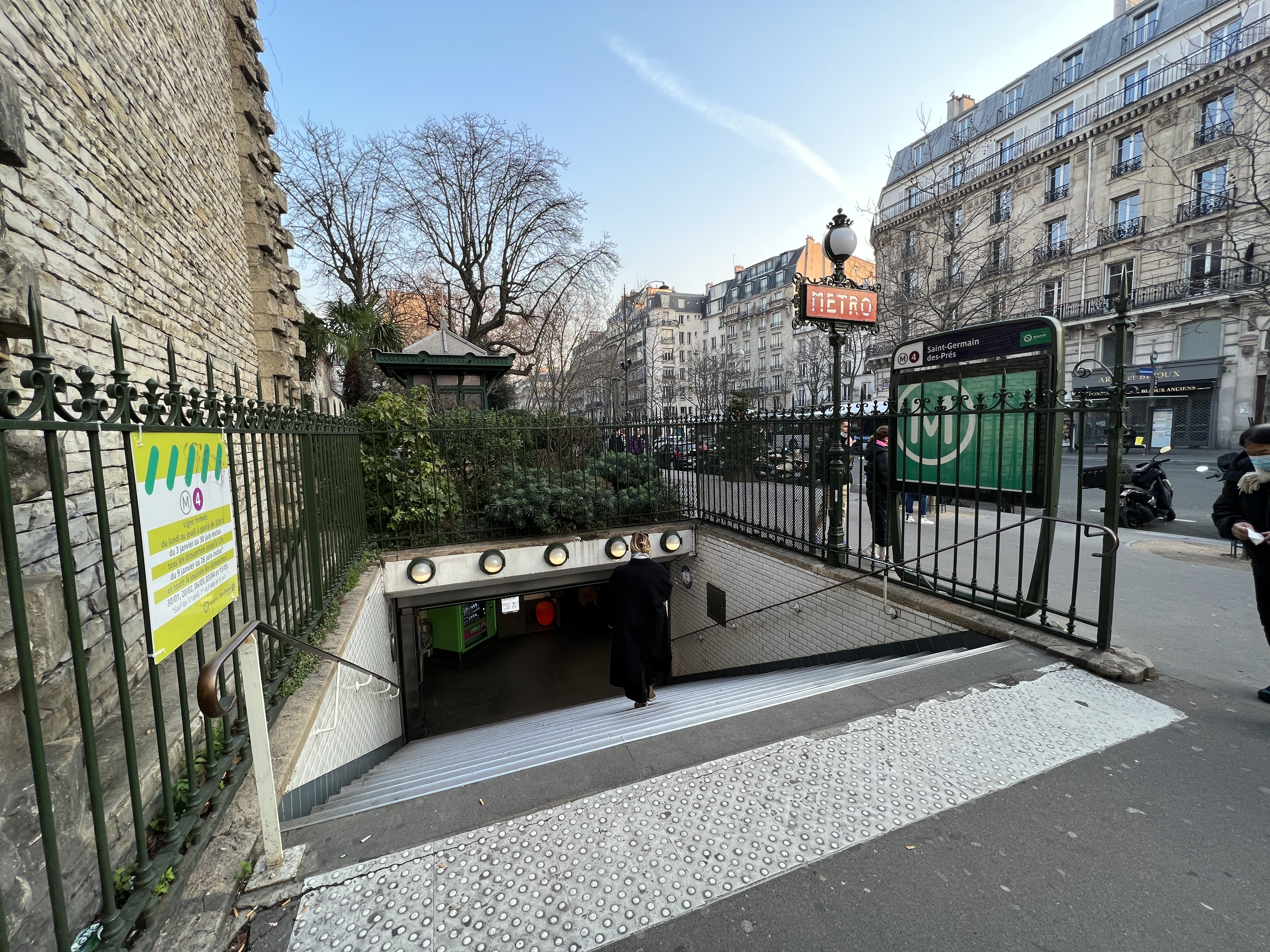
Access 1

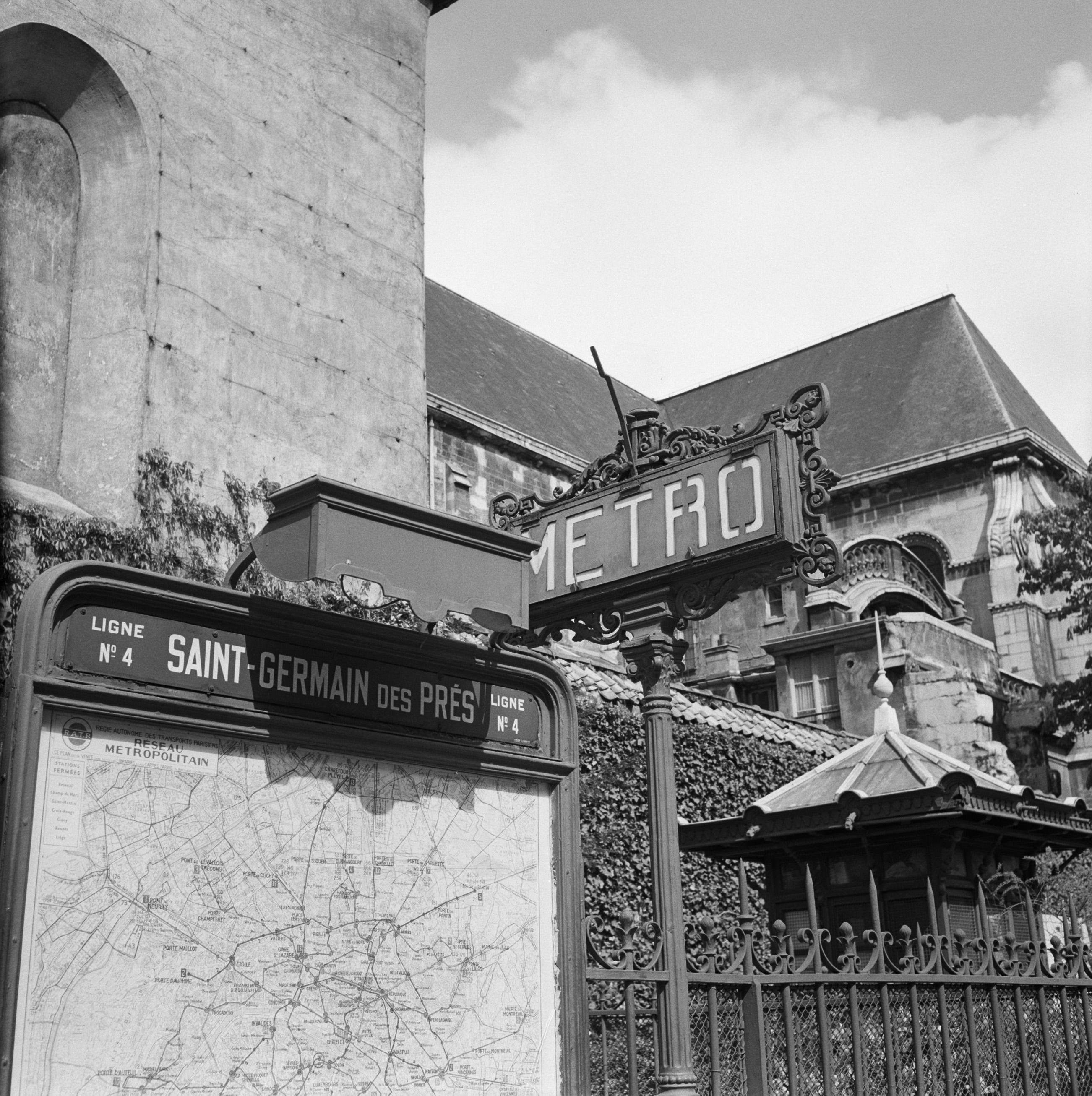
Access 1 in 1965

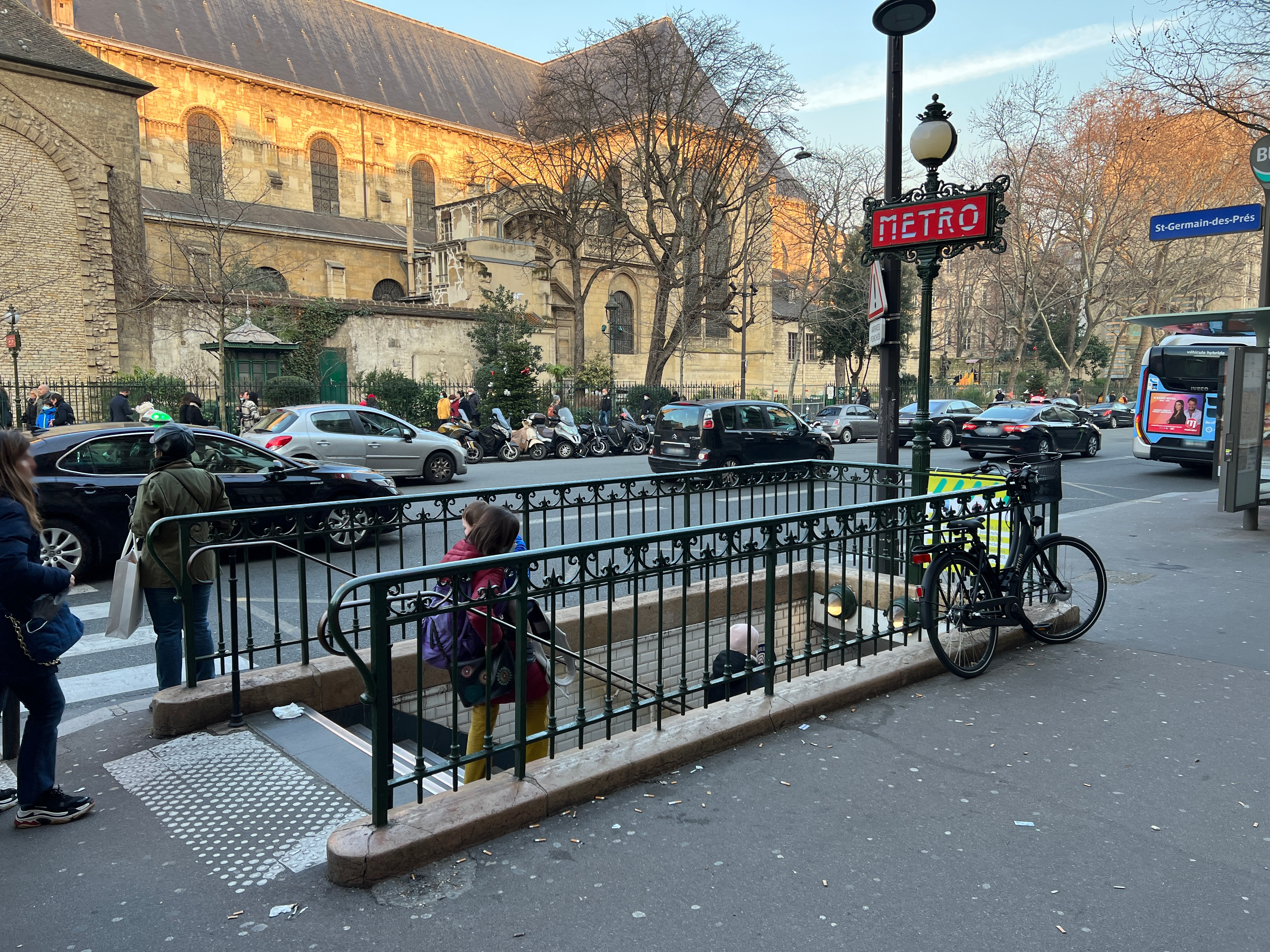
Access 2
