= Les Deux Magots =

Café in the 6th arrondissement of Paris

Coordinates: 48.854°N 2.3332°E

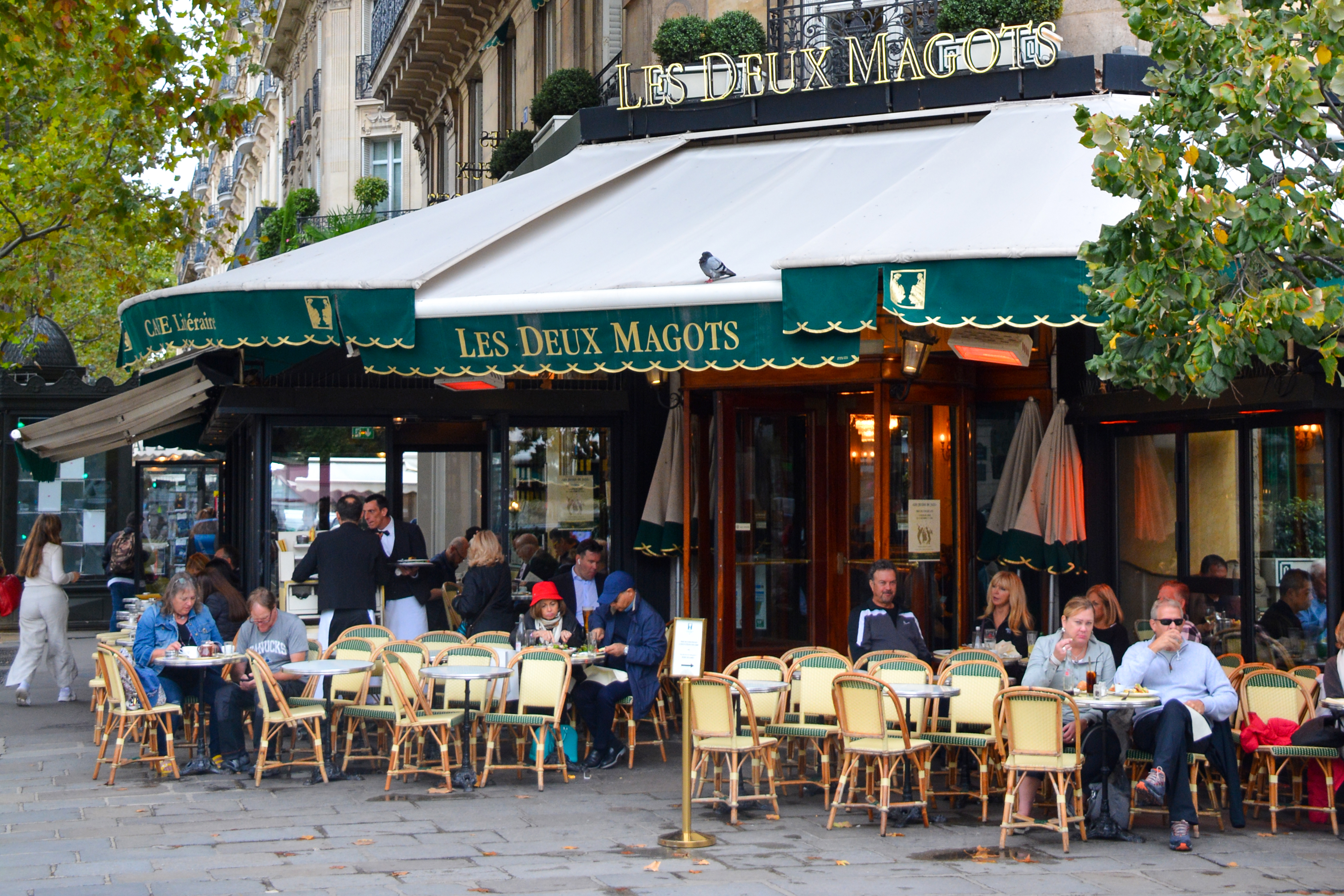
Les Deux Magots

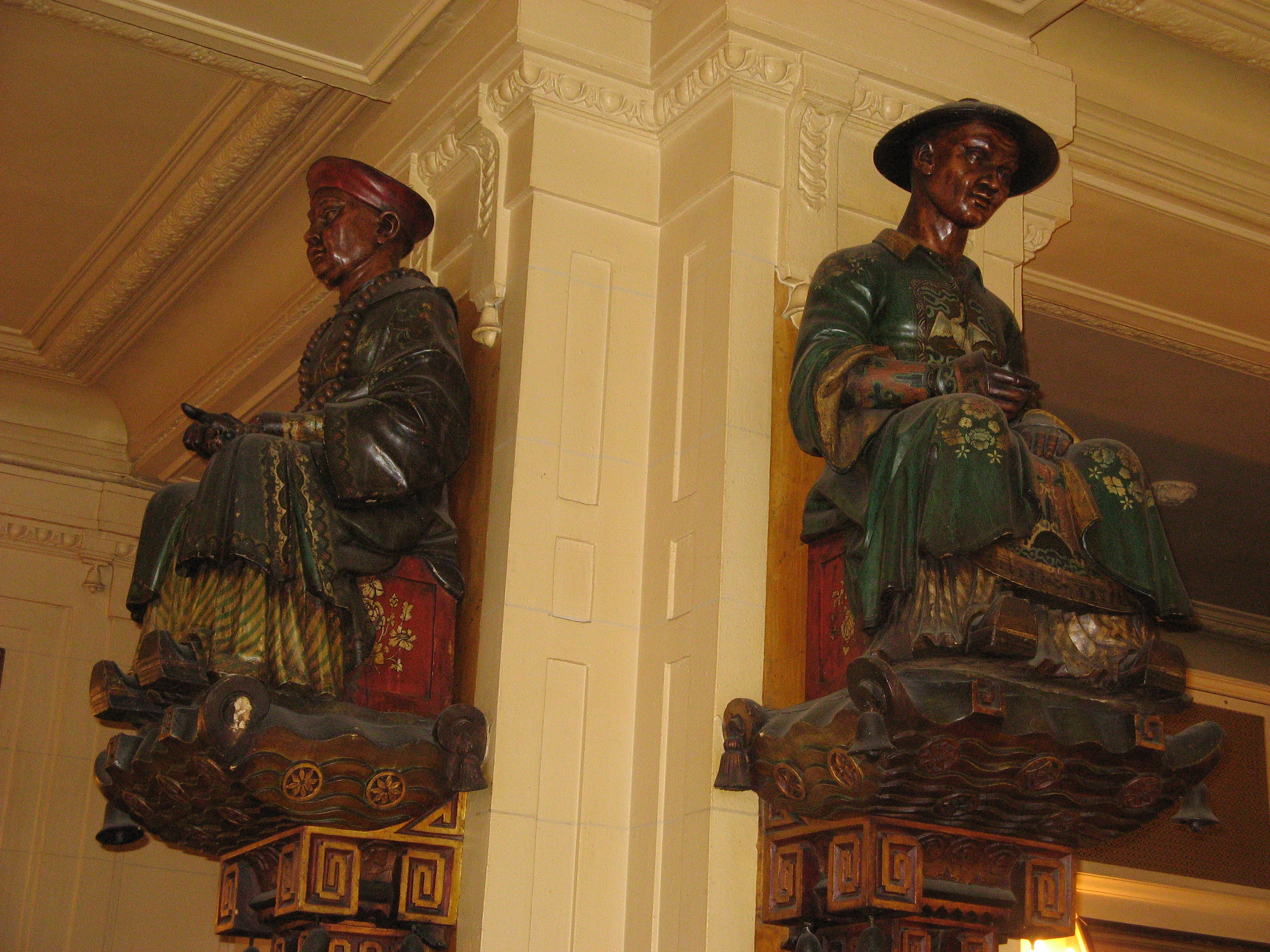
The "Deux Magots" inside the café

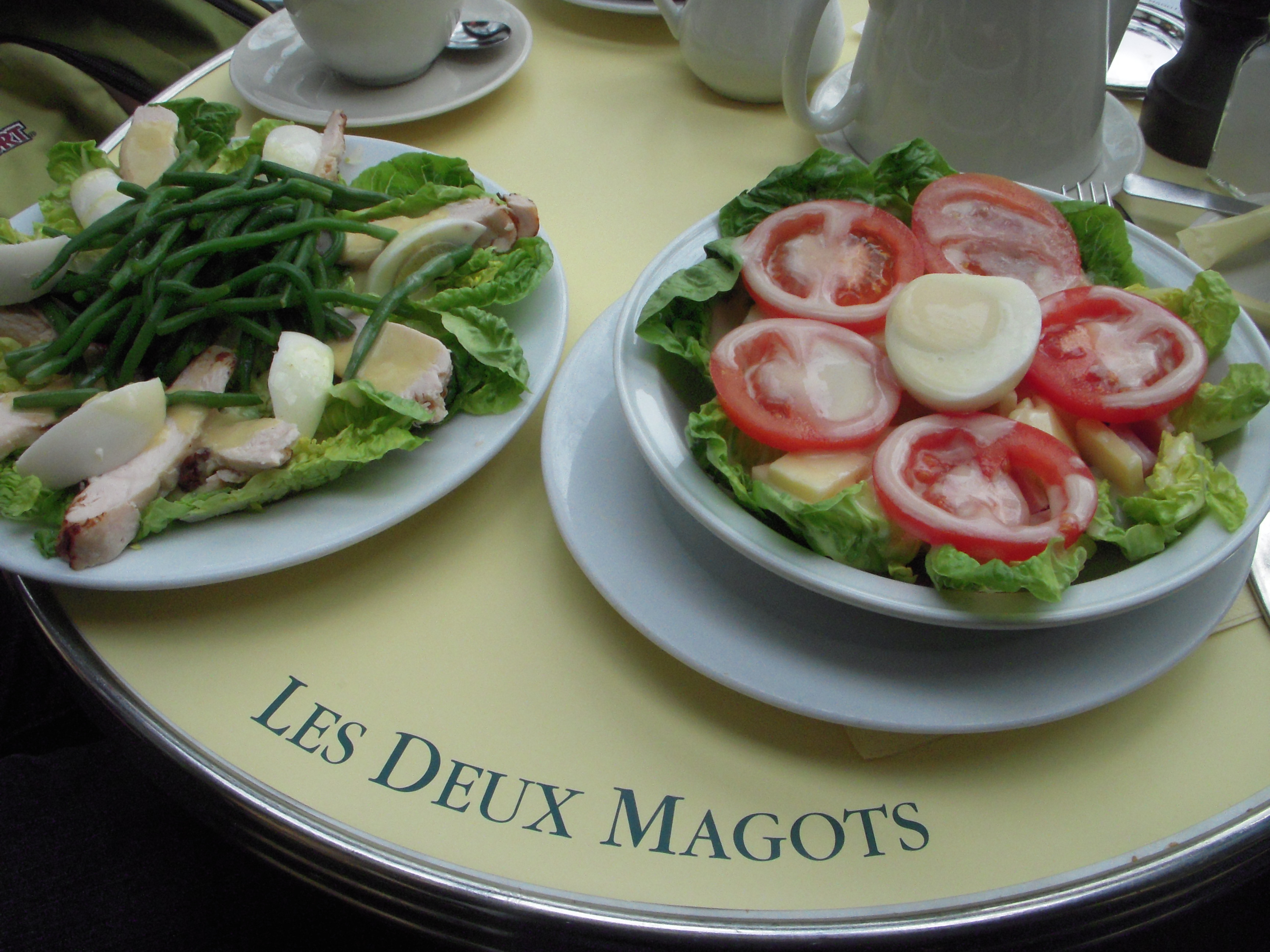
Lunch at Les Deux Magots, April 8, 2010

Les Deux Magots (French pronunciation: [le dø maɡo]) is a café and restaurant situated at 6, Place Saint-Germain-des-Prés in Paris' 6th arrondissement, France. It once had a reputation as the main rendezvous of the literary and intellectual elite of the city. It is now a popular tourist destination. Its historical reputation is derived from the patronage of Surrealist artists and intellectuals to the likes of Simone de Beauvoir and Jean-Paul Sartre, as well as young writers at the time, such as Ernest Hemingway. Other patrons included Albert Camus, Pablo Picasso, James Joyce, Bertolt Brecht, Julia Child and the American writers James Baldwin, Chester Himes and Richard Wright. The New York Times has labeled the restaurant as the "most popular café in Paris."

The Deux Magots literary prize (Prix des Deux Magots) has been awarded to a French novel every year since 1933 at Les Deux Magots.

== Origin of the name ==
"Magot" literally means "stocky figurine from the Far East". The name originally belonged to a fabric and novelty shop at nearby 23 Rue de Buci, which moved to the current location in the Place Saint-Germain-des-Prés in 1873. The shop sold silk lingerie and took its name from a popular 19th century play, Les Deux Magots de la Chine. In 1884, the business changed to a café and liquoriste, but kept the name. The current restaurant's two statues represent Chinese "mandarins", "magicians", or "alchemists" gazing over the room.

Auguste Boulay bought the business in 1914 for 400,000 francs when it was on the brink of bankruptcy. Boulay's son added glass walls to allow in more light. The original statues have remained since the store opened.

Catherine Mathivat, great-great-granddaughter of Auguste Boulay, started to work in the café in 1993, and took over when her father died in 2012. In 2016, the café led a study revealing that 60% of its clientele were international tourists. In 2017, Mathivat partnered with her cousin Jacques Vergnaud to redesign the café and reclaim its Parisian clientele. In 2022, the Saint-Germain café made a revenue of 15 million euros.

The business opened a Tokyo Les Deux Magots café in 1989, then a Riyadh and a São Paulo Les Deux Magots in 2023. There are plans for new cafes in Cape Town, Prague, London and Guangzhou.

== References in literature and popular culture ==
=== In literature ===
- Les Deux Magots appears in The Chariot Makers, by Steve Matchett, in which the author describes Les Deux Magots as: "the first café in the quarter to be blessed by the morning sun. Its clientele pay a healthy premium for drinking there, it’s only fitting they should be the first to catch the warmth of the new day."
- The café figures prominently in Abha Dawesar's novel That Summer in Paris (2006).
- The café is the setting for a pivotal scene in the 1998 novel The Magic Circle by Katherine Neville. The novel was displayed for several months in the windows of Les Deux Magots.
- In the 2009 novel El hombre que amaba a los perros (The Man who Loved Dogs) by Leonardo Padura it is one of the places where Trotsky's assassin, Ramon Mercader, spends time while waiting to be sent to Mexico to complete his assignment.
- The café features prominently in Marco Missiroli's Atti osceni in luogo privato, about the early life of "Libero Marsell", whose father will be a patron of the cafè and will befriend writer Albert Camus before the author's death.
- The café is the site of an important event in China Miéville's novella The Last Days of New Paris (2016).
- Lolita, chapter 5, part 1.
- A Moveable Feast, chapter 8 by Ernest Hemingway.
- Lorna Goodison, At Lunch in Les Deux Magots, in Oracabessa
- Les Deux Magots is referred to in patron James Joyce's Finnegans Wake on page 562.
- Les Deux Magots is referenced as a meeting place in Kristin Hannah's The Nightingale on page 347.

=== In graphic novels ===
- A café with a similar name (Café Deux Magots) is seen in the fictional town of Morioh, Japan in Diamond is Unbreakable, the fourth part of JoJo's Bizarre Adventure.

=== In art ===
- 1959 color photograph by Saul Leiter.
- 1967 figurative painting by Jean-François Debord.

=== In film ===
- Several scenes in the 1949 movie The Man on the Eiffel Tower take place here.
- The café features in Jean Eustache's 1973 film The Mother and the Whore.
- The café features in the 2011 film The Intouchables, in a scene in which Philippe (François Cluzet) and Driss (Omar Sy) stop there after a wee-hours stroll along the Seine, meant to ease Philippe's suffering in the middle of the night.

=== In television ===
- The café features in a scene in the final episode of NBC sitcom The Good Place.
- The café is shown while filmed in a week-long tour in Paris of The Late Late Show with Craig Ferguson during June, 2011.
- The cafe is featured in a scene of ‘’Emily in Paris’’ season 5.

=== In music ===
- The café features centrally as the main location of the tale told in the song “A Rose Is A Rose” by singer Poe, with many of the café‘s more famous clientele name-checked in the lyrics, each enraptured with the enigmatic Jezebel.

=== In podcasts ===
- Cocoa from Les Deux Magots is featured heavily in The Amelia Project.

== See also ==
- Café de Flore
- La Hune
- List of bakery cafés
- Place Jean-Paul-Sartre-et-Simone-de-Beauvoir
