= Sword of François I =

Medieval sword made for Francis I of France

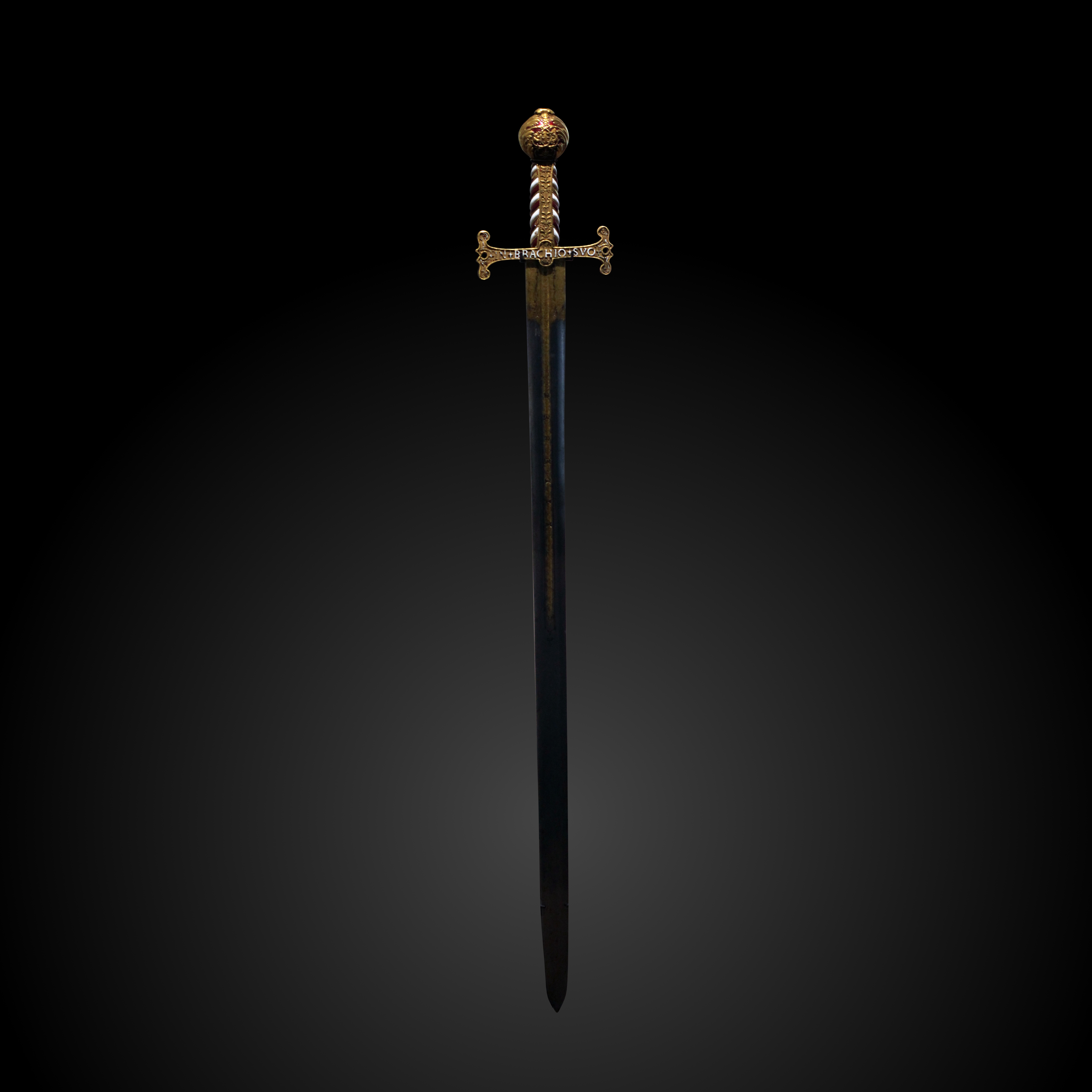
- General view of the sword

Service history
- In service: from 1510–1515 to 1525
- Used by: Francis I of France
- Wars: Italian War of 1521–26

Production history
- Designed: 1480 (blade); 1510–1515 (handle)
- Manufacturer: P.A. Cataldo (blade)
- Produced: 1510–1515
- No. built: 1

Specifications
- Blade type: Knightly sword
- Hilt type: cruciform hilt

The sword of François I is a ceremonial sword made c. 1510–1515 from a blade forged around 1480 and a custom-made handle. It was captured by the Spanish at the Battle of Pavia and brought back to France in 1808 by Murat. It is currently on display at the Musée de l'Armée at Les Invalides, in Paris.

== History ==
According to contemporary chronicle, Juan Aldana took the sword as a spoil of war on 25 February 1525 after the Battle of Pavia. In 1585, his son sold it to King Philippe II. In 1808, as France occupied Spain, Napoléon ordered Murat to bring the sword back to France, where he put it on display in his study at the Tuileries Palace.

== Description ==
The sword is richly ornate, featuring a salamander, personal symbol of François I. As it lacks a royal crown, the sword is thought to have been made before François I became King of France. The guard features a verse from Magnificat, « Fecit potentiam in brachio suo », which translates as "He put strength in his arm".

Details of the handle

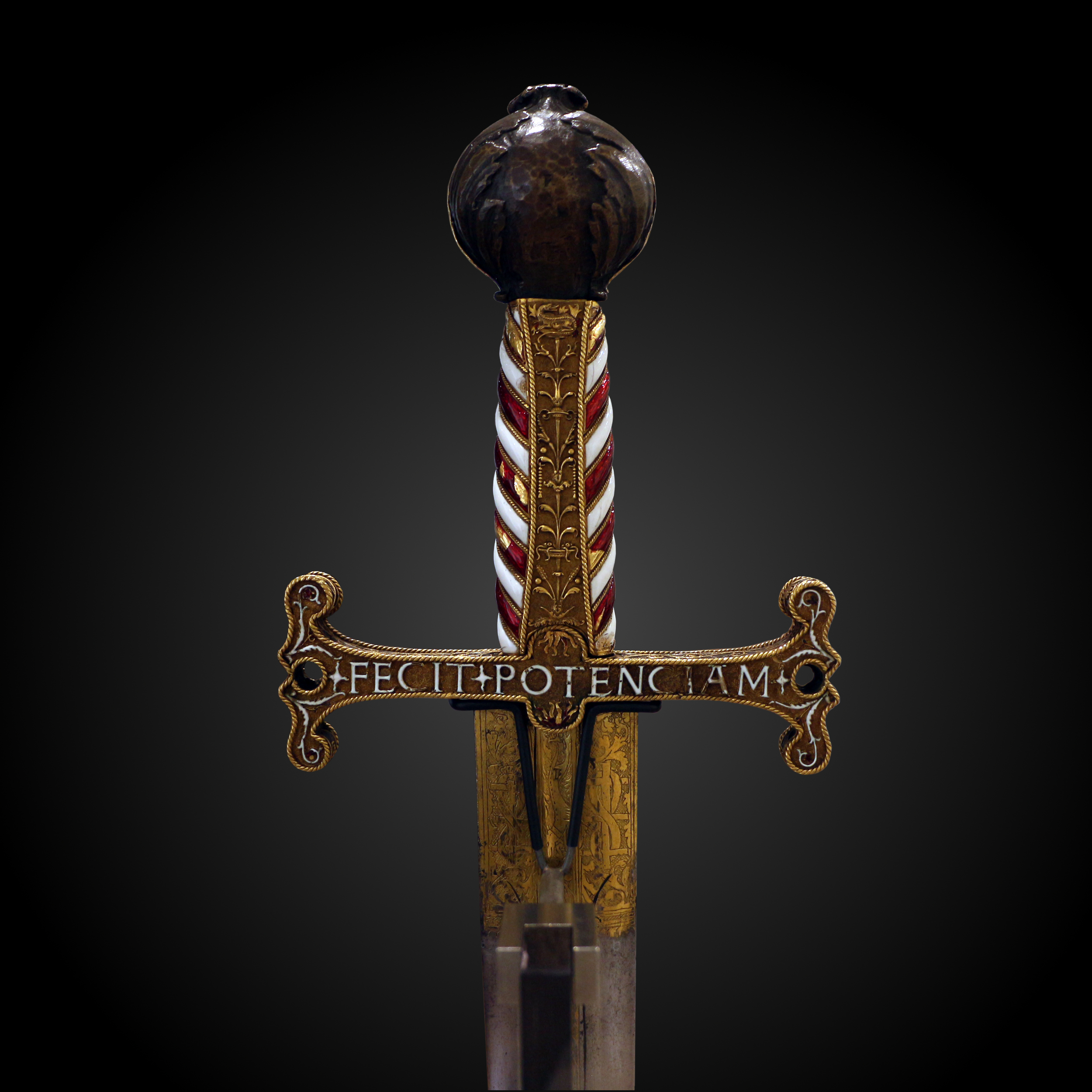
Fecit potentiam

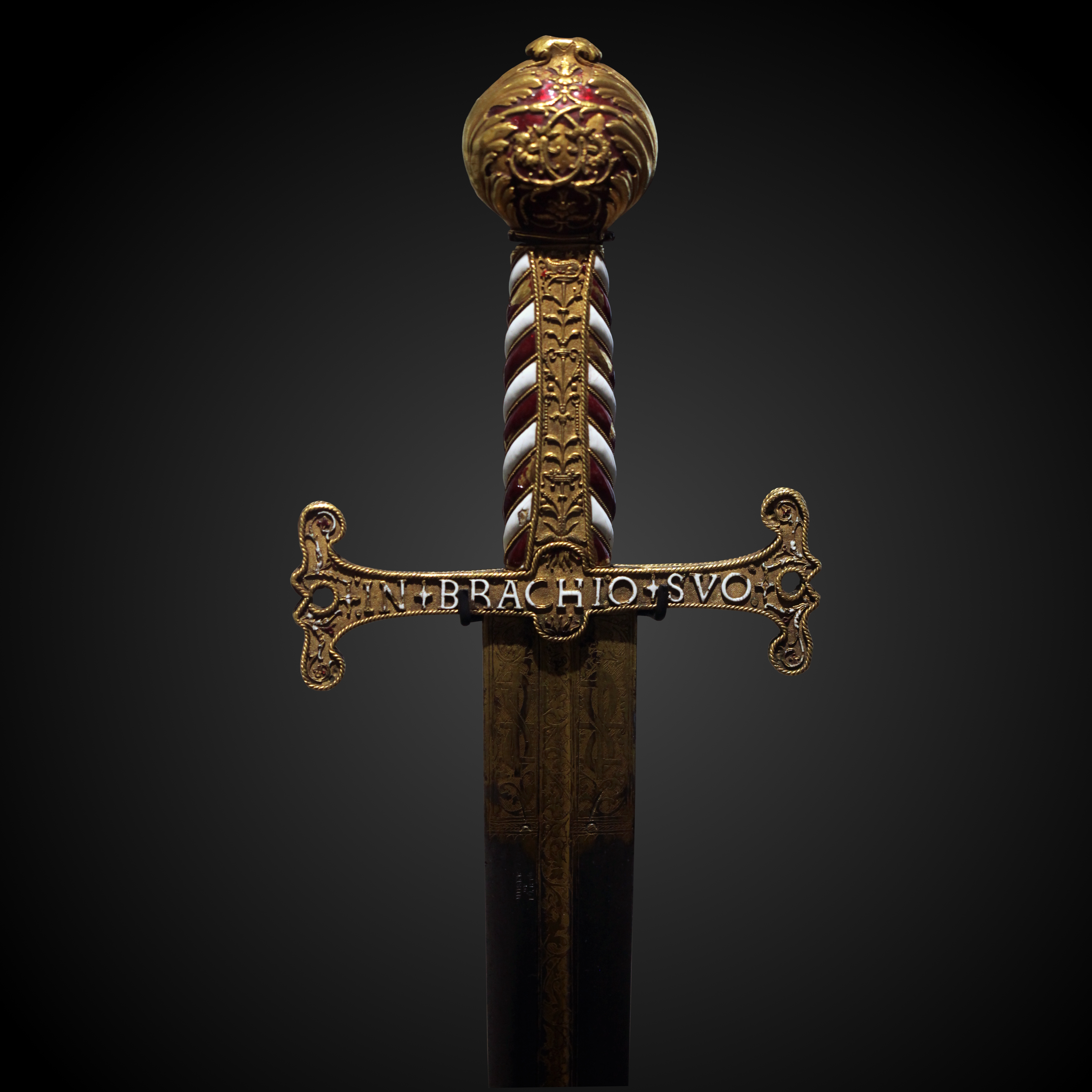
in brachio suo

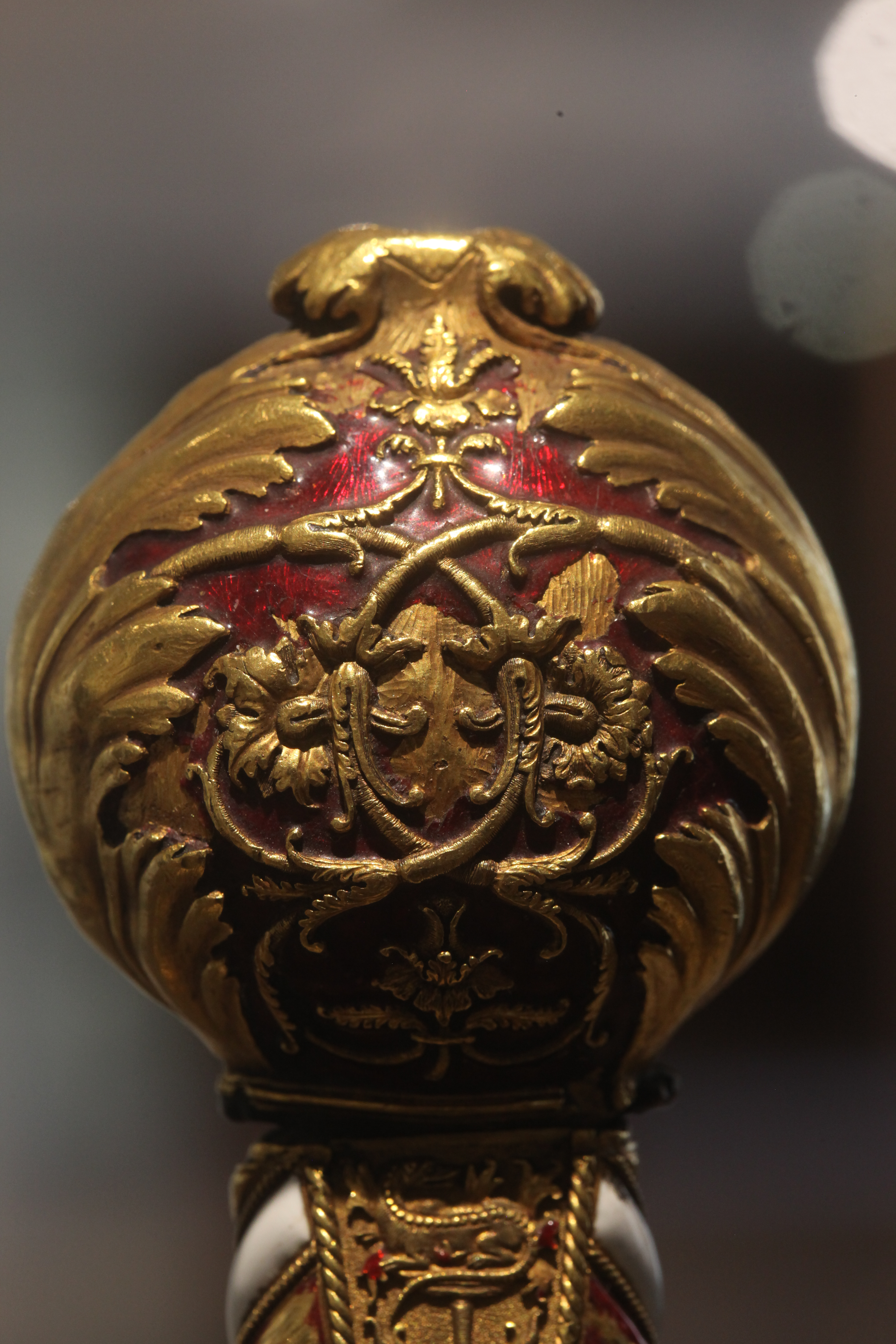
Detail of the pommel, with the salamander visible just underneath
