= Charade (1963 film) =

1963 film by Stanley Donen

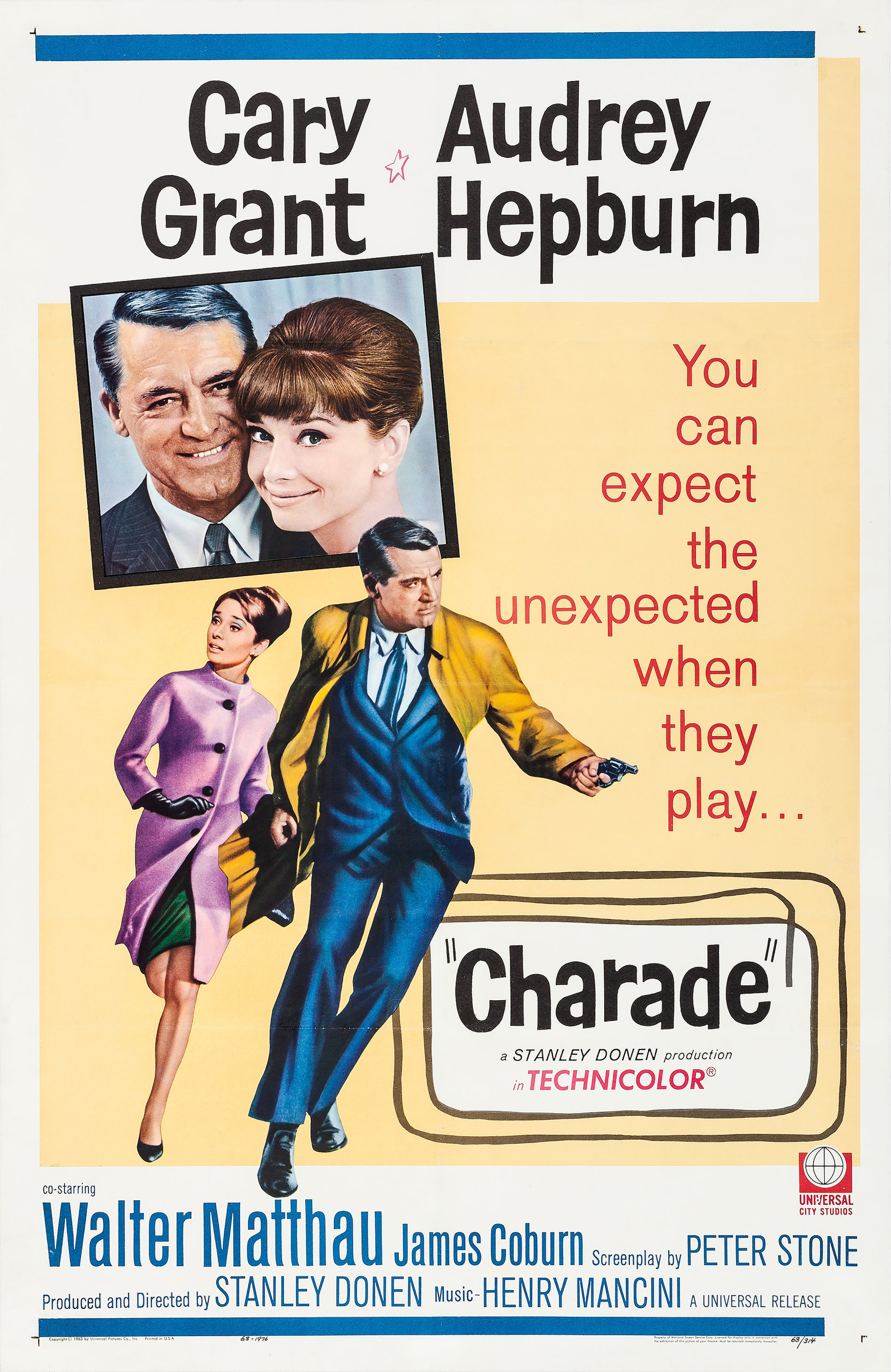
- Theatrical release poster
- Directed by: Stanley Donen
- Screenplay by: Peter Stone
- Story by: Peter Stone; Marc Behm
- Based on: The Unsuspecting Wife by Peter Stone with Marc Behm
- Produced by: Stanley Donen
- Starring: Cary Grant; Audrey Hepburn; Walter Matthau; James Coburn
- Cinematography: Charles Lang
- Edited by: James Clark
- Music by: Henry Mancini; Song: Henry Mancini (music); Johnny Mercer (lyrics)
- Production company: Stanley Donen Films
- Distributed by: Universal Pictures
- Release dates: September 24, 1963 (Washington, D.C.); December 5, 1963 (United States)
- Running time: 113 minutes
- Country: United States
- Language: English
- Budget: $3 million
- Box office: $13.4 million

Charade is a 1963 American romantic screwball comedy mystery film produced and directed by Stanley Donen, written by Peter Stone and Marc Behm, and starring Cary Grant and Audrey Hepburn. The cast also features Walter Matthau, James Coburn, George Kennedy, Dominique Minot, Ned Glass and Jacques Marin. It spans three genres: suspense thriller, romance and comedy.

Charade was praised by critics for its screenplay and the chemistry between Grant and Hepburn. It was filmed on location in Paris and contains animated titles by Maurice Binder. Henry Mancini's score features the popular theme song "Charade".

In 2022, the film was selected for preservation in the United States National Film Registry by the Library of Congress as "culturally, historically, or aesthetically significant".

== Plot ==
Charade (full film)

Charles Voss's body is tossed off the Paris-Bordeaux train. Unaware, on holiday in the French Alps, Regina "Reggie" Lampert, an American expatriate, tells her friend Sylvie that she is divorcing her secretive and deceitful husband, Charles Lampert. Peter Joshua, a charming American, flirts with her at the resort.

On her return, Reggie finds her Paris apartment stripped bare. Charles auctioned off their belongings, raising $250,000 ($4.6 million in current dollars), then was murdered. The police inspector gives Reggie Charles's travel bag containing a letter addressed to her, a ship ticket to Venezuela, four passports in multiple names and nationalities, and miscellaneous personal items. Only three unknown men, the inspector, Sylvie, and Reggie attend Charles's funeral. Leopold Gideon looks over the corpse; Tex Panthollow uses a hand mirror to see if he is breathing; Herman Scobie sticks a pin into the corpse to confirm Charles is dead.

Reggie is summoned to meet CIA administrator Hamilton Bartholomew at the American Embassy. She learns that during World War II, the three men at the funeral, along with Charles Voss (her husband’s true identity) and Carson Dyle, assigned by the OSS to deliver $250,000 in gold to the French Resistance, instead stole it. Wounded in a German ambush, Carson was left behind. Charles double-crossed the others, taking all the gold. The three survivors—and the U.S. government—are after the missing money. Hamilton insists Reggie has the money, though she might not know it—and that she is in great danger.

Finding Reggie, Peter helps her move into a hotel near him, Sylvie, and her young son, Jean-Louis. Leopold and Tex separately threaten her for the money. When Herman attacks her in her hotel room, Peter fights him off, then pursues Herman to a hotel room where he confronts Leopold, Tex, and Herman for deviating from their plan. Herman phones Reggie, warning her that Peter is conspiring with the others. Confronted by Reggie, Peter explains he is Carson Dyle's brother, Alexander, covertly trying to bring his brother's killers to justice. Consulting Hamilton, Reggie agrees to play along with Alexander Dyle to help recover the money.

Holding Alexander at gunpoint, Herman again demands the money; Alexander disarms him and leaves him hanging precariously from the roof. The three criminals kidnap Jean-Louis, again demanding the money. Alexander claims Reggie doesn't have the money, but he suggests one of them may be concealing having found the money until the others give up. They search each other's rooms but only find Herman drowned in the bathtub. Hamilton calls Reggie to inform her that his investigation revealed Carson Dyle had no brother. When she confronts Alexander, he admits he is Adam Canfield, a professional thief. Although frustrated by his dishonesty, Reggie instinctively trusts him. Leopold subsequently is found murdered in an elevator.

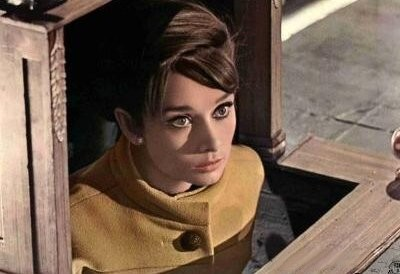
Reggie hiding in the prompt box

At the location of Charles's last known appointment, Adam and Tex each realize Charles bought rare stamps he placed on the envelope in his travel bag. Racing to Reggie's hotel room, they discover the stamps missing. Reggie suddenly realizes the stamps she gave Jean-Louis for his collection are valuable. Jean-Louis traded the stamps to a dealer, who returns the stamps, valued at $250,000, to Reggie.

Returning to the hotel, Reggie finds Tex's body with a plastic bag over his head; Tex wrote the name "Dyle" on the floor before dying. Convinced Adam is the murderer, Reggie telephones Hamilton, who instructs her to meet him at the Palais-Royal. Adam chases Reggie as she arrives to meet Hamilton; when Adam claims Hamilton is Carson Dyle, Reggie doubts who to trust. Carson admits he is obsessed with revenge and the treasure. Running from them both, Reggie runs into an empty theater and hides in the prompt box. When Carson is about to shoot her, Adam activates a trapdoor under him, sending him crashing to the floor far beneath him.

The next day, Reggie and Adam go to the embassy, where Reggie discovers Adam is Brian Cruikshank, a U.S. Treasury agent responsible for recovering stolen government property. He proposes marriage to Reggie, who says she hopes they have lots of boys, who will all be named after him.

== Cast ==
- Cary Grant as Brian Cruikshank (alias Peter Joshua, Alexander Dyle and Adam Canfield)
- Audrey Hepburn as Regina "Reggie" Lampert
- Walter Matthau as Carson Dyle (alias Hamilton Bartholomew)
- James Coburn as Tex Panthollow
- George Kennedy as Herman Scobie
- Dominique Minot as Sylvie Gaudel
- Ned Glass as Leopold W. Gideon
- Jacques Marin as Inspector Edouard Grandpierre
- Paul Bonifas as Mr. Felix, the stamp dealer
- Thomas Chelimsky as Jean-Louis Gaudel

== Production ==
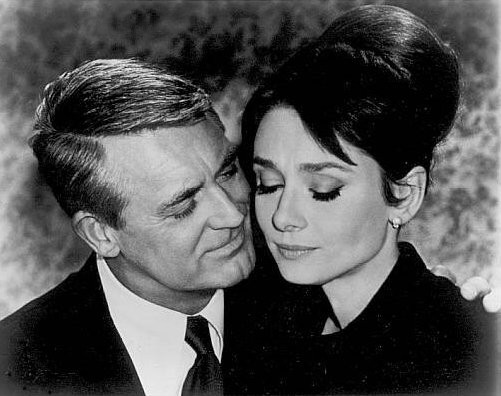
Grant and Hepburn

=== Writing and casting ===
When screenwriters Peter Stone and Marc Behm submitted their script The Unsuspecting Wife around Hollywood, they were unable to sell it. Stone then turned it into a novel, retitled Charade, which found a publisher and was serialized in Redbook magazine. The serial caught the attention of the same Hollywood companies that had passed on it earlier. The film rights were quickly sold to producer/director Stanley Donen. Stone then wrote the final shooting script, tailored to Cary Grant and Audrey Hepburn, with Behm receiving story co-credit.

At the end of the film, Hepburn lists Grant's aliases, concluding, "I hope we have a lot of boys and we can name them all after you". In the Criterion Collection's 1999 commentary, Stone laments the fact that the music swells to mask his "best closing line". Donen tells him that he can say it now and get his own back.

Cary Grant, who turned 59 years old during filming, was sensitive about the 25-year age difference between Audrey Hepburn (33 at the time of filming) and himself, and was uncomfortable with their romantic interplay. To address his concerns, the filmmakers agreed to add dialogue that has Grant's character comment on his age and Regina being portrayed as the pursuer.

=== Filming ===
Production began in Paris on October 22, 1962. About half the film was shot on location, with interiors being filmed at Studios de Boulogne. The scenes in which Grant and Hepburn first meet were shot in January 1963 in a ski resort in Megève, in the French Alps. Hepburn had just filmed Paris When It Sizzles the previous summer in a number of the same locations in Paris, but difficulties with the earlier production caused it to be released four months after Charade.

When the film was released at Christmas time 1963, Audrey Hepburn's line, "At any moment we could be assassinated", was overdubbed with, "At any moment we could be eliminated", due to the recent assassination of President John F. Kennedy. Official video releases of the film have since restored the original dialogue, although some public domain copies of the original release still carry the dubbed line.

=== Locations ===
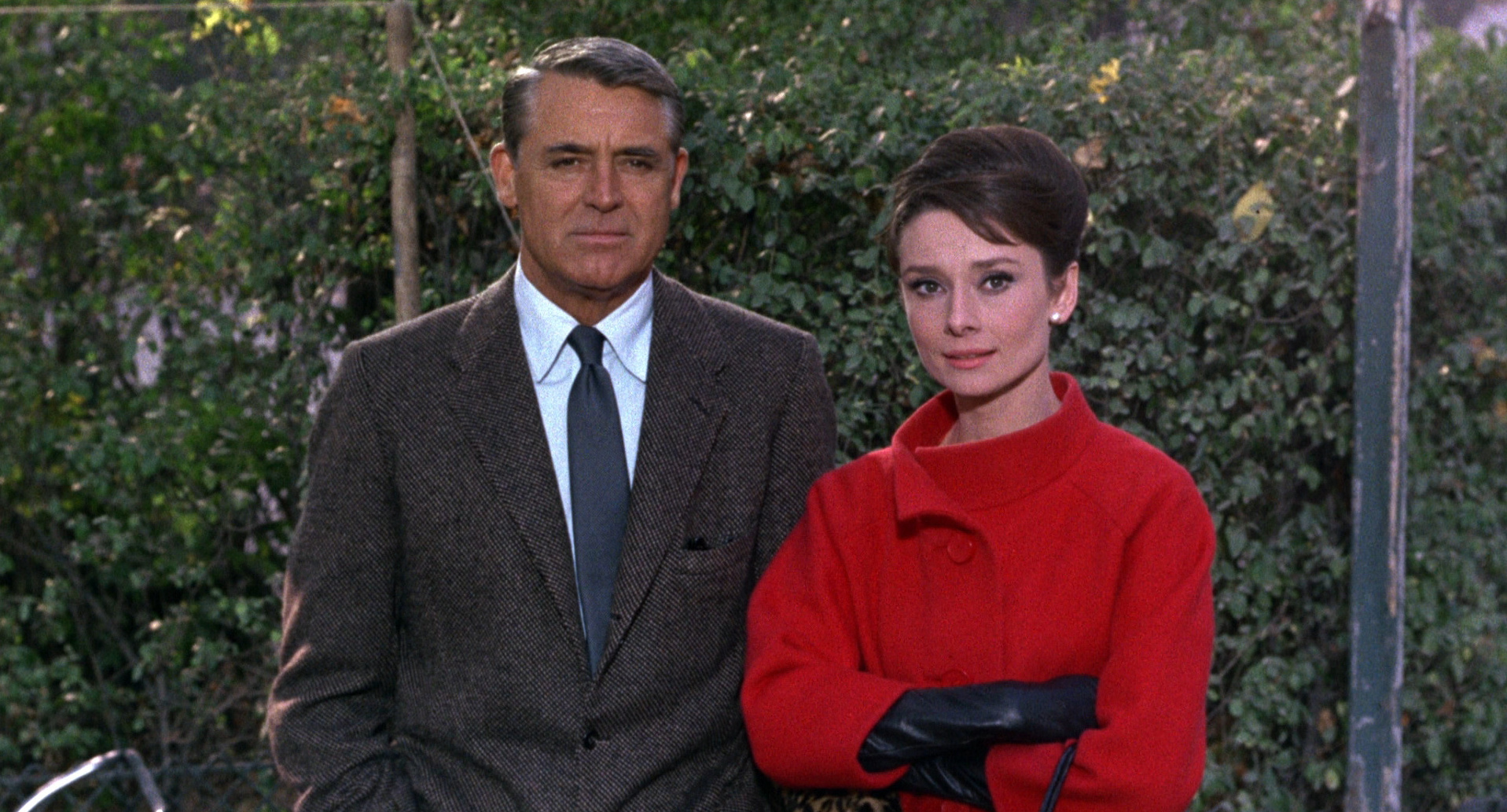
Grant and Hepburn at the Théâtre du vrai Guignolet

All locations are in Paris, except for the railway and ski resort.

- Paris–Bordeaux railway (Charles Lampert's murder)
- Résidence Le Mont d'Arbois, Megève (Alpine hotel)
- 5 Avenue Velasquez (Lampert apartment)
- Théâtre Vrai Guignolet, Carré Marigny (puppet theatre)
- 24 Rue Censier (Hôtel Saint-Jacques)
- Les Halles (meeting with Bartholomew at the market)
- 11 Rue Scribe (American Express building)
- Quai de Montebello (walking along the river)
- UNESCO Headquarters (EURESCO headquarters)
- Carré Marigny (stamp market)
- Varenne station (interior of the Saint-Jacques station)
- Palais-Royal (chase in the colonnade)
- Comédie-Française (the theatre)
- Embassy of the United States, Paris

Studio scenes filmed at the Billancourt Studios.

== Release ==
The film was slated for a Christmas release, but Universal consented to a one-time advance screening on September 24 at the Palace Theatre in Washington, D.C., which was a benefit to raise money to help low-income children stay in school. Singer Ella Fitzgerald performed and, according to Jet magazine, $50,000 was raised (equivalent to over a half-million dollars in 2026).

Charade premiered as the Christmas film at Radio City Music Hall in New York on December 5, 1963. It ended up breaking the box office record at the theater. It went on wide release soon after, and was the highest-grossing film in the country for five weekends straight in January, and ended up the fourth highest grossing film of 1964.

=== Copyright ===
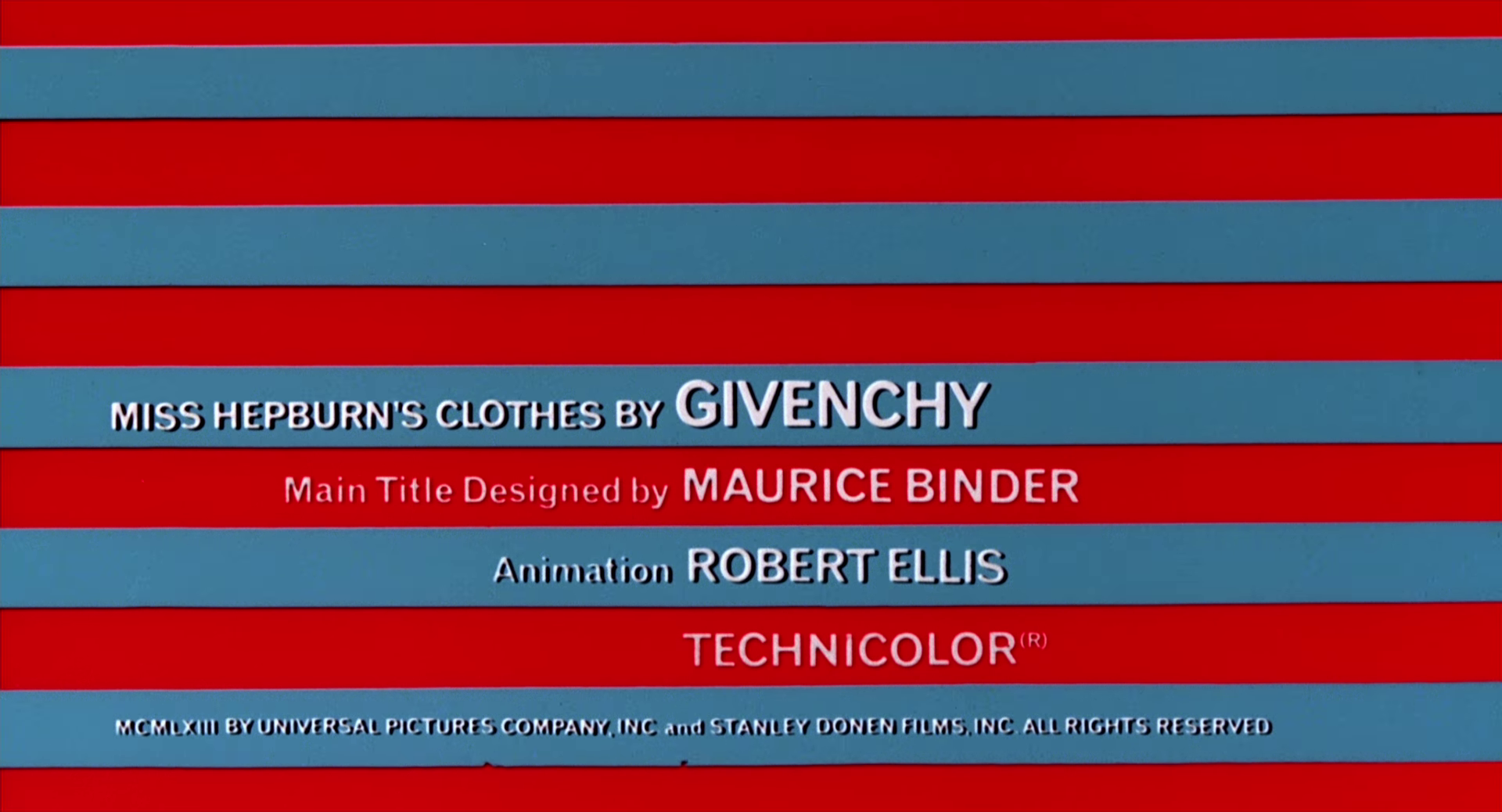
The defective copyright notice

Before 1978, U.S. law required works to include a copyright notice to have legal protection. The film includes a notice reading "MCMLXIII BY UNIVERSAL PICTURES COMPANY, INC. and STANLEY DONEN FILMS, INC. ALL RIGHTS RESERVED", but this fails to meet this requirement, because it does not include the word "copyright", the abbreviation "copr.", or the symbol "©". Consequently, the film entered into the public domain in the United States immediately upon its release. As a result, copies from film prints of varying quality have been widely available on VHS, DVD and Blu-ray, in addition to official releases of the film from Universal, as well as The Criterion Collection. The film is also available for free viewing on YouTube and free download at the Internet Archive. However, although the film is in the public domain, the original music remains under copyright if used outside the context of the film.

== Reception ==
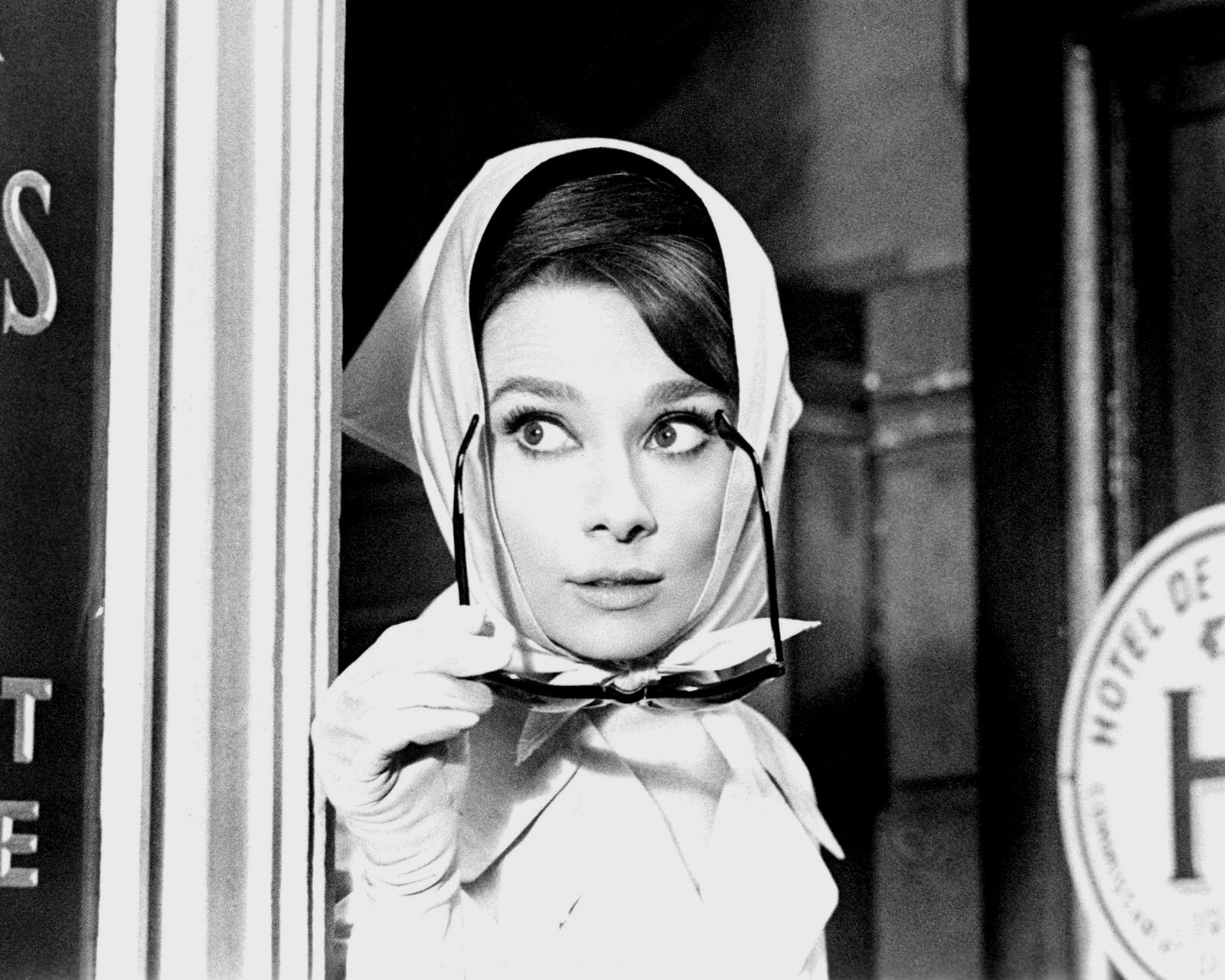
Hepburn publicity photo

Charade received positive reviews from contemporaries, as well as from 21st-century critics. At Rotten Tomatoes, the film has an approval rating of 95% based on 55 reviews. The consensus reads: "A globetrotting caper that prizes its idiosyncratic pieces over the general puzzle, Charade is a delightful romp with Cary Grant and Audrey Hepburn's sparkling chemistry at the center of some perfectly orchestrated mayhem." On Metacritic, the film has a weighted average score of 83 out of 100 based on 16 critics, indicating "universal acclaim".

In a review published on January 6, 1964, in The New York Times, Bosley Crowther criticized the film for its "grisly touches" and "gruesome violence", but also praised it for its screenplay, with its "sudden twists, shocking gags, eccentric arrangements, and occasionally bright and brittle lines", as well as Donen's direction, said to be halfway between 1930s screwball comedy and North by Northwest by Alfred Hitchcock, which also starred Grant.

In a Time Out review, the film was rated positively, with the assertion that it is a "mammoth audience teaser [...] Grant imparts his ineffable charm, Kennedy (with metal hand) provides comic brutality, while Hepburn is elegantly fraught".

While reviewing the Blu-ray version of the film, Chris Cabin of Slant Magazine gave the film a three-and-a-half rating out of five, calling it a "high-end, kitschy whodunit" and writing that it is a "riotous and chaotic take on the spy thriller, essentially, but it structurally resembles Agatha Christie's And Then There Were None", as well as describing it as "some sort of miraculous entertainment".

== Awards and nominations ==
Award	Category	Nominee(s)	Result	Ref.
Academy Awards	Best Song	"Charade"; Music by Henry Mancini; Lyrics by Johnny Mercer	Nominated	
British Academy Film Awards	Best Foreign Actor	Cary Grant	Nominated	
British Academy Film Awards	Best British Actress	Audrey Hepburn	Won	
David di Donatello Awards	Golden Plate		Won	
Edgar Allan Poe Awards	Best Motion Picture Screenplay	Peter Stone	Won	
Golden Globe Awards	Best Actor in a Motion Picture – Musical or Comedy	Cary Grant	Nominated	
Golden Globe Awards	Best Actress in a Motion Picture – Musical or Comedy	Audrey Hepburn	Nominated	
Laurel Awards	Top Comedy		3rd Place	
Laurel Awards	Top Male Comedy Performance	Cary Grant	2nd Place	
Laurel Awards	Top Female Comedy Performance	Audrey Hepburn	3rd Place	
Laurel Awards	Top Song	"Charade"; Music by Henry Mancini; Lyrics by Johnny Mercer	5th Place	
Writers Guild of America Awards	Best Written American Comedy	Peter Stone	Nominated	

== See also ==
- List of American films of 1963
- The Truth About Charlie, a 2002 remake of Charade
