= Saint-François-Xavier station =

Metro station in Paris, France

Saint-François-Xavier
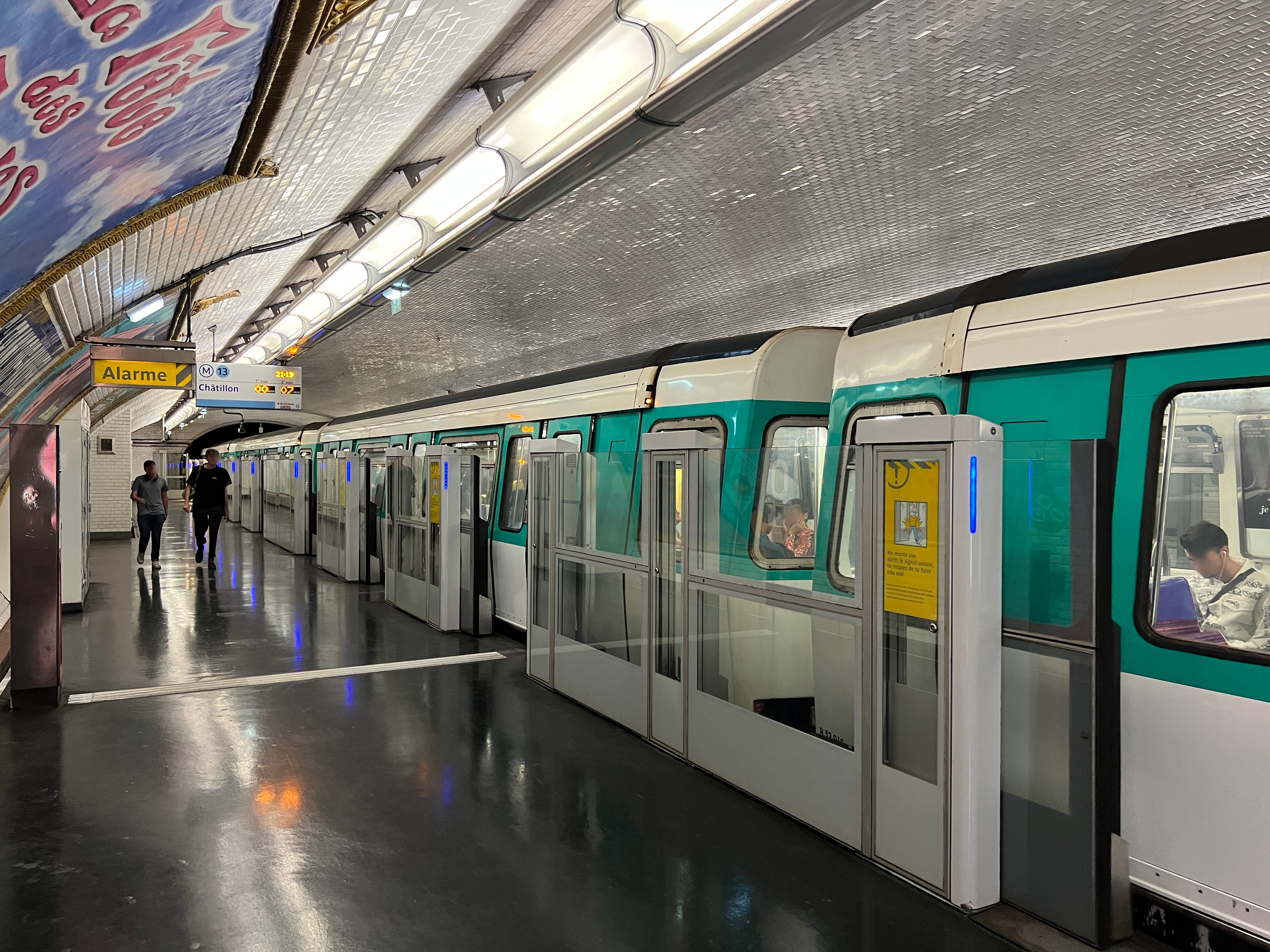
- MF 77 at Saint-François-Xavier

General information
- Location: 7th arrondissement of Paris; Île-de-France; France
- Coordinates: 48°51′07″N 2°18′52″E
- System: Paris Métro station
- Owner: RATP
- Operator: RATP
- Line: Paris Metro Paris Metro Line 13
- Platforms: 2 (side platforms)
- Tracks: 2

Construction
- Accessible: no

Other information
- Station code: 0206
- Fare zone: 1

History
- Opened: 30 December 1923

Passengers
- 1,213,378 (2021)

Services
Preceding station	Paris Metro	Following station
Duroc towards Châtillon–Montrouge	Line 13	Varenne towards Les Courtilles or Saint-Denis–Université
Location
- Location within Paris

Saint-François-Xavier (French pronunciation: [sɛ̃ fʁɑ̃swa ɡzavje]) is a station on line 13 of the Paris Métro in the 7th arrondissement. It is named after the nearby Église Saint-François-Xavier, a church dedicated to Saint Francis Xavier (1506–1562), co-founder of the Society of Jesus.

== History ==
The station opened on 20 December 1923 as part of the original section of line 10 between Invalides and Croix Rouge (a ghost station east of Sèvres - Babylone; it was closed permanently during World War II). On 27 July 1937, as part of a reconfiguration of lines 8, 10, and the old line 14, the section of line 10 between Invalides and Duroc was transferred to become the first section of old line 14, linking Invalides and Porte de Vanves. On 9 November 1976, the old line 14 was merged with line 13 when it was extended from its former southern terminus at Saint-Lazare.

The station's corridors and lighting were renovated as part of the "Renouveau du métro" programme by the RATP on during the 2000s. In 2012, platform screen doors were installed on the platforms, together with eleven other stations on the line in an attempt to increase the average speed of trains and reduce track-related incidents due to the line's heavy traffic.

In 2019, the station was used by 1,701,996 passengers, making it the 266th busiest of the Métro network out of 302 stations.

In 2020, the station was used by 812,792 passengers amidst the COVID-19 pandemic, making it the 265th busiest of the Métro network out of 305 stations.

In 2021, the station was used by 1,213,378 passengers, making it the 260th busiest of the Métro network out of 305 stations.

== Passenger services ==
=== Access ===
The station has a single access at Place André-Tardieu. It was designed by Joseph Marie Cassien-Bernard in a neo-classical style and his name is engraved on it. It is installed with two Dervaux lampposts, a rare occurrence on the network where most accesses only have a single one installed, a feature it shares with Mairie des Lilas on Line 11.

=== Station layout ===
Street level
B1	Mezzanine
Platform level	Side platform, doors will open on the right
Platform level	Northbound	← toward Les Courtilles or Saint-Denis – Université (Varenne)
Platform level	Southbound	toward Châtillon – Montrouge (Duroc) →
Platform level	Side platform, doors will open on the right

=== Platforms ===
The station has a standard configuration with two tracks surrounded by two side platforms.

=== Other connections ===
The station is also served by lines 82, 86, and 92 of the RATP bus network.

== Nearby ==
Nearby sites of interest include:

- Église Saint-François-Xavier
- Former headquarters of the Regional Council of Île-de-France, now in Saint-Ouen-sur-Seine
- La Pagode, a Japanese-themed cinema
- Lycée et collège Victor-Duruy
- Ministry of the Overseas
- Dutch Embassy, Paris

== Gallery ==
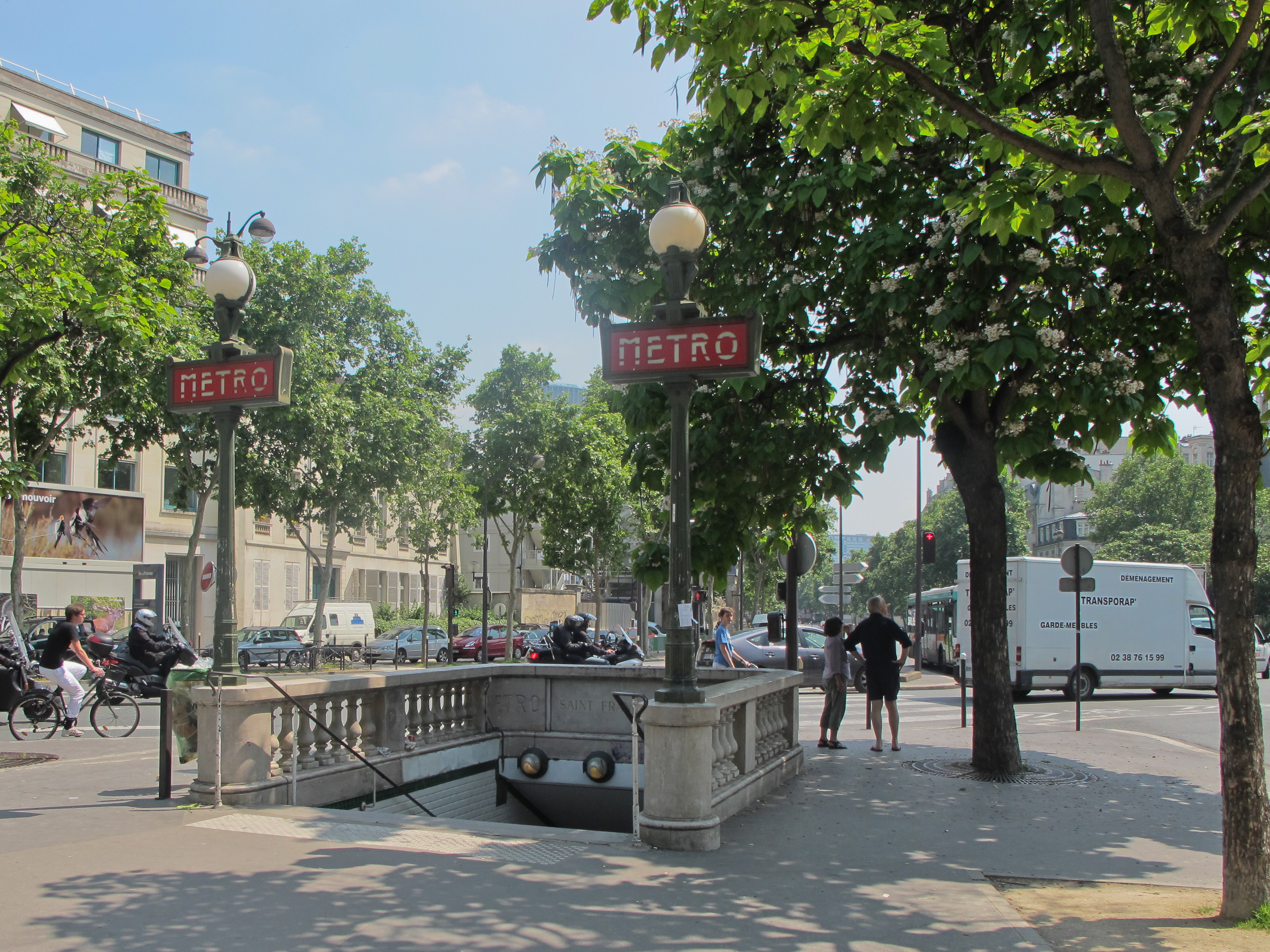
Access at Place André-Tardieu

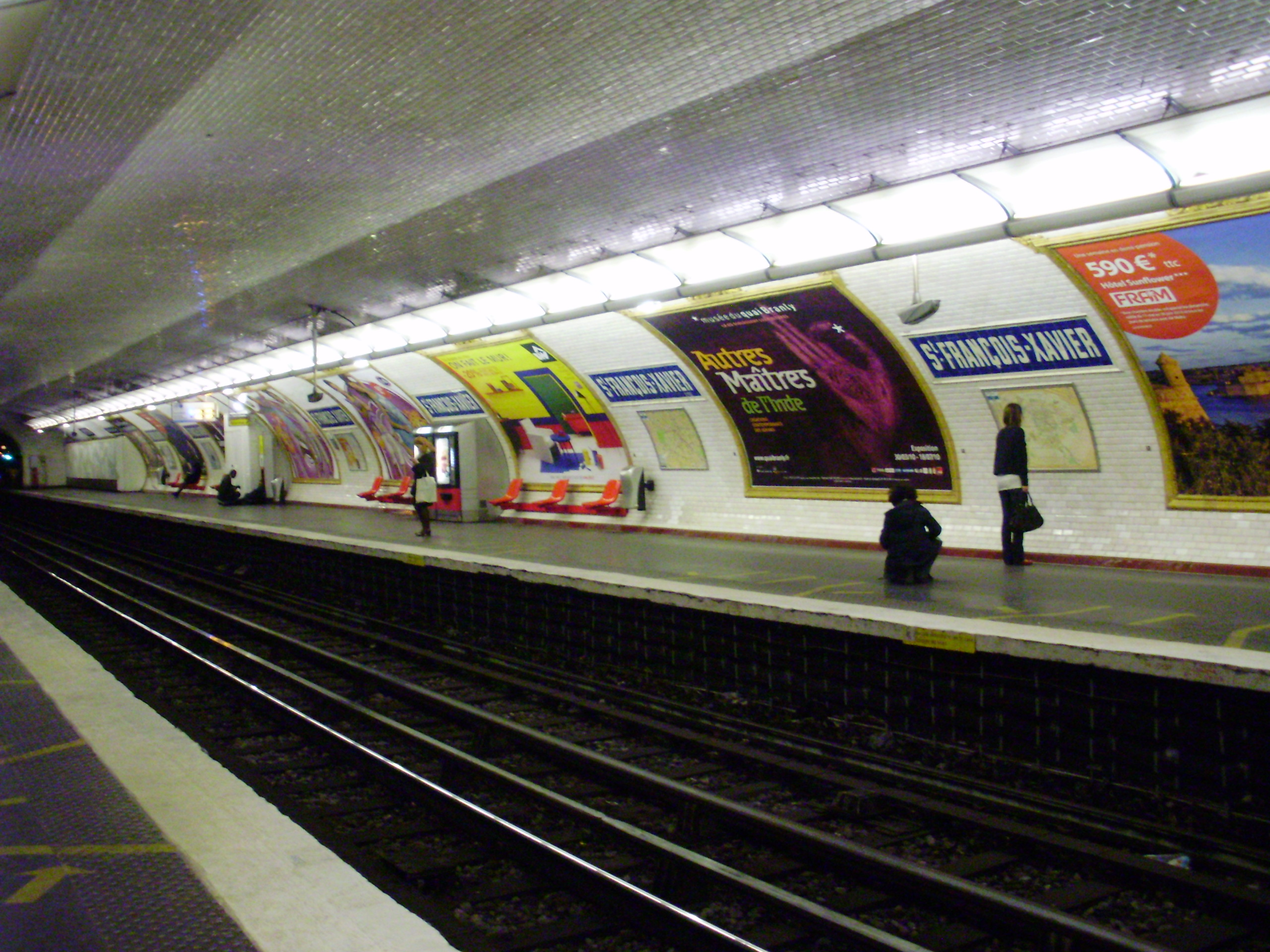
Saint-François-Xavier before the installation of platform screen doors
