= Deadly Circuit =

Mortelle Randonnée
- Directed by: Claude Miller
- Written by: Jacques Audiard; Michel Audiard; Marc Behm
- Based on: Eye of the Beholder by Marc Behm
- Produced by: Charles Gassot
- Starring: Michel Serrault; Isabelle Adjani
- Cinematography: Pierre Lhomme
- Edited by: Albert Jurgenson
- Music by: Carla Bley
- Distributed by: Compagnie Commerciale Française Cinématographique (CCFC); Groupement des Editeurs de Films (GEF)
- Release date: 1983
- Running time: 120 minutes
- Country: France
- Language: French

Mortelle Randonnée is a 1983 French thriller film inspired by the novel Eye of the Beholder by Marc Behm. Directed by Claude Miller, the film stars Michel Serrault as The "Eye" Beauvoir, Isabelle Adjani as Catherine, and Geneviève Page as Mme. Schmidt-Boulanger. The film had a total of 916,868 admissions in France.

Mortelle Randonnée was released in the United States as Deadly Circuit and in the United Kingdom as Deadly Run. The film was remade by Stephan Elliott in 1999 as Eye of the Beholder.

== Plot ==
The plot revolves around Catherine, a serial killer who seduces men and then murders them throughout countries in Europe. Catherine is trailed by the detective "The Eye" Beauvoir, who fantasizes that she is his long-lost daughter and disposes of her trail of corpses to foil the police. Catherine has a real love affair with a blind architect, Ralph Forbes, but Beauvoir's jealousy causes the man's death. Catherine returns to her psychotic killing. As the police dragnet closes in, Catherine and Beauvoir have their final showdown.

== Cast ==
- Michel Serrault as Beauvoir
- Isabelle Adjani as Catherine Leiris / Lucie Brentano
- Geneviève Page as Madame Schmidt-Boulanger
- Sami Frey as Ralph Forbes
- Macha Méril as Madeleine
- Patrick Bouchitey as Michel de Meyerganz
- Jean-Claude Brialy as Voragine
- Étienne Chicot as Lerner
- Guy Marchand as The Pale Man
- Stéphane Audran as The Grey Lady

== Soundtrack ==
Music for the film was composed by (and traditional tunes arranged by) Carla Bley, performed by The Carla Bley Band.

== Reception ==
The film was commercially unsuccessful, generating only 916,868 admissions in France, but gradually acquired a cult status in its native country. For years, it was shown on the French television in a version cut by 25 minutes. This version was released on DVD in the U.S. by Fox Lorber in 2003. The restored two-hour version was released in France on DVD in 2007, and on Blu-ray in 2016, after which L’Express said the film "deserves to be rediscovered". Télérama called it "a black diamond", "the most stylized, the most beautiful, and the most literary of all French thrillers."

Time Out called it "an intriguing thriller" and "a colourful if not altogether successful study in obsession and guilt transference." It also praised the performances and said "Serrault is magnificent, as always." TV Guide said "Miller inverts the typical cat-and-mouse thriller conventions to produce a treatise on parental loss." Roy Armes wrote: "What is remarkable about Mortelle randonnée is the extent to which the lushly assured mise-en-scène and solid technical mastery are applied to a subject which is never remotely convincing or engaging."
