= Eye of the Beholder (film) =

1999 mystery thriller film

- American theatrical release poster
- Directed by: Stephan Elliott
- Screenplay by: Stephan Elliott
- Based on: The Eye of the Beholder by Marc Behm
- Produced by: Nicolas Clermont
- Starring: Ewan McGregor; Ashley Judd; Patrick Bergin; k.d. Lang; Jason Priestley; Geneviève Bujold
- Cinematography: Guy Dufaux
- Edited by: Sue Blainey
- Music by: Marius de Vries
- Production companies: Village Roadshow Pictures; Behaviour Communications; Behaviour Worldwide
- Distributed by: Seville Pictures (Canada); Metrodome Distribution (United Kingdom); Destination Films (United States); Roadshow Entertainment (Australia)
- Release dates: 28 August 1999 (South Korea); 28 January 2000 (United States); 9 June 2000 (United Kingdom); 10 August 2000 (Australia)
- Running time: 110 minutes
- Countries: Canada; United Kingdom; Australia
- Language: English
- Budget: $35 million
- Box office: $17.6 million

Eye of the Beholder is a 1999 mystery thriller film that employs magical realism. The film, based on Marc Behm's novel of the same name and a remake of Claude Miller's 1983 French thriller Deadly Circuit, was adapted and directed by Stephan Elliott. Starring Ewan McGregor and Ashley Judd, the film was an international co-production of Canada, the United Kingdom, and Australia.

== Plot ==
Stephen Wilson, a.k.a. "The Eye", is an intelligence agent whose current assignment is to track down the socialite son of his wealthy boss and find out what trouble he has gotten himself into. This leads him to Joanna Eris, a serial killer who is in a relationship with the son, whom she murders. Stephen is a witness to the crime.

At Penn Station in Pittsburgh, Eris commits yet another murder, enabling Stephen to finally corner her as he prepares to call for backup. Instead of turning her in, Stephen follows her in an effort to save her. He hallucinates constantly that his young daughter – whom he hasn't seen since his ex-wife took custody of her – is with him, and comes to think of Eris as a vulnerable, lost child.

Stephen follows her across the country and through several murders. He soon discovers that Eris and her father were very poor and he abandoned her, explaining her pathological hatred of men. When Eris helps Alexander, a rich blind man, in an airport, the two fall in love and become engaged, and might even live a happy life together. Stephen, who has witnessed all of this, is desperate to keep her from killing again. While the couple is on the way to the chapel for the wedding, Stephen shoots out one of their tires and the car crashes, killing Alexander. Stephen follows a grief-stricken Eris as she takes off for the desert.

A drug addict named Gary picks up Eris when her car dies and tries to seduce her; when she rebuffs his advances, he beats her unconscious and injects her with heroin so he can rape her while she is unconscious. Stephen arrives just in time to save Eris and gives Gary a thorough beating. Eris loses her unborn baby before fleeing to Alaska, with Stephen on her trail.

In Alaska, Stephen gains the courage to ask out Eris after frequenting the diner where she waitresses. They have a few drinks in the evening, becoming emotional, and Eris mentions where she would like to be buried when she dies. Eris says she has nothing to offer and that Stephen should leave her alone. The next day the police and Eris's psychiatrist come to the diner to arrest her. Stephen saves her, taking her to his trailer. There she is horrified to find out that he has been following her. She shoots him with Stephen's revolver though doesn't realize that he had loaded it with blank cartridges. She flees and he pursuits her on a motorcycle. As he gains on her, she crashes her car onto a lake, breaking through the ice. He pulls her out of the car and as she dies in his arms, she tells him "I wish you love."

== Cast ==
- Ewan McGregor as Stephen Wilson / "The Eye"
- Ashley Judd as Joanna Eris
- Patrick Bergin as Alexander Leonard
- k.d. lang as Hilary
- Jason Priestley as Gary
- Geneviève Bujold as Dr. Jeanne Brault
- Anne-Marie and Kaitlin Brown as Lucy Wilson
- David Nerman as Mickey Argyle
- Steven McCarthy as Paul Hugo
- Vlasta Vrána as Mr. Paul Hugo Sr.
- Janine Theriault as Nathy
- Don Jordan as Toohey

== Production ==
In May 1995, it was reported Lakeshore Entertainment had hired Elliott to direct Eye of the Beholder based on the book by Marc Behm. Earlier in the decade, director Elliott had found international success with the breakout hit The Adventures of Priscilla, Queen of the Desert , but the follow-up Welcome to Woop Woop flopped and so Eye of the Beholder was an attempt to try something of a completely different style.

In January 1997, the film was set up at MDP Worldwide with Elliott still attached. By December of that year, Ewan McGregor and Ashley Judd had been set to star in the film.

The 1999 documentary Killing Priscilla documents the troubled production of Eye of the Beholder, including candid moments of personal difficulties faced by Elliott. In one scene, he is hospitalised for anxiety disorder following a series of disagreements with the producers.

== Reception ==
=== Box office ===
Despite opening in the United States at number-one during the Super Bowl weekend and grossing $6 million on its opening weekend, Eye of the Beholder was a financial failure in theaters, grossing $16.5 million domestically and $1.1 million internationally for a worldwide total of $17.6 million against a $35 million budget.

=== Critical response ===
Eye of the Beholder was panned by critics. On the review aggregator website Rotten Tomatoes, 10% of 89 critics' reviews are positive, with an average rating of 3.4/10. The website's consensus reads: "Improbable and muddled." Metacritic, which uses a weighted average, assigned the film a score of 29 out of 100, based on 26 critics, indicating "generally unfavorable" reviews. CinemaScore gave it a rating of "F" based on surveys from general audiences. It is notable for being the first film in over fifteen years since Bolero to receive that grade, and one of the four films released in 2000 to receive that same grade, followed by Dr. T & the Women, Lost Souls (both released on October 13 that same year), and Lucky Numbers (released on October 27 that same year).
