= Carré Marigny =

Coordinates: 48.8690°N 2.3126°E

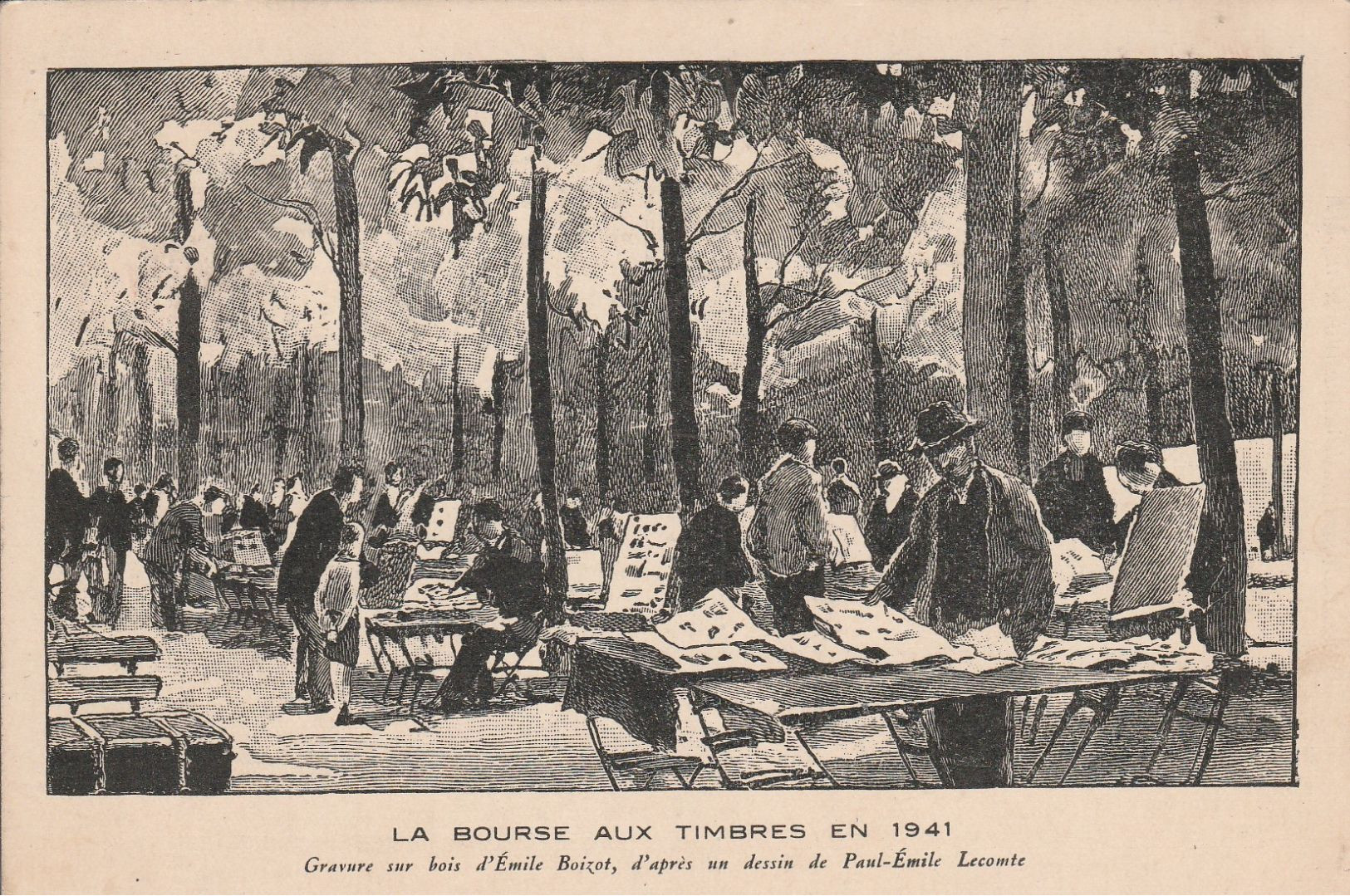
France open-air stamp market

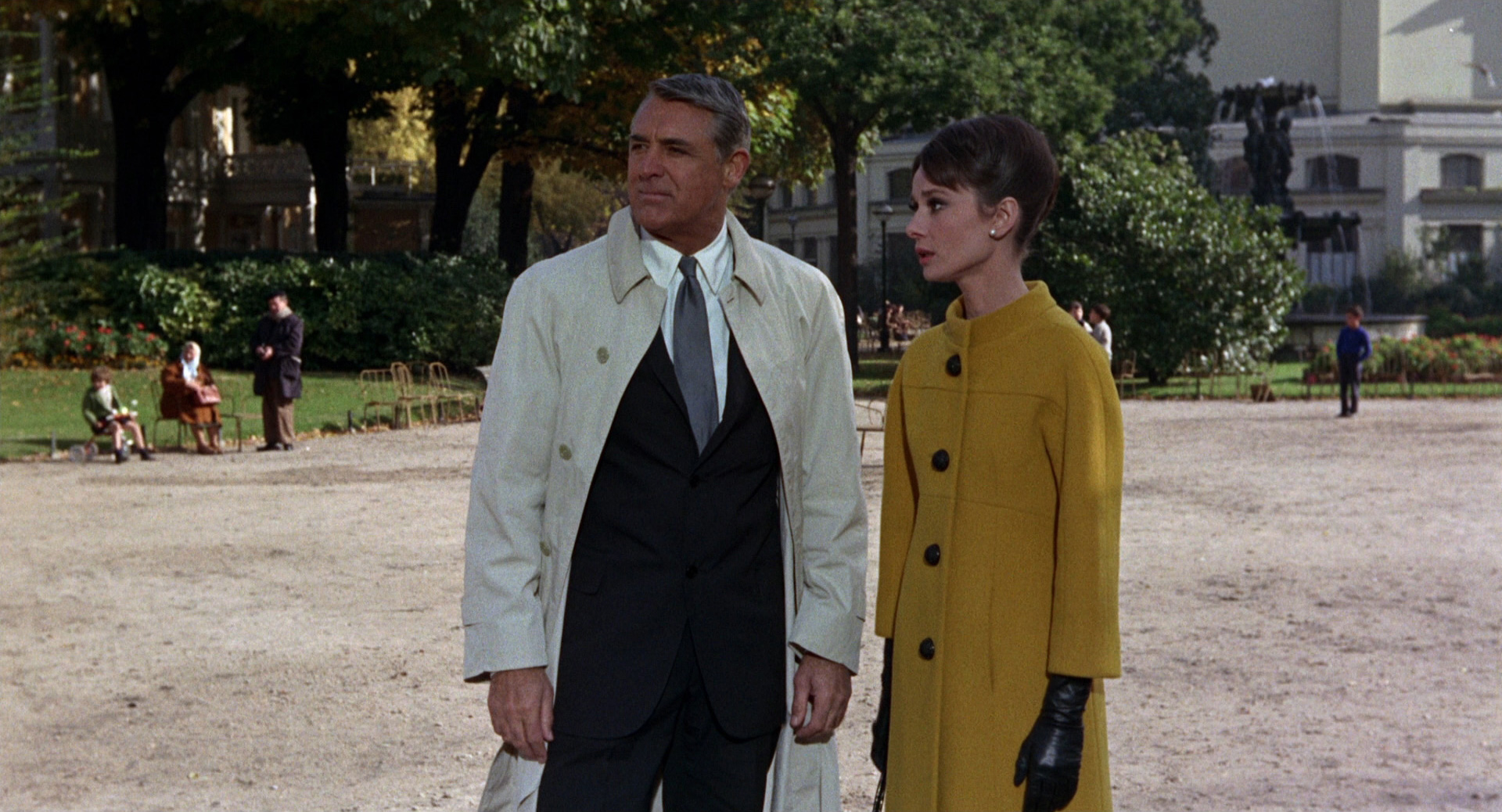
Audrey Hepburn and Cary Grant in the Carré Marigny in Charade

The Carré Marigny ("Marigny Square"), in the 8th arrondissement of Paris, is the site of an open-air market where postage stamps are bought and sold by hobbyists and serious philatelists.

The Carré Marigny was featured as a location in the Stanley Donen film, Charade (1963), starring Audrey Hepburn and Cary Grant.

== History ==
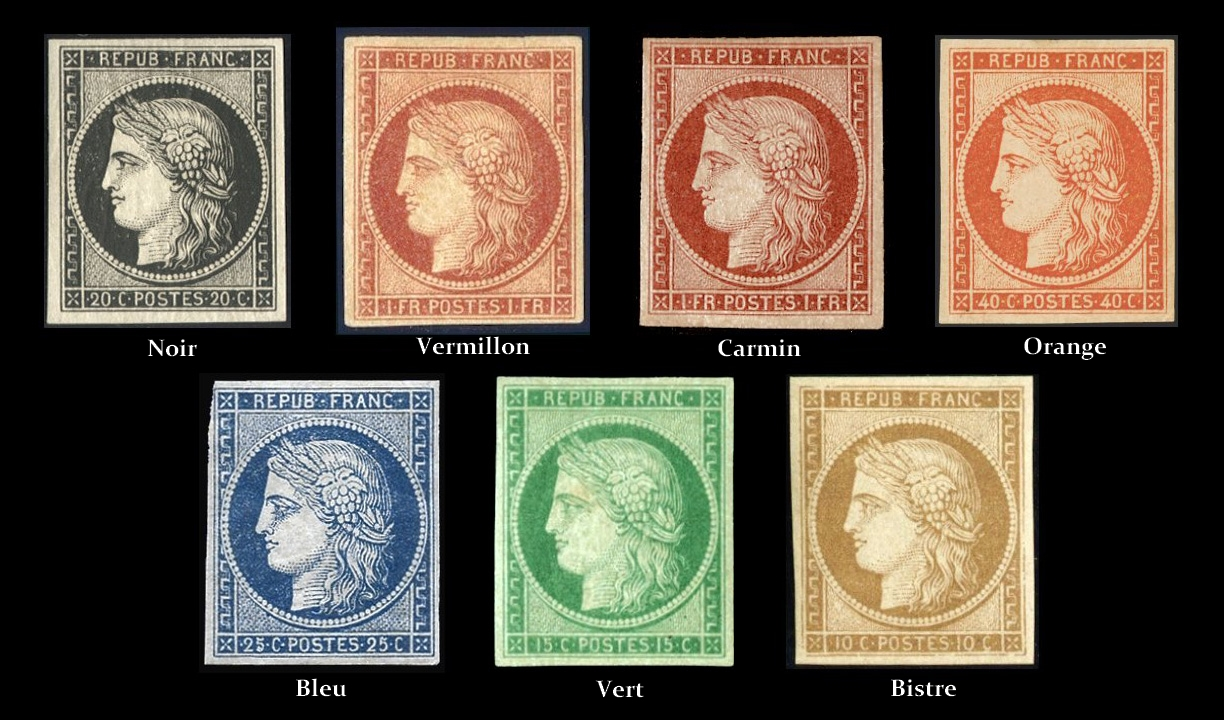
The Ceres issue, among the first French postage stamps, issued in 1849 and 1850

The tree-filled square off the Avenue Gabriel was named for Abel-François Poisson, marquis de Marigny, the able brother of Madame de Pompadour who was Director of Buildings for Louis XV. The space was donated to the city of Paris for this specific purpose by a rich stamp-collector after open-air philatelic exchanges had been evicted from the Palais-Royal in 1864 and from the Luxembourg Garden shortly thereafter. Officially, these evictions were provoked by the presence of éléments indésirables (unsavory types) who had attached themselves to the stamp-collecting enthusiasts. More likely, it was a matter of the Second Empire being uneasy about anything that attracted crowds of people whose political intentions were unknown and potentially subversive.

Within ten years after the 1849 appearance of the first postage stamp in France, the new pastime called philately had become a full-blown craze, first among university students, then among the public at large. Today there are more than fifty dealers in the Carré Marigny offering a large selection of stamps and postcards from all over the world, as well as phone cards. The stamp market is held on three days each week: Thursday, Saturday, and Sunday from 9 a.m. to 6:30 in the evening.

== The illicit stamps market ==
There are two sections to the stamps market in the Carré Marigny. Behind the Théâtre Marigny, (formerly the Bouffes Parisiens, that Jacques Offenbach conducted in 1855 before leaving for a larger venue), and along the Avenue Gabriel, between the Avenue Matignon and the Avenue de Marigny, are the licensed stamp vendors.

Along Avenue Matignon, there is a second category of vendor, comprising individuals known as the "wet feet", since, unlike the officially sanctioned sellers, they are not protected by a tent, and on rainy days, they find themselves ankle-deep in the puddles, exchanging postcards or stamps. They are tolerated even though they are unlicensed. This trade is overseen by police in civilian clothes, who will arrest offenders.

== Vendors of pins ==
For more than fifty years, people have been collecting pins of various kinds. These pins were originally meant to be worn on one's clothing as an indication of military rank or accomplishment, or as a token of affiliation with a certain organization or cause. So, there are pins representing membership in a fraternity or sorority, pins that represent honors like enrollment in an academic society, pins associated with the Olympic Games, pins with the names of cities or countries on them, pins for sporting teams, pins with cartoon and anime characters on them, etc. Whenever there are collectors, they find ways to buy, sell, and trade their wares. So, the pin-collectors invaded the Carré Marigny.

Since about 1990, collectors of pins have been coming to the 8th arrondissement to carry on their trade. They have done so, for the most part, without disturbing anyone, and they have claimed spots on the benches of the square, some distance away from the stalls of the stamp dealers. Among pin aficionados, the Carré Marigny became what it once was for stamp-collectors when stamp-collecting was relatively new: a mecca, an institution, known to collectors all over the city and throughout France. It became a venue where, at one time or another, every possible collectible pin (in all of the several thousand categories of collectible pins) was on offer. One could even determine the rarity of a piece by the frequency of its appearance in the Carré Marigny market.

Stamp dealers, jealous of these vendors for the vitality of their business and resentful that the pin dealers did not pay for a license, complained to the authorities and mounted a campaign of slander and half-truths against them. Soon, there was a crackdown, and all of the 'fringe' operators, the "wet feet" boys and the pin-collectors alike, were expelled. Currently, there are some stands where merchants sell postcards on the Avenue de Marigny, and the Avenue Matignon is overrun with people selling and trading telephone cards, but, for the most part, the pin vendors have gone elsewhere.

== Location ==
The Carré Marigny is located near metro stations Champs-Élysées - Clemenceau and Franklin D. Roosevelt. It is served by lines 1, 9, and 13.
