= Marc Behm =

American screenwriter and novelist (1925–2007)

Marc Behm (12 January 1925 in Trenton, New Jersey – 12 July 2007 in Fort-Mahon-Plage, France) was an American novelist, actor, and screenwriter, who lived as an expatriate in France. Behm co-wrote the screenplay for the Beatles' Help! (1965) and conceived the story for the film Charade (1963). His best and most well-known literary work is the crime novel Eye of the Beholder (1980), which was adapted twice for the screen, in 1983 and in 1999.

Behm developed a fascination for French culture while serving in the U.S. Army during World War II. He later had acting roles on several television programmes in France before moving there permanently.

== Bibliography ==
- The Queen of the Night (1977)
- The Eye of the Beholder (1980)
- The Ice Maiden (1983)
- Afraid to Death (1991)
- Off the Wall (1991)
- Seek To Know No More (1993)
- Crabs (1994)

== Filmography ==
- 1961: The Return of Doctor Mabuse - screenplay
- 1963: Charade - story
- 1965: Help! - story
- 1965: The Party's Over - screenplay
- 1966: Trunk to Cairo - screenplay
- 1967: The Blonde from Peking - screenplay
- 1969: The Thirteen Chairs - screenplay
- 1971: Someone Behind the Door - screenplay
- 1972: The Mad Bomber - screenplay
- 1974: Piaf - screenplay
- 1982: Hospital Massacre aka X-Ray - screenplay
- 1983: Deadly Circuit - book
- 1999: Eye of the Beholder - book
