= Varenne station =

Metro station in Paris, France

Varenne
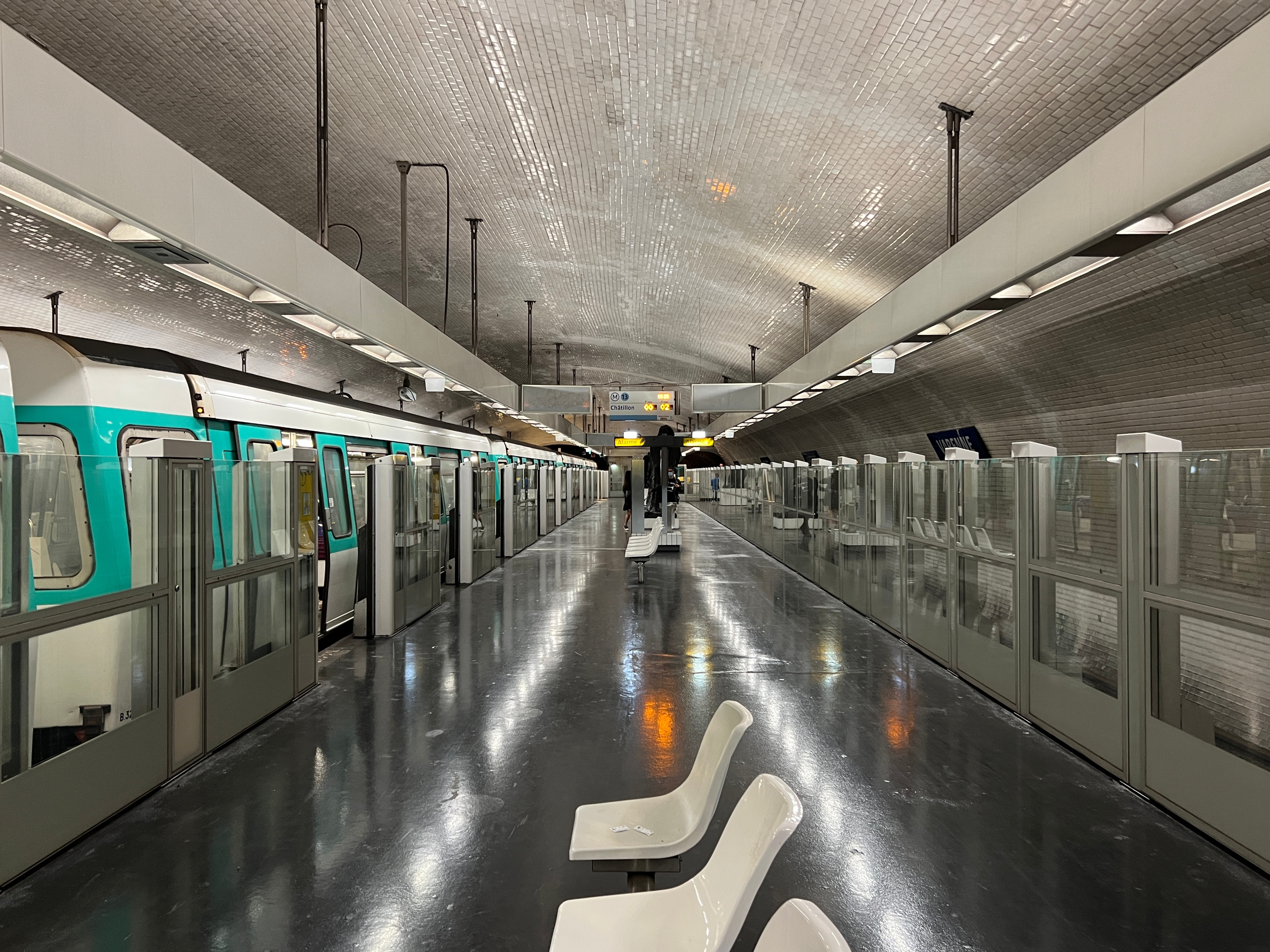
- Station view

General information
- Location: 7th arrondissement of Paris; Île-de-France; France
- Coordinates: 48°51′22″N 2°18′54″E
- System: Paris Métro station
- Owner: RATP
- Operator: RATP
- Line: Paris Metro Paris Metro Line 13
- Platforms: 2
- Tracks: 3

Construction
- Accessible: no

Other information
- Fare zone: 1

History
- Opened: 30 December 1923

Services
Preceding station	Paris Metro	Following station
Saint-François-Xavier towards Châtillon–Montrouge	Line 13	Invalides towards Les Courtilles or Saint-Denis–Université
Location
- Location within Paris

Varenne (French pronunciation: [vaʁɛn]) is a station on Line 13 of the Paris Métro. Located in the 7th arrondissement, it is named after the nearby Rue de Varenne.

== History ==
The station opened on 20 December 1923 as part of the original section of Line 10 between Invalides and Croix-Rouge (a station east of Sèvres-Babylone, which was closed during World War II). On 27 July 1937 the section of Line 10 between Invalides and Duroc was transferred to become the first section of the old Line 14, which was connected under the Seine and incorporated into Line 13 on 9 November 1976.

The Rue de Varenne runs east from the station. It has been closely associated with the Government of France, since the President of the Council of Ministers (equivalent to Prime Minister under the Third and Fourth Republics) settled in the nearby Hôtel Matignon in January 1935. Other ministries are also located in the private mansions of the district. During World War II, the station was closed because the government was in Vichy and the private mansions, which had housed ministries, were deserted..It reopened in 1962. Since the establishment of the Fifth Republic in 1958, the Hôtel Matignon has been the official residence of the Prime Minister of France.

== Passenger services ==
=== Access ===
The station has a single entrance, at no. 13 Boulevard des Invalides.

=== Station layout ===
G	Street Level	Exit/Entrance
M	Mezzanine	Fare control, station agent
P Platforms	Side platform, doors will open on the right
P Platforms	Northbound	← toward Les Courtilles or Saint-Denis–Université (Invalides)
P Platforms	Southbound	toward Châtillon–Montrouge (Saint François-Xavier) →
P Platforms	Island platform, doors will open on the left, right
P Platforms	Southbound	toward Châtillon–Montrouge (Saint François-Xavier) →

=== Platforms ===
The vault is elliptical and covered with the classic beveled white tiles. The platforms are laid out in the Andreu-Motte style but with neutral tones. The three light canopies (one for each track) are treated in light grey while the bench on which the seats of the platform to Saint-Denis and Asnières - Gennevilliers rest is adorned with flat white tiles. The seats are of the Motte type, also white. The name of the station has the particularity of being present in three forms: on enamelled plaques in Parisine font on the Châtillon platform and in capital letters on the wall of the connecting track (which has no advertising) and in earthenware for the platforms Saint-Denis and Asnières-Gennevilliers. On this same platform, the advertising frames are made of a honey-coloured ceramic. The platform for Châtillon-Montrouge is decorated with two reproductions of sculptures by Auguste Rodin, The Thinker and Monument to Balzac.

Since 2012, the platforms have been equipped with platform screen doors, although the façade modules along the unused track have no doors.

== Nearby ==
Sites of interest nearby include:

- Les Invalides
- The Musée Rodin, a museum to Auguste Rodin
- The Hôtel de Matignon, the official residence of the Prime Minister of France
- The Hôtel de Besenval, both the seat of the Swiss Embassy, Paris and official residence of the Swiss ambassador

== Gallery ==
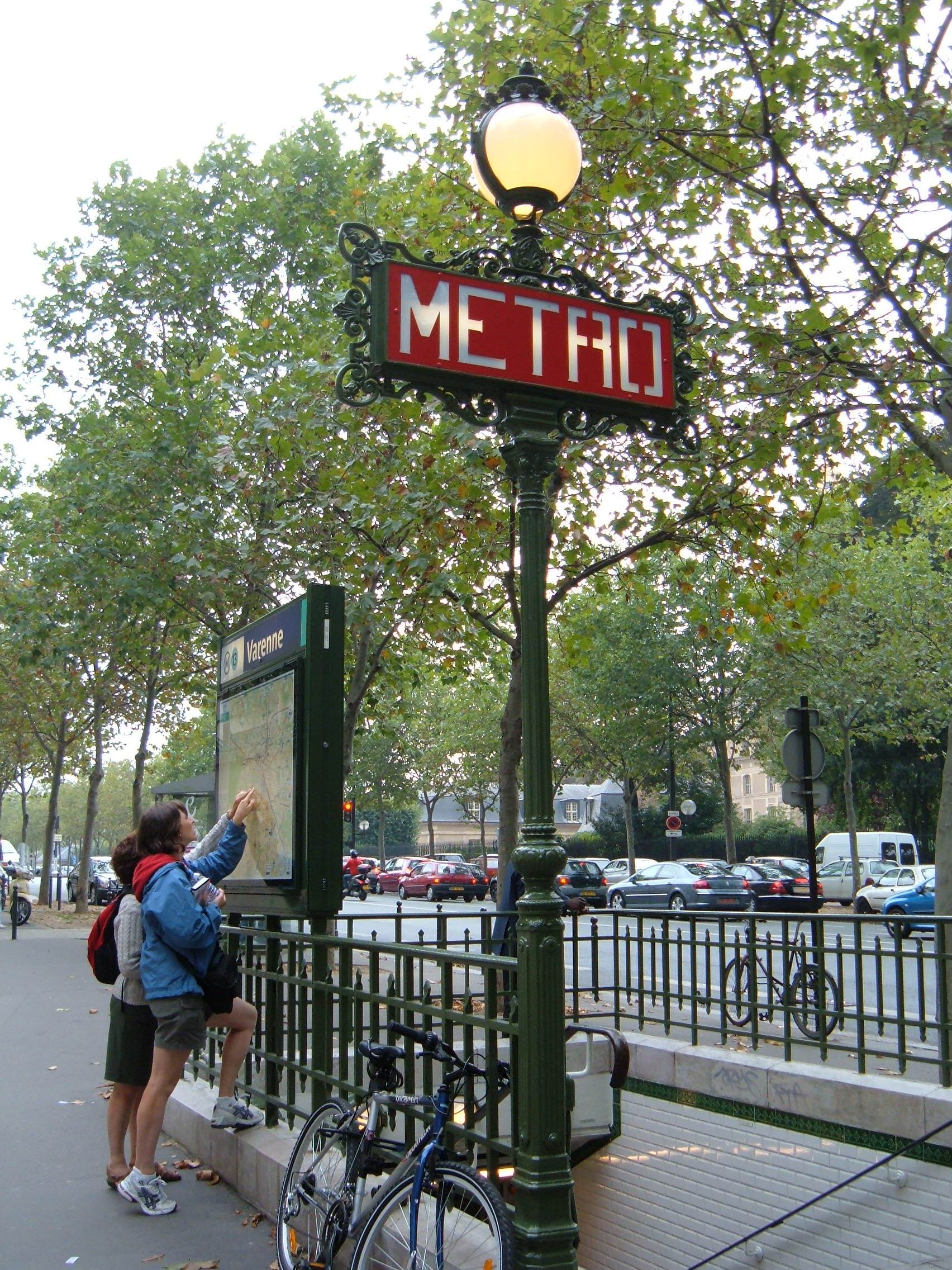
Street-level entrance at Varenne

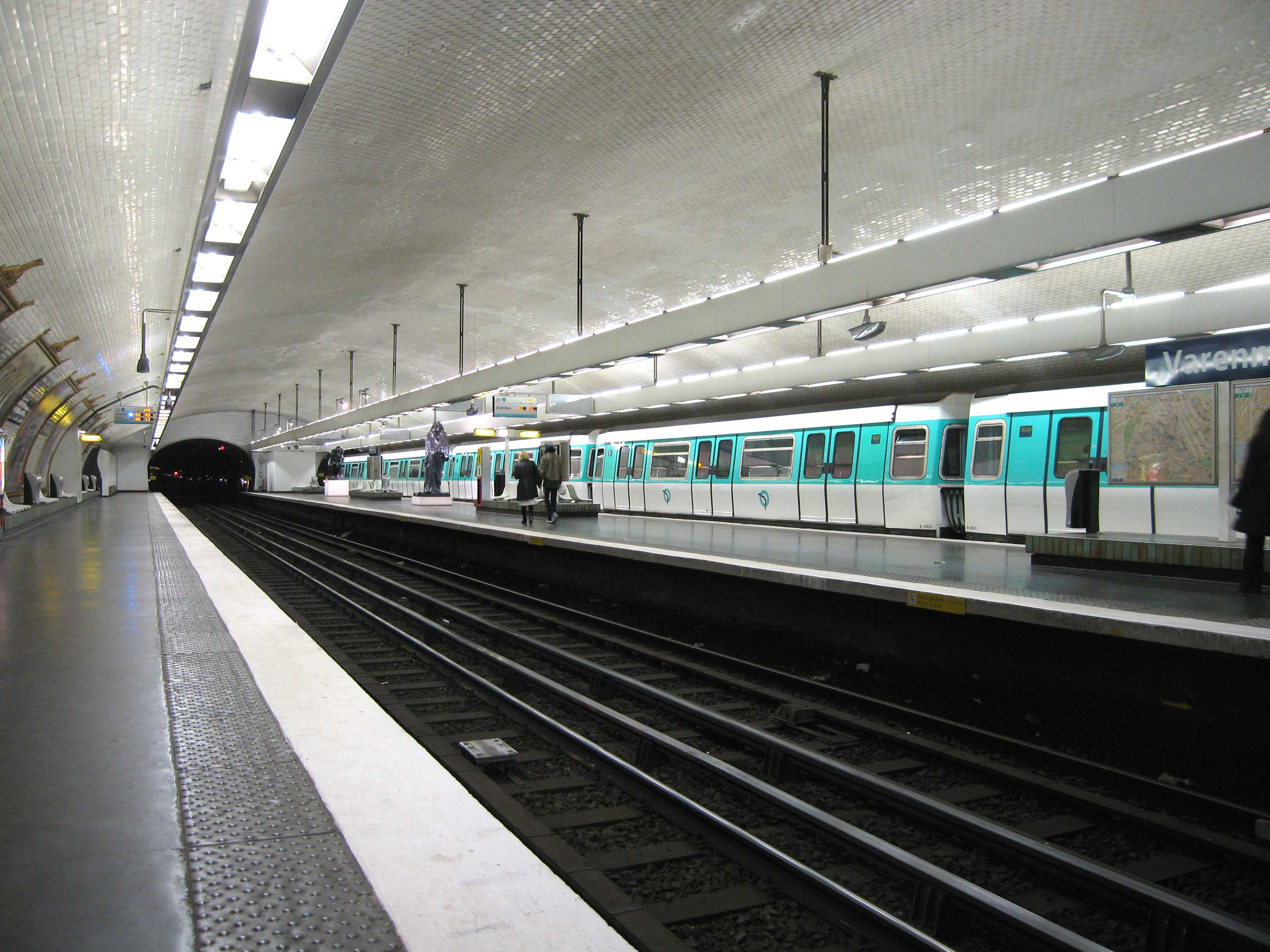
MF 77 rolling stock on Line 13 at Varenne
