= Invalides station =

Paris Métro and RER station

Invalides
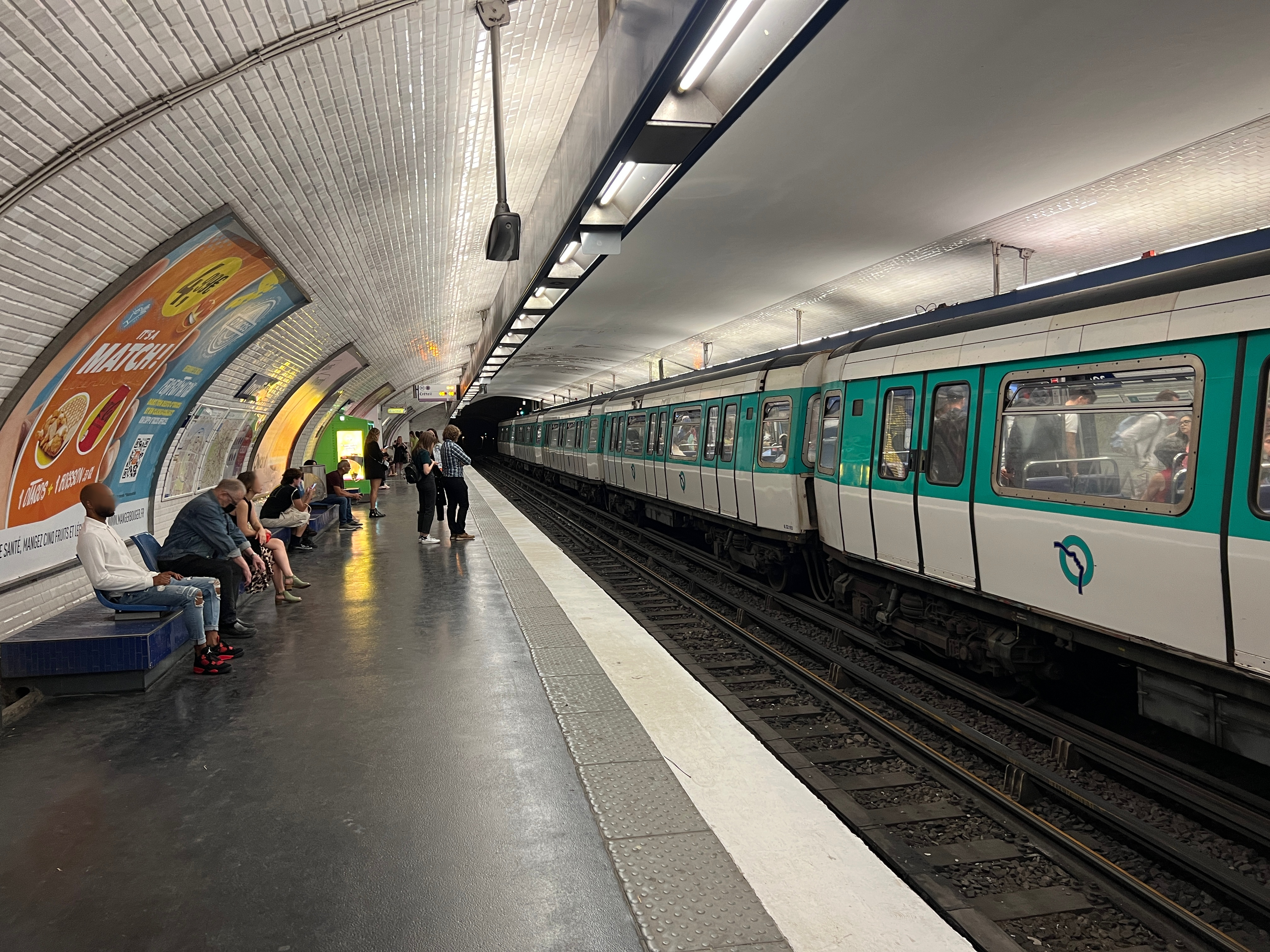
- Invalides station Métro Line 8 platforms

General information
- Location: 7th arrondissement of Paris; France
- Coordinates: 48°51′47″N 2°18′48″E
- Operator: Métro: RATP Group; RER: SNCF
- Platforms: Métro Line 8: 2 side platforms; Métro Line 13: 1 island platform, 1 side platform; RER: 2 island platforms
- Tracks: Métro Line 8: 2; Métro Line 13: 3; RER: 4
- Connections: RATP Bus: 28 63 69 83 87 93; Tootbus Paris; Noctilien: N01 N02

Construction
- Structure type: Underground
- Accessible: No

Other information
- Station code: Métro: 1099; RER: 87393033
- Fare zone: 1

History
- Opened: 13 July 1913

Passengers
- 2024: 10,764,177

Services
Preceding station	Paris Metro	Following station
La Tour-Maubourg towards Balard	Line 8	Concorde towards Pointe du Lac
Varenne towards Châtillon–Montrouge	Line 13	Champs-Élysées–Clemenceau towards Les Courtilles or Saint-Denis–Université
Preceding station	RER	Following station
Pont de l'Alma towards Pontoise, Versailles Château Rive Gauche or Saint-Quentin-en-Yvelines	RER C	Musée d'Orsay towards Massy-Palaiseau, Dourdan-la-Forêt or Saint-Martin-d'Étampes
Location

Invalides (French pronunciation: [ɛ̃valid]) is a metro station on Lines 8 and 13 of the Paris Métro and a railway station on RER C in the 7th arrondissement. It is situated near and named after Les Invalides, although La Tour-Maubourg (Line 8) and Varenne (Line 13) are closer to the building.

== History ==
The Métro station was opened on 13 July 1913 as part of the original section of Line 8 between Beaugrenelle (now Charles Michels on Line 10) and Opéra. The Line 13 platforms were opened on 20 December 1923 as part of the original section of Line 10 between Invalides and Croix-Rouge (a station east of Sèvres–Babylone, which was closed during World War II). On 27 July 1937 the section of Line 10 between Invalides and Duroc was transferred to become the first section of the old Line 14, which was connected under the Seine and incorporated into Line 13 on 9 November 1976.

A number of institutions are seated nearby, including in the Palais Bourbon, seat of the National Assembly (the lower house of the French Parliament), also served by Assemblée Nationale on Line 12, as well as in the Hôtel du ministre des Affaires étrangères, seat of the Ministry for Europe and Foreign Affairs.

== Passenger services ==
=== Access ===
The station has a single access to the eastern part of the Esplanade des Invalides near the intersection of Rue de Constantine and Rue de l'Université.

=== Station layout ===
==== Métro ====
G	Street Level	Exit/Entrance
B1	Mezzanine	Fare control, station agent
B2	Side platform, doors will open on the right
B2	Northbound	← toward Les Courtilles or Saint-Denis–Université (Champs-Élysées–Clemenceau)
B2	Southbound	toward Châtillon–Montrouge (Varenne) →
B2	Island platform, doors will open on the left, right
B2	Southbound	toward Châtillon–Montrouge (Varenne) →
B3
B3	Side platform, doors will open on the right
B3	Westbound	← toward Balard (La Tour-Maubourg)
B3	Eastbound	toward Créteil–Pointe du Lac (Concorde) →
B3	Side platform, doors will open on the right

==== RER ====
G	Street Level	Exit/Entrance
B1	Mezzanine	Tickets
B2	Track 3	→
B2	Island platform
B2	Track 1	→
B2	Track 2	←
B2	Island platform
B2	Track 4	←

=== Platforms ===
The station on line 8 is of standard configuration. It has two platforms separated by the metro tracks and the vault is elliptical. Line 8 is the most easterly, parallel and slightly lower than line 13. The connections and looped sidings are located to the west of it.

On line 13, the layout of the platforms is in the form of two half-stations. In the direction of Châtillon-Montrouge, a central platform is flanked by two tracks, one of which is used as a garage; in the direction of Asnières-Gennevilliers or Saint-Denis, a single platform is served by a track. These two half-stations are decorated in the Andreu-Motte style.

Part of the platform in the direction of Balard is not accessible to the public ("dead platform"). This half-station, which has remained closed since its construction between 1913 and 1922, is the remnant of a circular line that was never built.

=== Bus connections ===
The station is served by lines 63, 83, 87 and 93, mode line C of the RATP Bus Network and, at night, by lines N01 and N02 of the Noctilien network.

== RER station ==
The RER station was opened on 31 May 1902 by the Chemins de fer de l'Ouest. It was originally a terminus but was extended to Gare d'Orsay and the line converted to RER C in 1979.

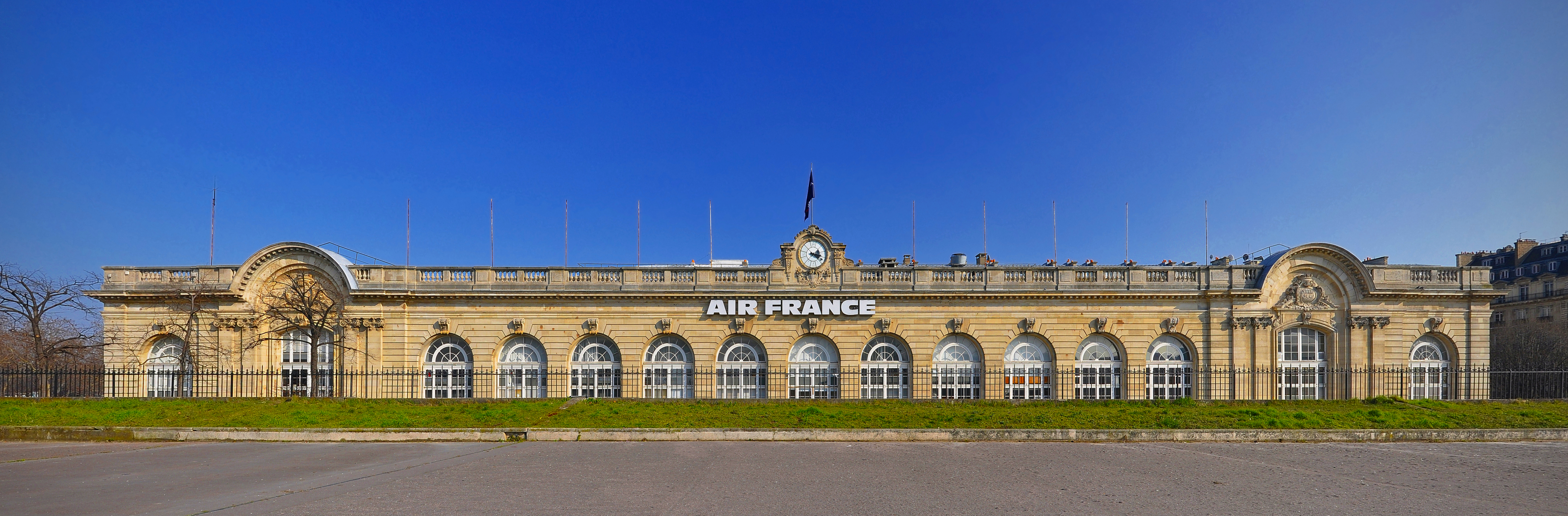
Gare des Invalides

== Gallery ==
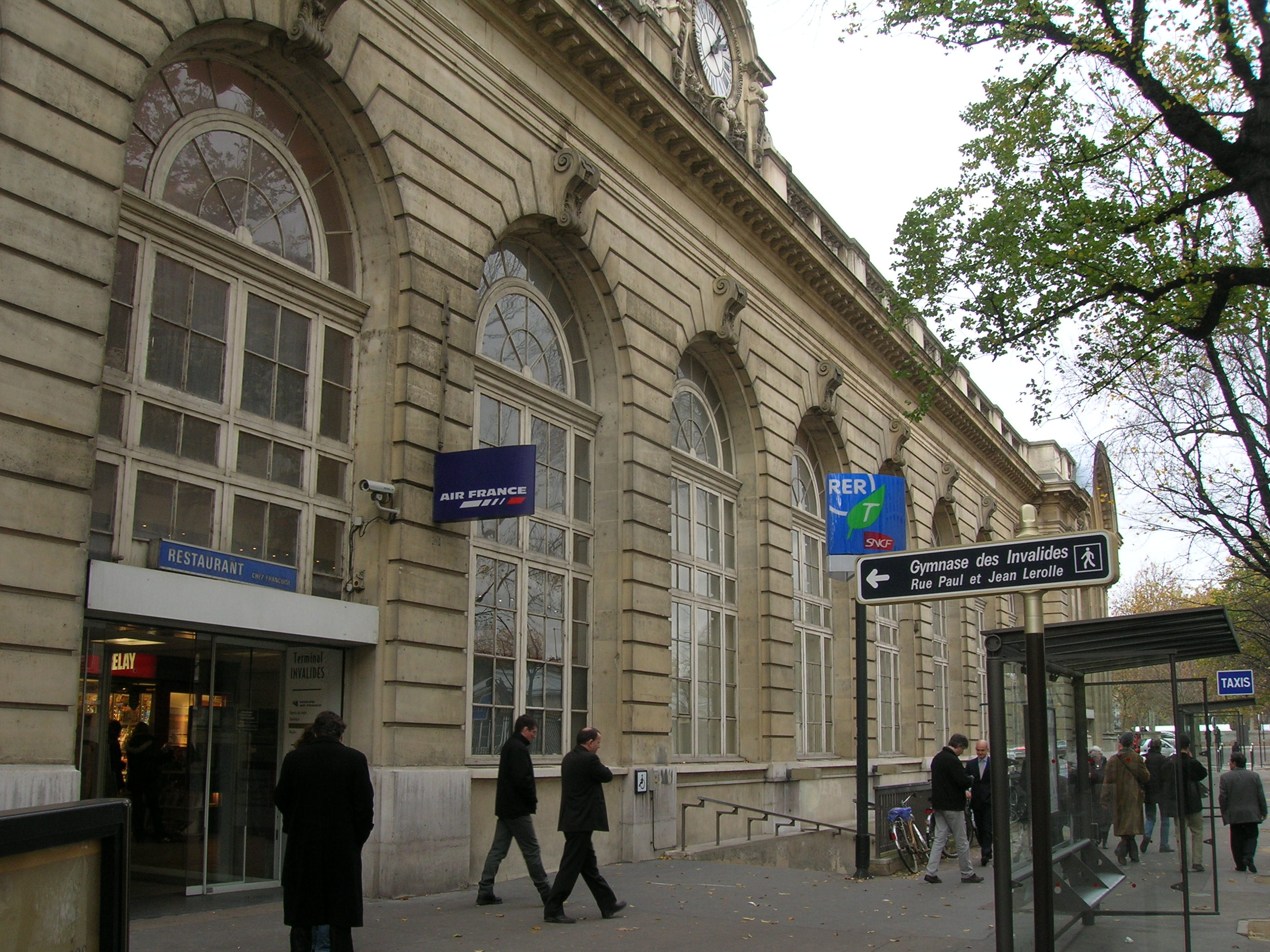
Street-level entrance at Invalides

=== Métro ===
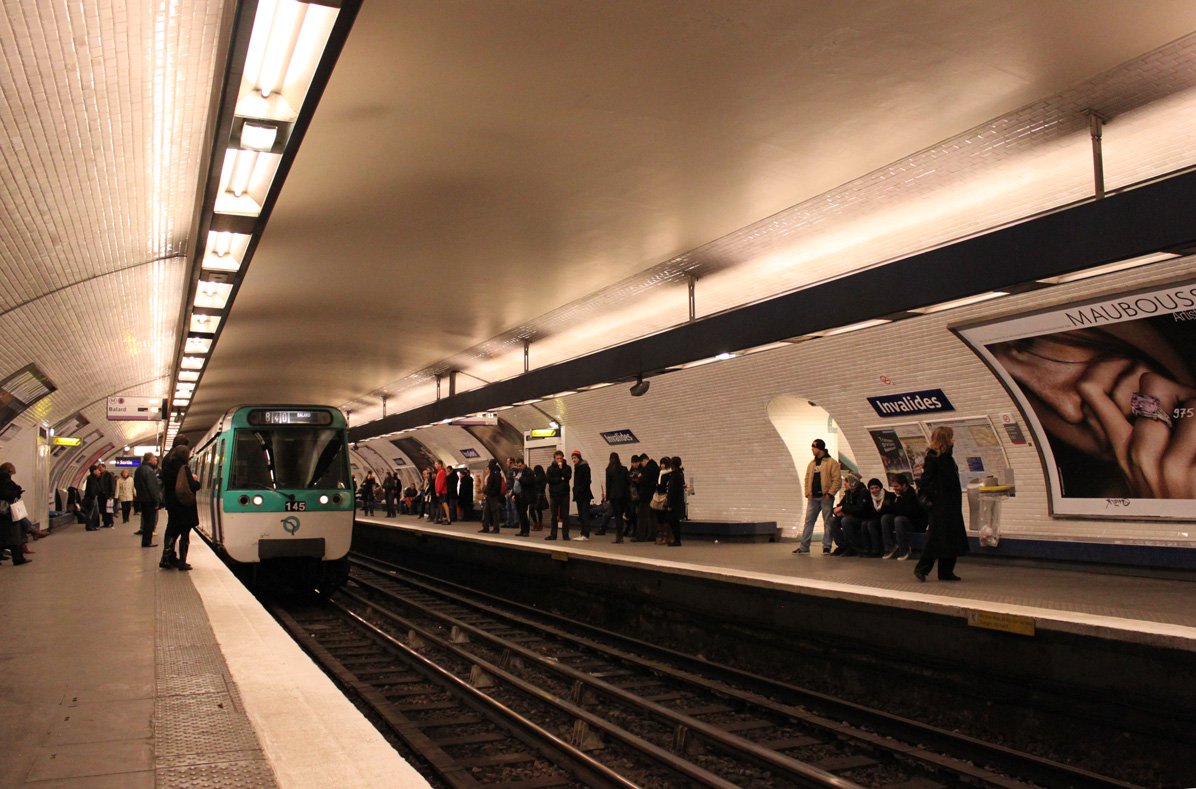
MF 77 rolling stock on Line 8 at Invalides

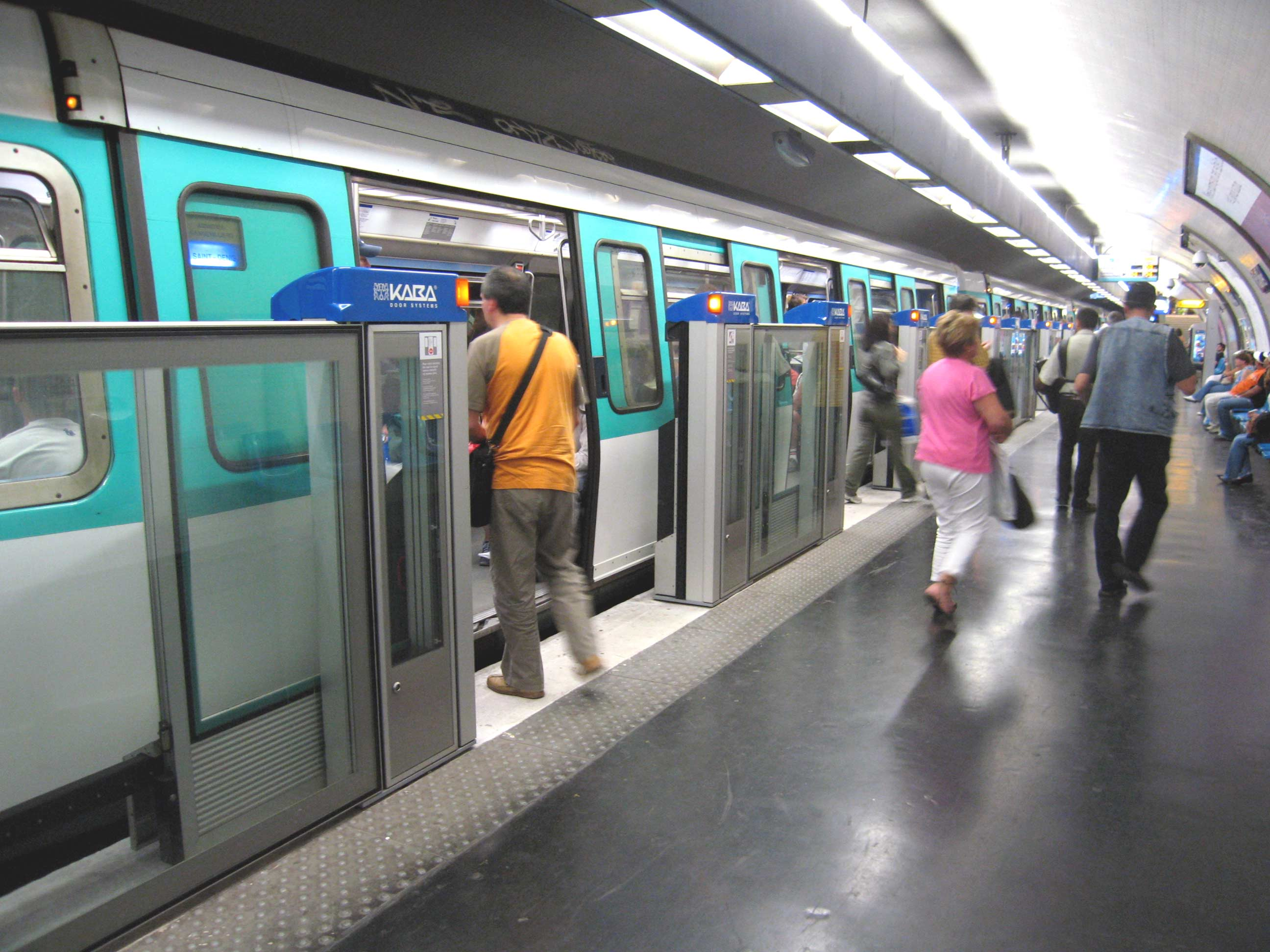
Line 13 platforms at Invalides with automatic platform gates

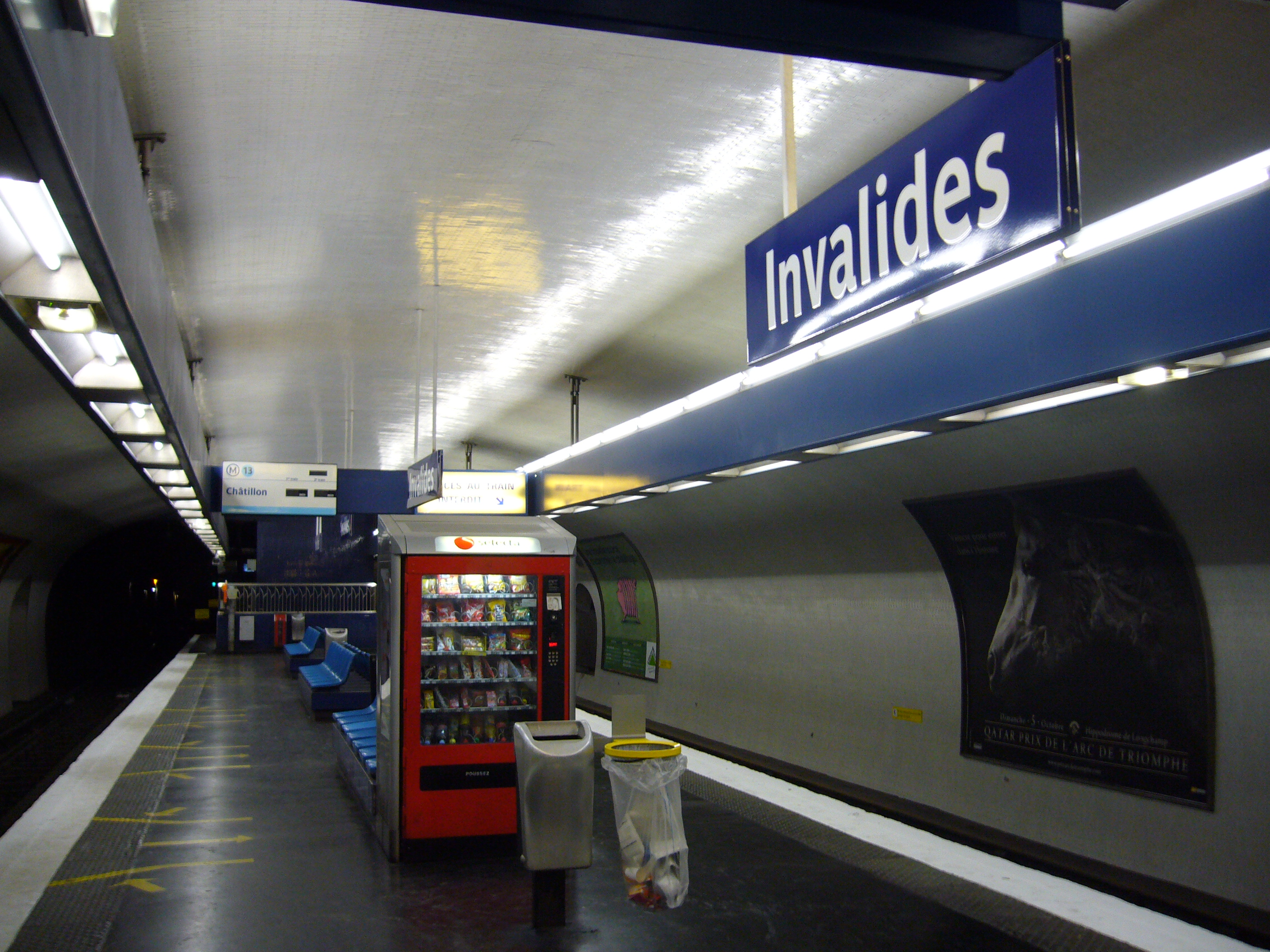
Line 13 platforms prior to installation of automatic platform gates

=== RER ===
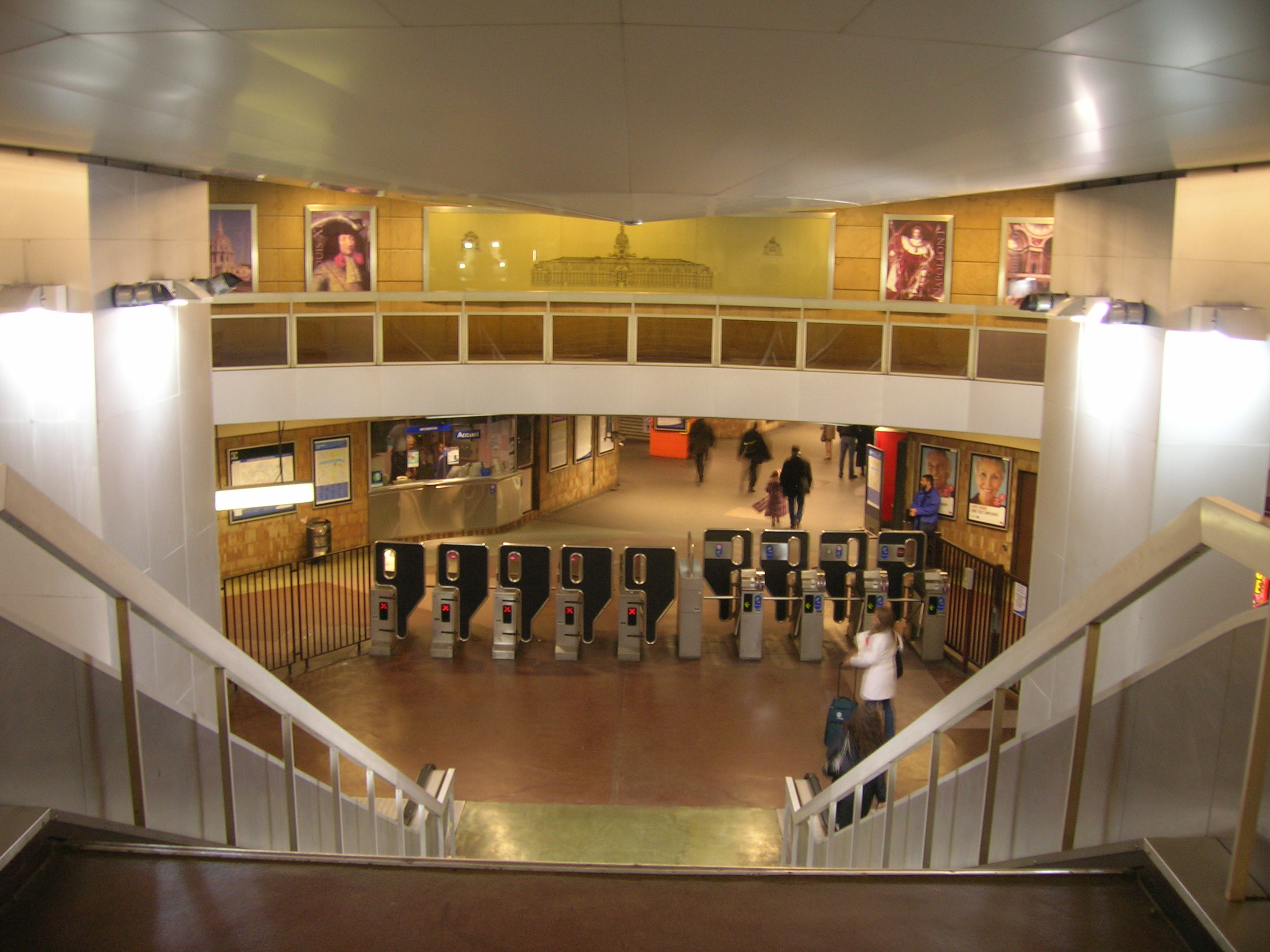
Invalides RER ticket hall

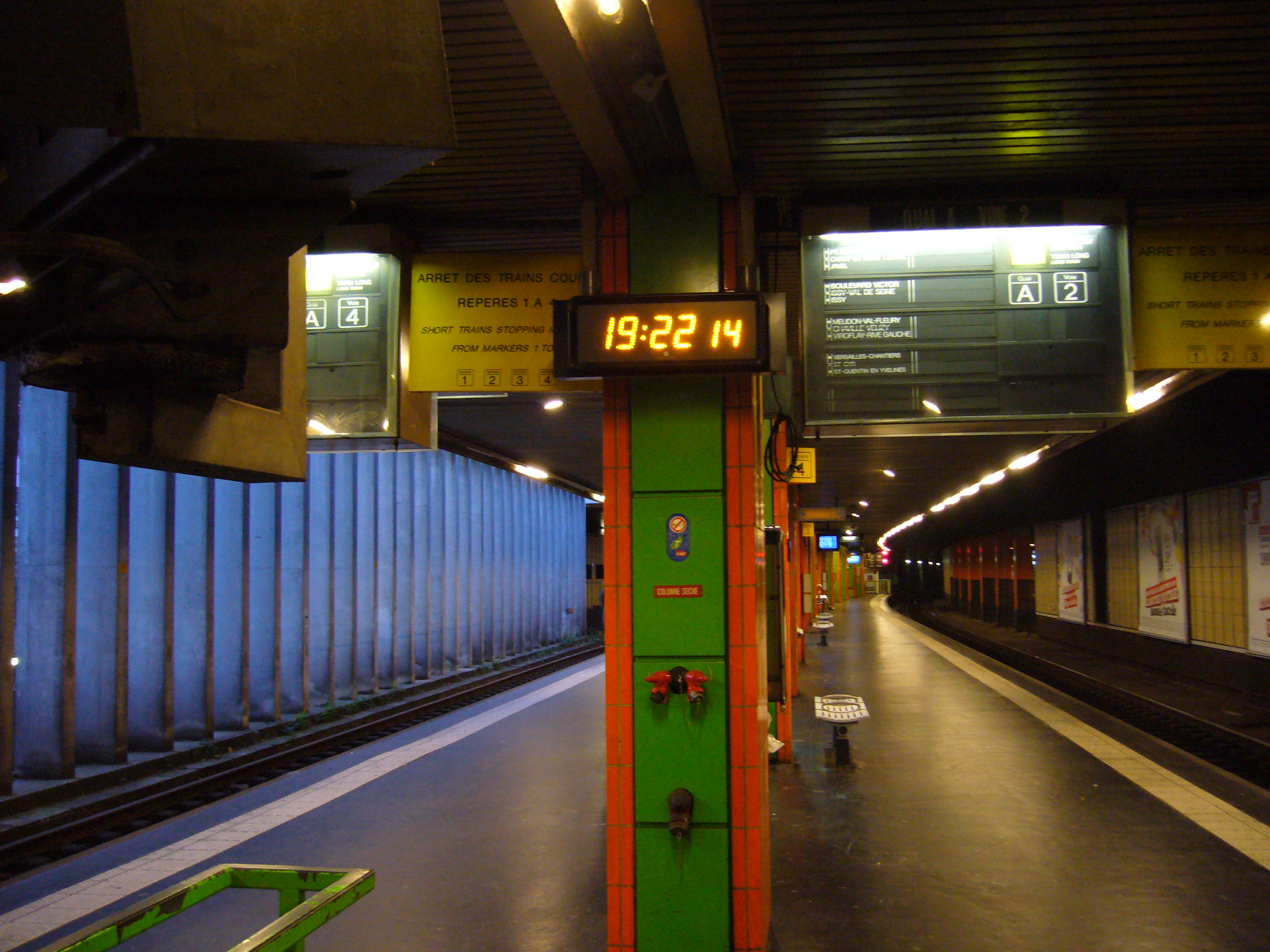
RER C platforms at Invalides

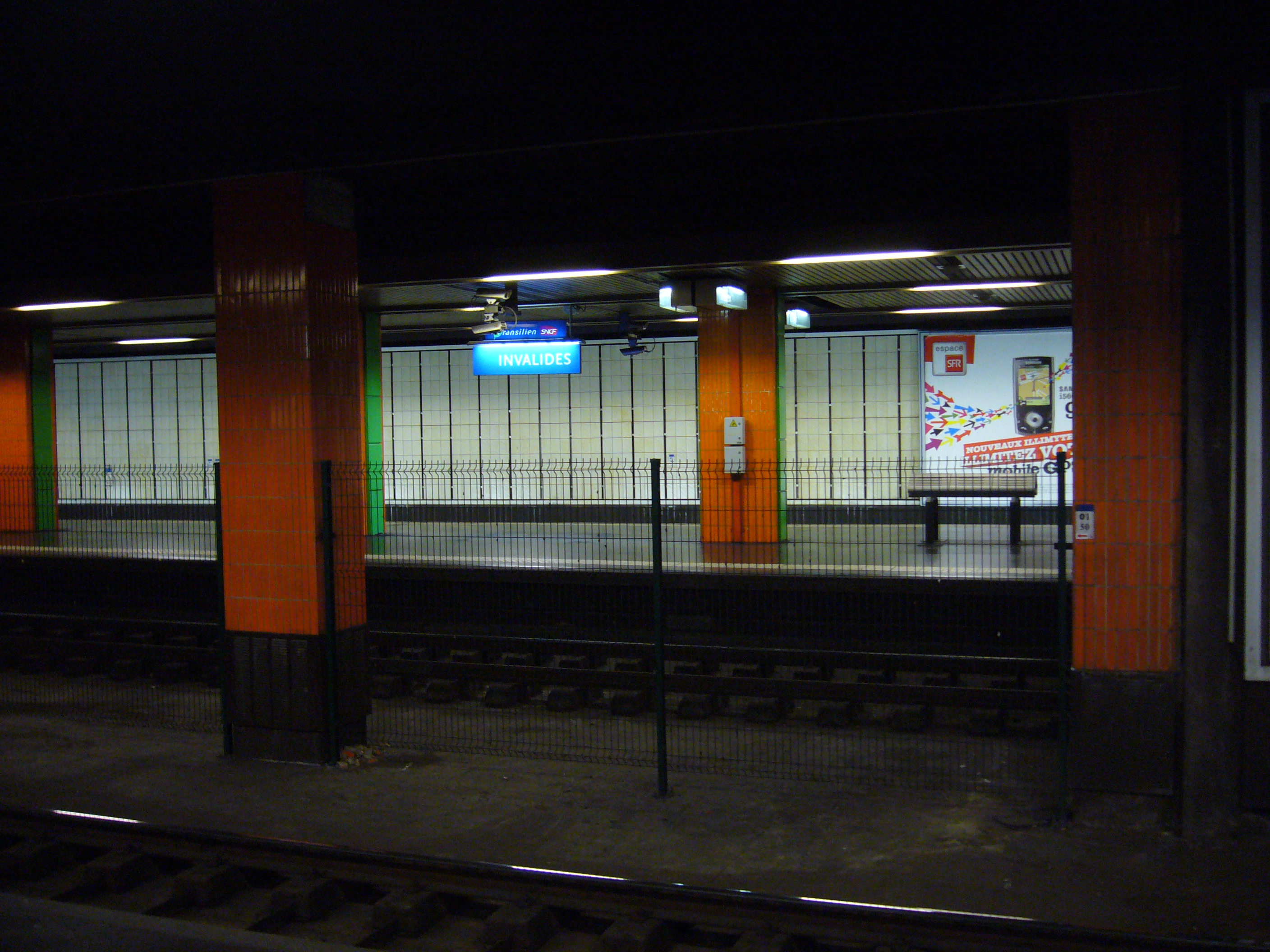
RER C platforms at Invalides

== Nearby ==
- The Hôtel des Invalides (Les Invalides) and Cathedral of Saint-Louis-des-Invalides (also served more closely by La Tour-Maubourg and Varenne stations)
- The Palais Bourbon (also served by Assemblée Nationale station), seat of the National Assembly
- The Hôtel de Lassay, official residence of the President of the National Assembly
- The University of London Institute in Paris
- The Hôtel du ministre des Affaires étrangères, seat of the Foreign Ministry
- The American Church in Paris (also served by Pont de l'Alma station)
- The Hôtel de Monaco, official residence of the Polish ambassador to France
- The Maison de la Chimie, a conference centre

== See also ==
- List of stations of the Paris Métro
- List of stations of the Paris RER
