= The Complete Stories of J. G. Ballard =

2009 short story collection

- Cover of the first edition
- Language: English
- Genre: Anthology
- Publisher: W. W. Norton & Company
- Publication date: September 21, 2009
- Publication place: United States
- Media type: Print (hardcover)
- Pages: 1216 pp
- ISBN: 978-0-393-07262-4
- OCLC: 317919480

The Complete Stories of J. G. Ballard is a collection of short stories by J. G. Ballard, published in 2009 by W. W. Norton & Company.

It contains all short stories appeared in the anthology The Complete Short Stories of J. G. Ballard: Volume 1 & Volume 2 (2006), adding 3 stories: The Ultimate City, The Secret Autobiography of J.G.B. and The Dying Fall.
