= Super-Cannes =

2000 novel by J. G. Ballard

First edition (publ. Flamingo, UK)

Super-Cannes is a novel by the British author J. G. Ballard, published in 2000. It picks up on the same themes as his earlier Cocaine Nights, and has often been called a companion piece to that book. This is the third time that the author has used the concept of a closed society, a privileged community completely shut off from the outside world, as the theme for one of his novels, after High-Rise and Running Wild (novella).

== Plot summary ==
In the hills above Cannes, a European elite has gathered in the business-park Eden-Olympia, a closed society that offers its privileged residents luxury homes, private doctors, private security forces, their own psychiatrists, and other conveniences required by the modern businessman. The book's protagonist, Paul, quits his job as an editor and moves to Eden-Olympia with his wife Jane when she is offered a job there as a pediatrician. At first glance, Eden-Olympia seems the ideal workers' paradise, but beneath its glittering, glass-wall surface, all is not well. For if things are running smoothly, then why are all the residents – these well-established businessmen, doctors, architects, and producers – all suffering heavily from stress and insomnia? And why did Jane's predecessor, the well-liked and apparently quite sane David Greenwood, go to work one day with an assault rifle strapped over his shoulders, murdering several of his friends and co-workers, before he put the rifle to his own head?

Quickly bored with life in Eden-Olympia ("the kind of adolescent society where you define yourself by the kind of trainers you wear"), Paul decides to investigate the events that led to Greenwood's death, and begins walking in his footsteps. He soon discovers that just beneath the calm, well-mannered surface of his new home lies an underworld of crime, deviant sex, and drugs that seems to be prospering and growing. And all the residents at Eden-Olympia seem not only to be aware of this, but to encourage and welcome this underworld, as it provides them with a means to relate to something other than their jobs, and – by entering that world – to let go of the social restraints and etiquette that define their lives.

Paul discovers that Eden-Olympia's resident psychiatrist, Wilder Penrose, is eagerly encouraging his patients (and there are many of them) to indulge themselves in activities involving sex and violence, as a (successful) cure for their symptoms of stress. Says Penrose: "Psychopathy is its own most potent cure, and always has been. At times, it grasps entire nations in its grip and sends them through vast therapeutic spasms. No drug in the world is that powerful."

== Television adaptation ==
In May 2021, it was announced that Canadian filmmaker Brandon Cronenberg would write and direct an adaptation as a limited series for television.
