= Miracles of Life =

2008 book by J.G. Ballard

- First edition
- Author: J. G. Ballard
- Language: English
- Genre: Autobiography
- Publisher: Fourth Estate
- Publication date: 2008
- Publication place: United Kingdom
- Media type: Print (hardback)
- Pages: 278 pp
- ISBN: 978-0-00-727072-9
- OCLC: 175283644
- Dewey Decimal: 823/.914 B 22
- LC Class: PR6052.A46 Z46 2008
- Preceded by: Kingdom Come

Miracles of Life: Shanghai to Shepperton is an autobiography written by British writer J. G. Ballard and published in 2008.

== Overview ==
The book describes Ballard's childhood and early teenage years in Shanghai in the 1930s and the early 1940s, when the city is ravaged by the Second Sino-Japanese War in the Battle of Shanghai and World War II. After the happy years spent with his well-to-do family in the Shanghai International Settlement, Ballard experiences the horrors of war and then the deprivations of an internment camp, Lunghua, where he is imprisoned with his parents, his sister, and hundreds of other British, Belgian, Dutch and American nationals.

After being liberated by the Americans in 1945, James "returns" to England with his mother and sister, but the return to a country which he has never known, being born in Shanghai, is made difficult by the dismal atmosphere of post-war Britain and the difficulty of integrating into British society. After beginning medical studies at a prestigious Cambridge college, Ballard suddenly quits the university and enlists in the R.A.F.

The stint with the air force in a Canadian air base will prove to be a wrong move, and Ballard then quits the R.A.F. and returns to Britain. The autobiography subsequently describes his happy marriage, the birth of his children (the "miracles of life" that the title hints at), his wife's sudden and unexpected death, and the ensuing difficulties, which Ballard faces by deciding to raise his children as a single parent.

The book also describes the beginning of his literary career, his friendship with pop artist Eduardo Paolozzi, his experimentation culminating in his destructured novel The Atrocity Exhibition, though less space is devoted to the Sixties and the Seventies than to the 15 years spent in Shanghai. The story of the success of Empire of the Sun and the making of Spielberg's film based on it is told, re-telling in non-novelistic style events already covered in his previous autofiction The Kindness of Women.

The book ends with Ballard's return to Shanghai in 1991, and with a very short and moving epilogue wherein he announces that he is sick with a terminal illness.

Throughout Miracles of Life Ballard compares the events of his life as he remembers them and the more or less inventive way in which he has told them in his previous life narratives Empire of the Sun and The Kindness of Women.

== Importance of the book ==
As soon as the publication of Miracles was announced in 2007, Ballard scholars and experts looked forward to it, expecting it to clarify some aspects of Ballard's life that had been fictionally reworked in his previous books, especially in the partly autobiographical novel Empire of the Sun and in the autofiction The Kindness of Women. Ballard has repeatedly declared that those two books are a mix of real events and fictional elaboration. Since Ballard has interwoven real life experiences (especially the time spent in the Lunghua camp) in many of his works (even the overtly non-realistic ones, such as his science-fiction novels and short stories), many readers were interested in the opportunity to read Ballard's own possibly ultimate version.

The book offers important biographical details about Ballard's crucial period in Shanghai, 1930–1946, but does not cover in detail other parts of his life (e.g. the 1970s and 1980s). However, many elements of Miracles show Ballard's intention to present it as a truthful narrative of his life, such as the pictures of his parents, his wife, his children, and his partner, Claire Walsh. A remarkable difference of this narrative from both Empire and Kindness is the presence of Ballard's parents, who had been edited out from these earlier works. With regard to Empire, Ballard explains:

In my novel the most important break with real events is the absence from Lunghua of my parents... I felt it was closer to the psychological and emotional truth of events to make 'Jim' effectively a war orphan.

Much of the added value of the book is to be found in Ballard's witty and insightful remarks that comment on his experiences, but also tie the facts of his childhood and teenage years to the realities of today's globalised world. Shanghai, the city he was born in and the one he gets back to in his 1991 visit, is envisioned as a prototype of our late-modern or postmodern world.

== Notes ==
=== Criticism ===
- Rossi, Umberto. "Mind is the Battlefield: Reading Ballard's 'Life Trilogy' as War Literature", J. Baxter (ed.), J.G. Ballard, Contemporary Critical Perspectives, London, Continuum, 2008, 66–77.
