= The Complete Short Stories of J. G. Ballard =

The Complete Short Stories of J. G. Ballard is a collection of short stories by J. G. Ballard divided into two volumes:

- The Complete Short Stories of J. G. Ballard: Volume 1
- The Complete Short Stories of J. G. Ballard: Volume 2
