= Extreme Metaphors =

- Author: J. G. Ballard
- Language: English
- Genre: Interviews
- Publisher: Fourth Estate
- Publication date: 2012
- Publication place: United Kingdom
- Media type: Print (hardback)
- Pages: 528
- ISBN: 978-0-00-745485-3
- Preceded by: Miracles of Life

Extreme Metaphors is a collection of interviews with the British writer J. G. Ballard, edited by Simon Sellars and Dan O'Hara, and published in 2012.

== Overview ==
The interviews in the book were given between 1967 and 2008 to interviewers or interlocutors including John Gray, Jon Savage, Will Self and Iain Sinclair.
