= The Venus Hunters =

Short story collection by J. G. Ballard

- Cover of the first edition (1980).
- Author: J. G. Ballard
- Language: English
- Publication date: 1980

The Venus Hunters is a collection of short stories by British writer J. G. Ballard, first published in 1980 as a paperback by Panther Books, and reprinted as a hardback in 1986 by Victor Gollancz. It includes:

- "Now: Zero"
- "The Time-Tombs"
- "Track 12"
- "Passport to Eternity"
- "Escapement"
- "Time of Passage"
- "The Venus Hunters"
- "The Killing Ground"
- "One Afternoon at Utah Beach"
- "The 60 Minute Zoom"

The first seven stories are reprinted from The Overloaded Man; the other three are more recent.
