= Deep End (short story) =

Short story by J. G. Ballard

"Deep End" is a short story written in 1961 by British author J. G. Ballard. It first appeared in the May 1961 edition of New Worlds (Volume 36, Number 106) and then in the 1962 collection The Voices of Time and Other Stories followed by The Complete Short Stories of J. G. Ballard: Volume 1 in 2006. The tale is typical of Ballard's dystopian science fiction.

== Setting ==
In either a near-future or alternate present reality, the Earth lies nearly desolate after extensive overuse of its resources in order to colonise other planets. The oceans had undergone 'oxygen mining' to electrolytically provide oxygen for the atmospheres for the new planets, and in doing so had left only the hydrogen extract from the water, which escaped the Earth and stripped the Earth's hospitable atmosphere to about a mile high, and ensuring the extinction of most life. As a result, the remaining inhabitants that have not emigrated are forced to live on the drained ocean floors, and have become nocturnal so as to avoid the scorching heat and radiation of the Sun during the day. The last orbiting launch pads are falling out of the sky to the salt dunes and corals towers that were once the ocean bed, and after the last have fallen, the Earth is truly abandoned.

== Plot summary ==
The two central characters are Holliday and Granger, who live in a "town" near the Bermuda archipelago. Holliday is twenty-two years old. He decides not to migrate on one of the last voyages to Mars, and instead decides to remain on Earth with Granger, an older man who was once a marine biologist decades ago when there was still some form of sea left on the planet. Holliday comes to terms with the fact that he and Granger may be the only two people left on Earth in ten years time (the remaining others being elderly), but he cannot shake his urge to stay, and watch over what remains of the Earth's life before its inevitable extinction.

One day Holliday and Granger are in a saloon fittingly called the Neptune, when they see the crash of one of the decadent launch pads falling from the sky. They decide to visit the site, a nexus of saline pools and the only remnants of the Atlantic Ocean - now named Lake Atlantic. Whilst inspecting the large wreckage of the launch station, they come across a dogfish struggling in the shallow waters. Granger fails to see any importance in it, but Holliday immediately becomes attached to it, and using his salt-plough builds it a deeper pool to live in comfortably. When Granger asks of his fascination, Holliday explains that the shark is like an image of themselves staying behind and equates the situation with primordial evolution. Holliday vows to look after the shark, and what he considers to be the epitome of remaining life on the planet.

Whilst bringing the shark food the next day, they come across the pool drained and the shark dying after being tormented by young hoodlums before they leave Earth. Granger tries to comfort an enraged and disturbed Holliday and suggests that he stuff the dead fish to keep with him. Holliday reacts angrily to this, replying: “Have it stuffed? Are you crazy? Do you think I want to make a dummy of myself, fill my own head with straw?”.

The story ends with Holliday’s disillusionment with what he considers the true death of the planet.
