= The 4-Dimensional Nightmare =

Book by J.G. Ballard

- First edition
- Author: J. G. Ballard
- Language: English
- Genre: Science fiction
- Publisher: Victor Gollancz Ltd
- Publication date: 1963
- Publication place: United Kingdom
- Media type: Print (hardback)
- Pages: 208 pp

The 4-Dimensional Nightmare, also known as Voices of Time, is a collection of science fiction short stories by British writer J. G. Ballard, published in 1963 by Victor Gollancz.

== Contents ==
- "The Voices of Time"
- "The Sound-Sweep"
- "Prima Belladonna"
- "Studio 5, The Stars"
- "The Garden of Time"
- "The Cage of Sand"
- "The Watch-Towers"
- "Chronopolis"

Some later versions substitute "Prima Belladonna" and "Studio 5, The Stars" with:

- "Thirteen to Centaurus"
- "The Overloaded Man"

== Release ==
The 4-Dimensional Nightmare was first published in the United Kingdom in 1963, through Victor Gollancz Ltd. It was given a United States release in 1965 through Penguin Books and has been reprinted several times, at one point retitled Voices of Time. The collection has been translated into four languages, French, German, Italian, and Portuguese.

== Reception ==
The 4-Dimensional Nightmare was reviewed by Leslie Flood in New Worlds Science Fiction. Locus also reviewed the work, noting that "Although their formal experimentation seems mild in comparison to much later Ballard, these stories seem utterly distinct from any other SF that was being written around this time, at least within the walls of genre publishing."
