= Studio 5, The Stars =

Short story by J. G. Ballard

"Studio 5, The Stars" is a short story by British author J. G. Ballard. First appearing in the February 1961 edition of Science Fantasy (Volume 15, Number 43); it was reprinted in the collection Billennium the following year. It later appeared in The Four-Dimensional Nightmare (1964), Vermilion Sands (1971) and The Complete Short Stories of J. G. Ballard (2006).

The story is characterised by weird technology and a subtle dystopian ambience. Like the other stories in the collection and in other works by Ballard, the inhabitants of Vermilion Sands are disillusioned and anomic; and artistic culture - which has evolved through exotic and baroque media - is at a slump, in what Ballard later described as a "visionary present".
