= Concrete Island =

1974 novel by J. G. Ballard

- Cover of first edition (hardcover)
- Author: J. G. Ballard
- Language: English
- Publisher: Jonathan Cape
- Publication date: 1974
- Publication place: United Kingdom
- Media type: Print (Hardcover & Paperback)
- Pages: 176 pp
- ISBN: 0-224-00970-2
- OCLC: 3207706
- Dewey Decimal: 823/.9/14
- LC Class: PZ4.B1893 Co PR6052.A46

Concrete Island is a novel by British writer J. G. Ballard, first published in 1974.

== Plot introduction ==
A car accident leaves Robert Maitland, a wealthy architect in the midst of concealing his affair with a colleague, stranded in a large area of derelict land created by several intersecting motorways. Though surrounded by motorists and within sight of large buildings, Maitland is unable to escape the median strip and must struggle for survival. Along the way he encounters other inhabitants of the median strip, which he comes to call "The Island", who are a teenaged sex worker who hides out in an abandoned air-raid bunker and an acrobat who became mentally disabled in an accident and now salvages car parts for bizarre shamanic rituals. He learns to survive by scavenging discarded food from littering motorists, and eventually comes to think of the island as his true home. Conflicts ensue with the other inhabitants and before long Maitland is struggling to determine whether he was truly meant to leave the island at all.

The novel heavily references Shakespeare's The Tempest, with its remote island setting, its stranded inhabitants, the belief in sorcery and its Caliban character, the unstable acrobat.

== Adaptations ==
Ballard's papers at the British Library include his screenplay (1972) for Concrete Island (Add MS 88938/3/9).

In an episode titled "The Island" from the animated series CatDog, both characters are stuck in a dilemma identical to the protagonist in Concrete Island.

In 2011, Barcelona-based production company Filmax announced that it was producing a film adaptation of the novel. Scott Kosar was set to adapt Ballard's story, and Brad Anderson was to direct. Actor Christian Bale was announced as the main character. A start date has yet to be announced. Bale, who played the lead in Steven Spielberg's adaptation of Ballard's Empire of the Sun, apparently is no longer attached to the project.

In June 2013, BBC Radio 4 aired an hour-long adaptation by Graham White, directed by Mary Peate, featuring Andrew Scott as Maitland, Georgia Groome as Jane and Ben Crowe as Proctor.

== Reception ==
The novel was translated to Polish and reviewed by Leszek Bugajski for "Fantastyka" (1/83, p. 50-51).
