= Track 12 =

Short story by J. G. Ballard

- Short story by J. G. Ballard
- Country: United Kingdom
- Language: English

Publication
- Published in: New Worlds
- Media type: magazine
- Publication date: April 1958

"Track 12" is a short story by British author J. G. Ballard, it first appeared in the April 1958 edition of New Worlds (volume 24, number 70). It then appeared in Penguin Science Fiction (edited by Brian Aldiss) in 1961, Passport to Eternity, The Venus Hunters, The Overloaded Man, and later in The Complete Short Stories of J. G. Ballard: Volume 1.

As part of an intended anthology film the story was adapted by Harold Pinter. The adaptation was directed by Joseph Losey in 1967 and featured Dirk Bogarde and Julie Christie.

An adaptation of the story was broadcast on BBC Radio 3 in 2016.

== Plot ==
The story begins with Maxted, a run-down athlete, having been invited over to the home of Sheringham, a university professor of biochemistry. Despite Sheringham having asked him over to discuss business, Maxted suspects that Sheringham may be about to confront him about his wife, Susan Sheringham, with whom Maxted has been having an affair.

Throughout the course of the evening, Sheringham continues to play obscure sound recordings to Maxted, making him guess what they are (at one point he plays the amplified recording of a pin dropping). Sheringham explains he thinks microsonics is a great hobby, but it may be developing into an obsession. Maxted becomes impatient with the man he finds repulsive, and awaits the confrontation.

As Sheringham leaves the patio to play the eponymous last track, Maxted begins finishing off his whiskey but begins to feel a peculiar sensation in his abdomen - what feels like ice cold mercury weighing down his stomach. He becomes sluggish and disoriented as track 12 begins to play. Sheringham enters again, smiling. He explains to Maxted that he has been aware of his wife's affair, and has been recording their intimacy for some time with numerous microphones. He explains that Maxted has drunk chromium cyanate, and as Maxted slowly "drowns" internally, Sheringham reveals that the "curiously muffled spongy noise, like elastic waves lapping in a latex seas" appended with thunderous rhythms growing ever louder is an amplified recording of a kiss shared between Maxted and Sheringham's wife.
