= Now: Zero =

Short story by J. G. Ballard

"Now: Zero" is a short story by British author J. G. Ballard, released in 1959 in the December issue of Science Fantasy. It is included in The Complete Short Stories of J. G. Ballard: Volume 1.

== Plot ==
"Now: Zero" is told from the first-person perspective of an office worker at an insurance company. He discovers he can kill people by writing about them, or their deaths. He uses those powers to eliminate anyone he perceives to be an obstacle at his workplace, but the spree of inexplicable deaths eventually becomes too much for the company, which shuts down. At the end of the story, the main plot twist revolves around the main character declaring that the readers of the story should perish as well.

== Reception ==
In his biography of Ballard, Michel Delville wrote that the story "a playful, metafictional piece biting its own tail and ultimately resulting in the death... of the reader, is another successful example of Ballard's use of black humour". Gregory Stephenson listed the story as one of several works of Ballard who focus on the "extremes of egotism" and the resulting self-destructive consequences. Paul March-Russell observed that it is one of Ballard's works that show his "preference for plot acts as a springboard for both play and invention".

John Boston and Damien Broderick describe the story as "about as inconsequential a story as Ballard has published... interesting only as an exercise in narrative voice". Likewise, James Goddard and David Pringle listed the story as one of Ballard's early works "which are too feeble and derivative to find equivalents in his later work".

The premise of the story has been described as similar to the 2003 Japanese manga Death Note, since both works are about a protagonist whose supernatural power is to kill others by writing about them.

== See also ==
- Fourth wall
