= The Kindness of Women =

1991 novel by J.G. Ballard

- Cover of first edition (hardcover)
- Author: J. G. Ballard
- Language: English
- Genre: Semi-autobiographical
- Publisher: HarperCollins
- Publication date: 1991
- Publication place: United Kingdom
- Media type: Print (hardback & paperback)
- Pages: 286 pp
- ISBN: 0-00-223750-4
- OCLC: 24283986
- Preceded by: Empire of the Sun

The Kindness of Women is a 1991 novel by British author J. G. Ballard, a sequel to his 1984 novel Empire of the Sun. The Kindness of Women drew on the author's boyhood in Shanghai during World War II, presenting a lightly fictionalized treatment of Ballard's life from Shanghai through to adulthood in England, culminating with an account of the making of Steven Spielberg's 1987 film Empire of the Sun. A non-fiction account of the same experiences can be found in Ballard's autobiography, Miracles of Life.

It was first published in the UK by HarperCollins and in the U.S. by Farrar, Straus and Giroux.

== Plot introduction ==
The Kindness of Women is semi-autobiographical, and discusses Jim's departure from China, where he had been born and had been interned, to visit England, other parts of Europe and the United States.

Jim is obsessed with two themes throughout the book: sex and death. The numerous sexual encounters are described in clinical and cold terms. The act of sex becomes a dispassionate observation of the male and female genitalia. Too often Jim is unaroused, and has to be "worked on" by his female partner.

When Jim leaves the Japanese camp at the end of the war, he is 15 years old and alone. He witnesses a murder of a Chinese clerk at a railway station, a slow, casual murder, committed by a Japanese soldier in the immediate aftermath of the Atomic bomb. Jim cannot intervene; he knows he, too, could be killed in just as casual a manner. As he walks away towards Shanghai, Jim's life has changed forever.

Jim tries and fails to find a niche in post-war England. Failing to complete his studies as a medical student, he decides to be a pilot. But his motives are strange: convinced that World War III is around the corner, he wants to be one of the bombers, carrying his own "pieces of the sun" to annihilate and, more importantly, to recapture the light he saw at the railway station, where the Chinese clerk died.

He finds happiness in his wife and children but, as a young father and husband in the 1960s, he becomes aware of a certain trend towards violence and the ever-intrusive camera lens. This leads him to believe that the world has become desensitized to the violent images they see on the TV screens day after day: Kennedy's assassination in particular, and the images being screened from Vietnam.

The title refers to women who helped him after the death of his wife, but Jim's view of life is distorted and strange. This makes him ideal material for LSD experiments, but he soon dismisses this. His view of humanity is that of a constant need to view lives and violence, and indeed, sex, through a camera, via TV.

Ballard has declared that the book is the story of his life "seen through the mirror of the fiction prompted by that life". He also said that "Most of the characters in Kindness of Women are complete inventions."

== Sources ==
- Rossi, Umberto. "Mind is the Battlefield: Reading Ballard's 'Life Trilogy' as War Literature", J. Baxter (ed.), J.G. Ballard, Contemporary Critical Perspectives, London, Continuum, 2008, 66-77.
