= Venus Smiles =

Short story by J. G. Ballard

"Venus Smiles" is a short story by British author J. G. Ballard. Originally titled "Mobile", it appeared in the June 1957 edition of Science Fantasy (Volume 8, Number 23). It was then rewritten and appeared in the Vermilion Sands (1971) collection under its new name and later The Complete Short Stories of J. G. Ballard (2006).

Like the rest of the Vermilion Sands collection, this story takes place in the fictional desert town of Vermilion Sands, and also features exotic technology.

== Plot ==
"Venus Smiles" concerns the events surrounding a musical sculpture commissioned to be placed in the centre of Vermilion Sands. On the day of the unveiling, the statue causes outrage with the public—as well as being aesthetically unpleasing, the music emitted from the sculpture tends to lean towards Middle-Eastern style quarter tones and is unpleasing to the ear. Instead of being scrapped, Mr Hamilton, one of the board members who commissioned it, decides to follow the wishes of the woman who sculpted it, and take it back to his home that he shares with his secretary.

At first the narrator, Hamilton, finds the statue looks quite pleasant in his garden, and likes the new melodic classical music it starts to produce. One day, Hamilton and his secretary discover the statue is gently vibrating and moving, and the metal seems to be twisting and turning. As days continue to pass, they find the statue growing increasingly in height and girth, to an extent that is now twice its original size, and the twisting and forming of the new metal is developing at noticeable speed.

After the statue has taken over the garden, the main characters and others begin to strip the metal off, which proves difficult as the rate at which the metal grows is the same as they can dismantle it. Eventually, the sculpture is completely demolished and the metal sold to a scrap yard.

A legal battle then ensues, when the woman who originally sculpted the statue sues the board for damaging her reputation by openly and crudely destroying one of her works. When the ruling is finally made in her favour, ten months have passed. When the lead characters have left the court building they remark on the fact that it is new and yet to be completed—unplastered walls are visible and metal beams protrude from the building. The story ends when the narrator and supporting characters discover the unusual vibrations coming from the beams, and realise with horror that the statue's old metal has been recycled and distributed around Vermilion Sands in new buildings and motor vehicles. Mr Hamilton remarks to his secretary, "Carol, it's only just the beginning. The whole world will be singing."
