= Memories of the Space Age =

1988 collection of science fiction stories by J. G. Ballard

- Dust-jacket illustration, Europe after the Rain, by Max Ernst.
- Author: J. G. Ballard
- Illustrator: Jeffrey K. Potter
- Cover artist: Max Ernst
- Language: English
- Genre: Science fiction
- Publisher: Arkham House
- Publication date: 1988
- Publication place: United States
- Media type: Print (hardback)
- Pages: 216
- ISBN: 0-87054-157-9
- OCLC: 17954351
- Dewey Decimal: 823/.914 19
- LC Class: PR6052.A46 M46 1988

Memories of the Space Age is a collection of science fiction stories by British writer J. G. Ballard. It was released in 1988 by Arkham House. It was published in an edition of 4,903 copies and was the author's first book published by Arkham House. The stories, set at Cape Canaveral, originally appeared in the magazines Ambit, Fantastic Stories, Fantasy and Science Fiction, Interzone, New Worlds and Playboy.

== Contents ==
Memories of the Space Age contains the following stories:

- "The Cage of Sand"
- "A Question of Re-entry"
- "The Dead Astronaut"
- "My Dream of Flying to Wake Island"
- "News from the Sun"
- "Memories of the Space Age"
- "Myths of the Near Future"
- "The Man Who Walked on the Moon"

== Sources ==
- Jaffery, Sheldon (1989). The Arkham House Companion. Mercer Island, WA: Starmont House, Inc. p. 143. ISBN 1-55742-005-X.
- Chalker, Jack L.; Mark Owings (1998). The Science-Fantasy Publishers: A Bibliographic History, 1923-1998. Westminster, MD and Baltimore: Mirage Press, Ltd. p. 57.
- Joshi, S.T. (1999). Sixty Years of Arkham House: A History and Bibliography. Sauk City, WI: Arkham House. p. 158. ISBN 0-87054-176-5.
- Nielsen, Leon (2004). Arkham House Books: A Collector's Guide. Jefferson, NC and London: McFarland & Company, Inc. pp. 134–135. ISBN 0-7864-1785-4.
- Rossi, Umberto, 2009. "A Little Something about Dead Astronauts”, Science-Fiction Studies, #107, 36:1 (March), pp. 101–120.
