= Cocaine Nights =

1996 novel by J. G. Ballard

- First UK edition cover
- Author: J. G. Ballard
- Language: English
- Genre: Science fiction
- Publisher: Flamingo London
- Publication date: 1996
- Publication place: United Kingdom
- Media type: Print (hardback)
- ISBN: 9780002241359

Cocaine Nights is a 1996 novel by J. G. Ballard set in Spain. Like Super-Cannes that followed it, it deals with the idea of dystopian resort communities which maintain their seemingly perfect balance via a number of dark secrets.

== Plot summary ==
The story's protagonist, Charles Prentice, ventures to Estrella de Mar in order to rescue his jailed brother, Frank who has been arrested for instigating an arson attack which killed 5 people. Upon arriving and talking with his sibling, Charles finds to his horror that his brother has confessed to everything, and has no interest in trying to escape his plea. In a matter of days, Charles becomes immersed in the strange world of Estrella de Mar, learning more of its dark secrets, and spending less time worrying about his brother.

Constantly being manipulated while he thinks he is finding the truth, Charles soon finds himself out of control and at the nexus of certain disaster, at which point he finally begins to understand just what happened to his brother.
