= War Fever =

- First edition cover art
- Author: J.G. Ballard
- Cover artist: Peter Maynard
- Language: English
- Genre: Science Fiction, Fantasy
- Published: 1990 Collins (UK)
- Media type: Short Story Collection
- Pages: 176
- OCLC: 9780002237703

War Fever is a collection of short stories by J. G. Ballard, first published in 1990 by Collins. It includes:

- "War Fever"
- "The Secret History of World War 3"
- "Dream Cargoes"
- "The Object of the Attack"
- "Love in a Colder Climate"
- "The Largest Theme Park in the World"
- "Answers to a Questionnaire"
- "The Air Disaster"
- "Report on an Unidentified Space Station"
- "The Man Who Walked on the Moon"
- "The Enormous Space"
- "Memories of the Space Age"
- "Notes Towards a Mental Breakdown"
- "The Index"

These pieces range from naturalistic narrative ("The Air Disaster"), through science fantasy ("Dream Cargoes"), to stories told through footnotes ("Notes Towards a Mental Breakdown"), the index of an unwritten book ("The Index") and answers to unstated questions ("Answers to a Questionnaire"). The stories are connected by common themes which reviewer Patricia Heaney describes as "our isolation in time and the psychological implications of technology".

== Critical reception ==
In reviewing the book for The New York Times, Ursula K. Le Guin stated:

"In some of these stories the deadpan, formal narrative voice works to comic effect, but others are so schematic and intellectualized that their narration becomes mere exposition, telling without showing, a skeleton prose."

Galen Strawson of 'The Independent' had a similarly mixed review,

"He has lost the descriptive encrustations that clogged some of his earlier work. He is not free from clichet or the mournful pluperfects of rapid narrative infill, and many of his sentences are merely serviceable, laying themselves down like sleepers as a story moves quickly forward in pursuit of a single idea. But there are also passages of great tightness and some wonderful images."

Herbert Mitgang, also writing for The New York Times, had a more positive impression:

"To categorize them simply as science fiction or fantasy would diminish their originality as storytelling. Here is an author who keeps extending the limitless boundaries of fiction."

Sybil Steinberg of Publishers Weekly describes the stories as "unsettling" and "brilliant", and comments that "Ballard's is a playful and versatile imagination, and this collection will gratify his admirers."
