= Rushing to Paradise =

1994 novel by J. G. Ballard

- Cover of first edition (hardcover)
- Author: J. G. Ballard
- Language: English
- Genre: Thriller
- Publisher: Flamingo
- Publication date: 1994
- Publication place: United Kingdom
- Media type: Print (Hardcover & Paperback)
- Pages: 239 pp
- ISBN: 0-00-224134-X
- OCLC: 31078296

Rushing to Paradise is a novel by British author J. G. Ballard, first published in 1994.

The novel relates the fictional tale of a small and eccentric group of environmentalists attempting to save the albatross on the Pacific island of St. Esprit from nuclear tests by the French government.

== Plot summary ==
Dr. Barbara is a disgraced doctor who forms a small band of environmentalists to attempt to save the albatross from nuclear testing by the French government on the remote Pacific island of St. Esprit. Neil, a naïve 16-year-old, joins the group and the story is told from his perspective.

During an illegal landing on the island, Neil is caught on film being shot in the foot by a French soldier. The subsequent news coverage makes Neil, and their environmental campaign, media celebrities. This allows a return visit to the island with a larger and more eccentric group of campaigners.

Whilst attempting to land, a French navy frigate collides with their boat. This event is broadcast live to the world by the cameraman who dies in the collision. The subsequent adverse news coverage causes the French to leave the campaigners unmolested on the island.

The coverage also leads to a deluge of gifts from well wishers all over the world, a steady stream of visitors and a growing collection of endangered animals which are meant to use the island as sanctuary.

Visitors include a representative from Club Med who investigates whether the island can be turned into a resort.

These excesses cause Dr. Barbara to manipulate Neil and other residents to commit ever greater acts of sabotage to cut themselves off from the outside world. Gradually, the male residents of the island (except Neil) become ill and slowly die under the 'care' of Dr. Barbara. As fewer able bodied residents are left, the endangered animals they are supposed to be saving are killed and eaten.

Slowly, Neil realises that his role is to father as many children as possible from the female residents. As more visitors arrive on the island, the female members stay and the male members disappear. When another young man arrives on the island, Neil's role as stud is in jeopardy and he too becomes ill whilst the new arrival is kept healthy.

Slowly, over the course of the story, the environmentalists change from being the sane ones in an insane world into total insanity as Dr. Barbara's all female 'paradise' is constructed.

Neil and the remaining residents are rescued in the nick of time by the French navy, after a couple who only just manage to escape alert the authorities to what is really happening on the island.
