= Myths of the Near Future =

1982 short story collection by J. G. Ballard

Myths Of The Near Future
- First edition
- Author: J. G. Ballard
- Illustrator: James Marsh
- Language: English
- Genre: Science fiction
- Publisher: Jonathan Cape
- Publication date: 1982
- Publication place: United Kingdom
- Media type: Print (hardback)
- Pages: 205 pp
- ISBN: 0-586-05888-5
- OCLC: 12526087

Myths of the Near Future is a collection of science fiction short stories by British writer J. G. Ballard, first published in 1982.

== Contents ==
- "Myths of the Near Future"
- "Having a Wonderful Time" - Written in the form of postcards, the story chronicles a young couple who vacation on the Canary Islands, but their flight home is repeatedly cancelled until it becomes apparent that they—along with thousands of other families vacationing—will never return home, and have been forever exiled.
- "A Host of Furious Fancies" - A doctor looks into the curious case of a young girl who became orphaned after her father inexplicably killed himself several years after her mother died. In the care of nuns, the girl shows bizarre behaviors, such as burning childhood books, and obsessively cleaning out the fireplaces afterwards. Despite the fact that she inherited millions from her parents, she treats herself as a servant, allowing herself to become malnourished. It is suspected by the doctor that before his death, the girl's father had engaged in an incestuous relationship with her, and to cope with the trauma she is playing out the fairytale of Cinderella.
- "Zodiac 2000"
- "News from the Sun"
- "Theatre of War"
- "The Dead Time" -"The Dead Time" (1977) is a quasi-autobiographical tale suggested by Ballard's release from a Japanese prison camp at the close of World War II — part of the subject matter which later inspired the novel Empire of the Sun, which, however, features totally different characters and story line.
- "The Smile" - A man buys what he thinks to be a very lifelike and realistic doll named Serena. Over time, he makes new discoveries about Serena, and comes to the conclusion that she is actually a real girl who has been taxidermied. Enchanted by her frozen smile, he falls in love with her and treats her as if she were his wife, slowly falling into paranoia.
- "Motel Architecture" - A man who lives alone begins to suspect that there is someone in his house, convinced that he can hear the intruder breathing. It soon becomes apparent that the intruder is trying to kill him.
- "The Intensive Care Unit" - The story takes place within a society in which everyone is isolated, living alone and communicating (much like webcams) through their TVs. A young family tries to kill each other after they decide to meet in person.

The English band Klaxons named their debut album after the book, and have been quoted as saying they are fans of Ballard's work, reflected in their science fiction and futuristic lyrical content.

== Reception ==
Dave Pringle reviewed Myths of the Near Future for Imagine magazine, and stated that "Ballard has a talent for striking the contemporary nerve. Although made over into SF, the situations in this book are all too real. It is our world he is describing."
