= Vermilion Sands =

1971 collection of short stories by J. G. Ballard

- First edition
- Author: J. G. Ballard
- Cover artist: Richard Powers
- Language: English
- Genre: Science fiction
- Publisher: Berkley Books
- Publication date: 1971
- Publication place: United Kingdom
- Pages: 192
- ISBN: 0-425-01980-2

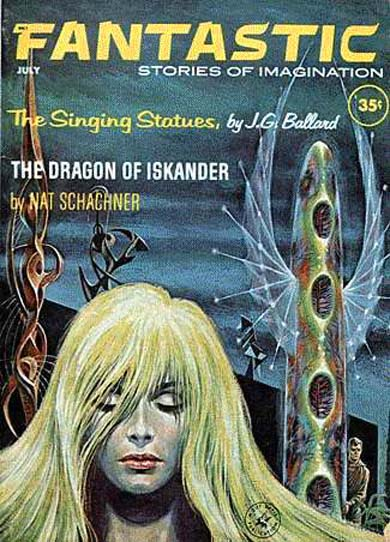
Ballard's Vermilion Sands story "The Singing Statues" was omitted from the first American editions.

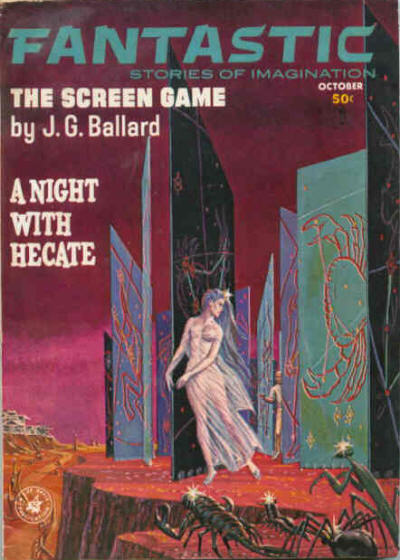
In 1963, another Emshwiller cover illustrated the Vermilion Sands story "The Screen Game".

Vermilion Sands is a collection of science fiction short stories by British writer J. G. Ballard, first published in 1971. All the stories are set in an imaginary vacation resort called Vermilion Sands which suggests, among other places, Palm Springs in southern California. The characters are generally the wealthy and disaffected, or people who make a living off them, as well as parasites of various kinds.

In the preface, Ballard himself wrote: "Vermilion Sands has more than its full share of dreams and illusions, fears and fantasies, but the frame for them is less confining. I like to think, too, that it celebrates the neglected virtues of the glossy, lurid and bizarre."

A Times Literary Supplement review describes the collection's surrealist mood : "J.G. Ballard is … one of the most accomplished creators of evocative landscapes in modern fiction … he achieves this effect partly by painting his desert in the manner of Dali, a mixture of appalling clarity and the exotic."

== The collection ==
=== Stories ===
Vermilion Sands contains the following stories:

- "Prima Belladonna" (1956)
- "The Thousand Dreams of Stellavista" (1962)
- "Cry Hope, Cry Fury!" (1966)
- "Venus Smiles" (1957)
- "Studio 5, The Stars" (1961)
- "The Cloud-Sculptors of Coral D" (1967)
- "Say Goodbye to the Wind" (1970)
- "The Screen Game" (1962)
- "The Singing Statues" (1962) [not included in earlier US editions]

=== Exotic technology ===
Each story concentrates on different media – in some cases more than one – and most of them focus on a particular innovative, usually rather decadent/baroque twist on an existing artistic medium. For instance:

- "Prima Belladonna" focuses on music, especially singing, via singing plants and a 'mutant' voice.
- "The Thousand Dreams of Stellavista" focuses on architecture, via mobile, mood-sensitive houses.
- "Cry Hope, Cry Fury" focuses on painting, through paints that respond to the presence of light/objects (an example of decadence through the evaporation of skill).
- "Venus Smiles" focuses on sculpture, through the creation of a (strangely growing) sound sculpture.
- "Studio 5, The Stars" focuses on poetry, through automated poetry machines (another example of skill vanishing, this time into automation).
- "The Cloud-Sculptors of Coral D" focuses on a peculiar kind of sculpture made by carving clouds - painting also appears in this story.
- "Say Goodbye to the Wind" focuses on fashion via living fashion and sound jewelry (non-aural music and erotic food are also mentioned in passing).
- "The Screen Game" has no unusual technologies, but an unusual aesthetic - jewels and screens dominate.
- "The Singing Statues" returns to sound sculpture (which may have been why it was removed from the American Berkley Medallion edition of 1971).

Although the characters themselves often exhibit the same obsession, anomie and psychological disintegration typical of Ballard's characters, the emphasis on elaborate and sometimes humorously imagined art forms gives these stories a playfulness unusual in his other stories. A few other stories not set in Vermilion Sands are comparable because of their similar artistic games, especially "Sound-Sweep" (1960, on music/opera) and "Passport to Eternity" (1962, full of decadent trends and live fashions).

== Popular culture references ==
- The song "Vermilion Sands" on the Buggles album Adventures In Modern Recording is probably referring to this collection.
- A 1980s Japanese progressive rock band was called "Vermilion Sands". Their album featured a song entitled "The cloud-sculptors of Coral D".
- Vermilion Sands is the name taken by a garage-pop band from Treviso, Italy.
- Brighton, England based electronic band Fujiya & Miyagi makes many references to the visual/conceptual lexicon in Vermilion Sands in their song "Swoon" which appears on their eponymous sixth album.
- In 2014 a temporary installation at the Harmony Arts Festival in West Vancouver was inspired by Vermilion Sands.
- The song "The House" on the Róisín Murphy album Hit Parade refers to this book in the lyrics.
