= The Complete Short Stories of J. G. Ballard: Volume 1 =

2006 collection of stories by J.G. Ballard

The Complete Short Stories of J. G. Ballard: Volume 1 is a short story collection by J. G. Ballard, published in 2006.

The collection is the first installment of the J. G. Ballard's complete collection, followed by The Complete Short Stories of J. G. Ballard: Volume 2.

== Stories ==
This first book of the two-part series contains the following stories:

- "Prima Belladonna"
- "Escapement"
- "The Concentration City"
- "Venus Smiles"
- "Manhole 69"
- "Track 12"
- "The Waiting Grounds"
- "Now: Zero"
- "The Sound-Sweep"
- "Zone of Terror"
- "Chronopolis"
- "The Voices of Time"
- "The Last World of Mr Goddard"
- "Studio 5, The Stars"
- "Deep End"
- "The Overloaded Man"
- "Mr F. is Mr F."
- "Billennium"
- "The Gentle Assassin"
- "The Insane Ones"
- "The Garden of Time"
- "The Thousand Dreams of Stellavista"
- "Thirteen to Centaurus"
- "Passport to Eternity"
- "The Cage of Sand"
- "The Watch-Towers"
- "The Singing Statues"
- "The Man on the 99th Floor"
- "The Subliminal Man"
- "The Reptile Enclosure"
- "A Question of Re-Entry"
- "The Time Tombs"
- "Now Wakes the Sea"
- "The Venus Hunters"
- "End-Game"
- "Minus One"
- "The Sudden Afternoon"
- "The Screen Game"
- "Time of Passage"
