= Passport to Eternity =

- cover of the first edition
- Author: J. G. Ballard
- Cover artist: Richard M. Powers
- Language: English
- Genre: Science fiction
- Publisher: Berkley Books
- Publication date: 1963
- Publication place: United States
- Media type: Print (paperback)
- Pages: 160 pp

Passport to Eternity is a collection of science fiction short stories by British writer J. G. Ballard.

== Contents ==
- "The Man on the 99th Floor"
- "Thirteen to Centaurus"
- "Track 12"
- "The Watch Towers"
- "A Question of Re-Entry"
- "Escapement"
- "The Thousand Dreams of Stellavista"
- "The Cage of Sand"
- "Passport to Eternity"
