= A User's Guide to the Millennium =

First UK edition (publ. HarperCollins)

A User's Guide To The Millennium: Essays And Reviews is a collection of writings by the British author J. G. Ballard. Published in 1996, the book brings together many of Ballard's short pieces for magazines and newspapers, and covers reviews, essays and musing on subject from art, literature and science. The book also contains a selection of autobiographical writings, and celebrations of Ballard favourites, science-fiction cinema and American author William S. Burroughs. There are ninety pieces in all, written between 1962 and 1995.
