= Why I Want to Fuck Ronald Reagan =

Short comedic work by English writer J. G. Ballard

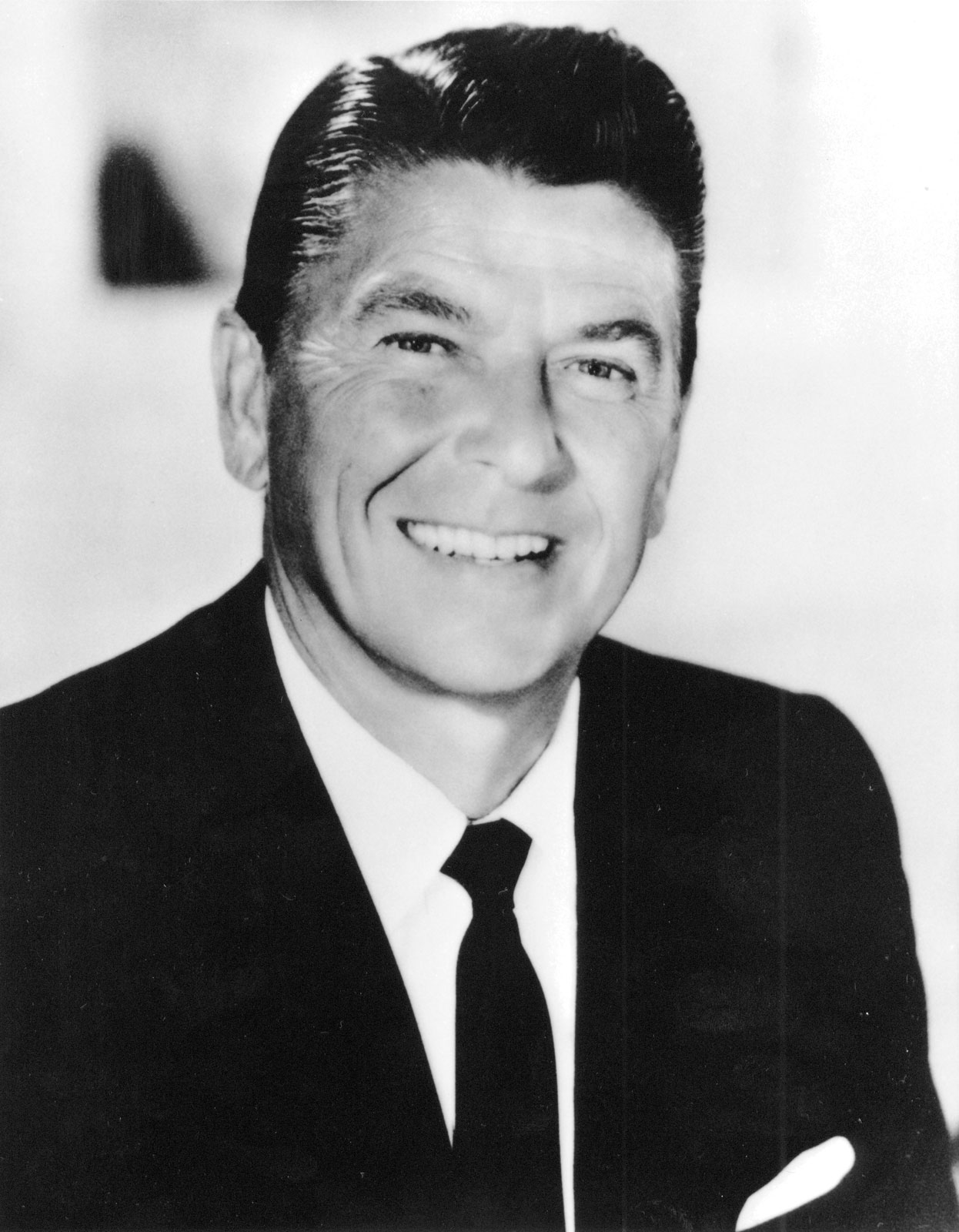
Ronald Reagan in 1967

"Why I Want to Fuck Ronald Reagan" is a 1968 short story by English writer J. G. Ballard. Written in the style of a scientific report, it ostensibly documents a series of experiments intended to measure the psychosexual appeal of Ronald Reagan, then Governor of California and a candidate in the 1968 Republican Party presidential primaries.

First published as a pamphlet in 1968 by the Unicorn Bookshop in Brighton, England, "Why I Want to Fuck Ronald Reagan" was later republished in some editions of Ballard's The Atrocity Exhibition (1970), a collection of linked works of short fiction. It was used as part of a prank at the 1980 Republican National Convention, at which Reagan received the party's nomination for the 1980 United States presidential election.

== History ==
In his preface to the 1990 edition of The Atrocity Exhibition, Ballard wrote that he was impressed and inspired by the phenomenon of "media politicians":

In his commercials Reagan used the smooth, teleprompter-perfect tones of the TV auto-salesman to project a political message that was absolutely the reverse of bland and reassuring. A complete discontinuity existed between Reagan’s manner and body language, on the one hand, and his scarily simplistic right-wing message on the other. Above all, it struck me that Reagan was the first politician to exploit the fact that his TV audience would not be listening too closely, if at all, to what he was saying, and indeed might well assume, from his manner and presentation, that he was saying the exact opposite of the words actually emerging from his mouth.

A bookseller who sold the pamphlet edition of “Why I Want to Fuck Ronald Reagan” was charged with the crime of public obscenity. In 1970, Doubleday included it as an appendix to the first US edition of The Atrocity Exhibition.

At the 1980 Republican National Convention in Detroit, a group of ex-Situationists distributed a copy of the work, the cover of which was decorated with the official seal of the Republican Party, in order to impress and deceive the delegates at the convention. Ballard claimed that the political delegates readily accepted the short-story fiction for what it resembled: a scientific report about the subliminal appeal of Reagan.

== Quotes ==
- Patients were provided with assembly kit photographs of sexual partners during intercourse. In each case Reagan's face was super imposed upon the original partner. Vaginal intercourse with "Reagan" proved uniformly disappointing, producing orgasm in 2% of subjects.
- "Faces were seen as either circumcised (JFK, Khrushchev) or uncircumcised (LBJ, Adenauer). In assembly-kit tests Reagan's face was uniformly perceived as a penile erection. Patients were encouraged to devise the optimum sex-death of Ronald Reagan."

== See also ==
- Crash, a Ballard novel which focuses on similar themes
- Ronald Reagan in music
