= The Unlimited Dream Company =

1979 novel by J. G. Ballard

- Cover of first edition (hardcover)
- Author: J. G. Ballard
- Language: English
- Genre: Surrealism, Postmodernism, Science fiction
- Publisher: Jonathan Cape
- Publication date: 1979
- Publication place: United Kingdom
- Media type: Print (Hardcover & Paperback)
- Pages: 223
- ISBN: 0-09-976941-7

The Unlimited Dream Company is a novel by British writer J. G. Ballard, first published in 1979. It was nominated for the John W. Campbell Memorial Award in 1980. It won the British Science Fiction Association Award in the same year.

== Plot ==
In The Unlimited Dream Company, a man named Blake crashes a stolen aircraft into the River Thames outside the Surrey suburb of Shepperton. Whether he survives the crash, to become a sort of supernatural messiah for the small town, or if he actually drowns, and dying, imagines the whole thing, is never truly revealed. Contradictory hints are scattered throughout the novel which may support both interpretations.

Since the story is told by Blake in the first person, we know what he wants us to know, and we are only told what he chooses to tell us. In the first chapter of the novel, where Blake outlines his life before the air accident, there are elements that may make us suspect that he is insane, so that he is an absolutely unreliable narrator.

Blake has extraordinary powers: he can fly, heal sick people, phagocytize other people whenever he likes; but he cannot leave the suburbs, though he repeatedly tries to get away. Moreover, Blake is obsessed by the relic of the small Cessna aircraft that he crash-landed in, which has been left submerged in the Thames. This might support the hypothesis that he is dead and is only imagining the strange events of the story.

However, there is a crucial moment when Blake, who is about to absorb all the citizens of Shepperton in order to gain energy to escape the suburb, is shot by Stark, another loner who manages a rickety zoo. The wound triggers a deep inner change in the character, who gets rid of his cannibalistic drives and becomes more human and compassionate. He then helps other people to escape Shepperton, and remains there alone, waiting for the return of the woman he loves, Miriam St. Cloud.

As well as the protagonist's name, the novel draws on the works of William Blake, particularly his epic work Milton: A Poem in other ways. The surreal descriptions of Shepperton's transformation are drawn in part from William Blake's psychogeographical descriptions of London, while the final confrontation between Blake and the corpse of the drowned pilot (which he comes to realise is himself) echoes that between Milton and Satan at the end of Milton a Poem.
