= Lunghua Civilian Assembly Centre =

Japanese-operated internment camp in Shanghai

Coordinates: 31.142672°N 121.433365°E

Lunghua Civil Assembly Centre was one of the internment camps established by the Empire of Japan in Shanghai for European and American citizens, who had been resident under Japanese occupation since December 1941. Many had formerly lived in Shanghai within the Shanghai International Settlement before its occupation by the Imperial Japanese Army (IJA).

It was set up on the campus of an existing school which is now called the Shanghai High School.

== Description ==
Lunghua Civil Assembly Centre took over the large campus of the former Chinese Kiansu Middle School on Minghong Road, about two miles (3 km) from Lunghua Aerodrome and about eight miles southwest of the Bund. (Before and during the Second World War, the spellings of Lunghua and Lunghwa were both used; the modern anglicized spelling is Longhua.) The school had been heavily damaged during the Second Sino-Japanese War and its buildings were empty until it was designated as a Civil Assembly Centre in 1943 and 1,988 people were interned there. In Captives of Empire (2007), Greg Leck says

The camp was large, containing seven concrete buildings, three large wooden barracks (originally built as stables by the Japanese), and numerous outbuildings. There were fifty nine dorms and 127 rooms for families. A number of ruins were on the grounds as well. Lunghwa held 1,988 internees during the war and saw a number of escapes, with most of them successful. Nine internees eventually made their way to free China.

The buildings on the site were built orthogonally to each other, on a 42-acre site. The overall site was aligned slightly east of north. Therefore, in the description below, when a building is described as being built east–west it is more accurately described as ENE–WSW, and when a building is described as being built north–south, it is more accurately described as SSW–NNE.

The Assembly Hall was the central building. North of it were the single storey wooden buildings A, B and C. These were built parallel to each other, with each having been built east–west and with Building A as the furthest north. South of the Assembly Hall, also built east–west, was the three storey Building F, which was the administration block. South of Building F was the entrance and southeast was the three storey Building E built north–south. East of the Assembly Hall was the three storey Building D which was an accommodation block for families, built north–south.

West of the Assembly Hall and the wooden buildings were two ruined buildings built north–south and further west of the ruined buildings was the two storey Building G built east–west. Northwest of Building G, in the northwest corner of the site, was the single storey Hospital which was built east–west. The hospital dealt with malaria sufferers. Women who became pregnant were sent to a hospital in Shanghai then moved on to another camp for women and babies. Between Building G and the Hospital were the five Commandant's Staff Residences arranged around a square with three on the northern edge and two on the western edge. Building G was on the southern edge.

North of the wooden buildings were the two single-storey dining rooms (built east–west), and north of each of those was a single-storey kitchen. In the northeast corner of the site, north of Building D, were two parallel, single-storey buildings built north–south. These were Building H, which was used to accommodate single people, and Building I (or J, the documents differ as to the name of this building). North of these were the single-storey shower block (built east–west) and east of the shower block was another single-storey building built north–south, Building J (or K, the documents differ as to the name of this building).

The recreation ground contained a football pitch and was in the area of ground between the Assembly Hall and Building D.

There were persistent issues with water supply and drainage. The presence of malaria and typhoid were also a threat to public health.

Although the camp's commandant was Japanese, the guards were Korean.

The adults in the camp had jobs and a self-elected council. There were also lectures and various social activities, such as parties.

== Lunghua Academy ==
There were some 300 children interned in the Lunghua Civilian Assembly Centre who attended classes at a school on site which was called the Lunghua Academy.

J. G. Ballard (1930–2009), who later became an author, was one of the boys at the school and recalled in 2008 that there was no shortage of teachers for the school, which had a "full-scale syllabus... which met the requirements of the then School Certificate". This included maths, French, English, Latin, history, and general science. As there were few books, teaching was "blackboard-driven". He believed the students did not fall behind those at school in wartime England, and some were well ahead. There were few distractions in the camp, either for teachers or pupils, and he added "We progressed rapidly in the way that long-term convicted prisoners pass one university degree after another."

Many of the classroom windows had been broken by the fighting in 1937, and in winter they let in an icy wind. These had to be patched with pieces of cloth treated with melted candle wax.

In 1981, Peggy Abkhazi, one of the pupils at the school from start to finish, published her Shanghai Journal, 1941–1945, reporting that outside the classroom, football, hockey, and softball, were the sports played, and there were also concerts and dances.

The camp commandant would impose a curfew and close the camp school, sometimes for two or three days, when there was a major breach of the camp's rules, or a defeat of Japanese forces in the Pacific. Parents saw this as a real punishment for them, as they had to take charge of their children.

Headmaster

The school's headmaster was a Methodist missionary called George Osborn, whom Ballard called "an unworldly figure, blinking through his glasses and tireless in his efforts to keep the camp together, and the best kind of practising Christian". After the war, Ballard was sent to Osborn's old school, The Leys. Osborn returned to his Chinese flock at an upcountry mission station, and not to his wife and children, who were in England, but paid them a brief visit a year later. Ballard later got to know Osborn's daughter and found he knew her father better than she did.

== Detainees ==
Among the most notable prisoners was British author J. G. Ballard, who was interned in the camp as an adolescent along with his mother, father and little sister. His experiences there inspired the semi-auto biographical novel Empire of the Sun, which inspired the 1987 motion picture.

Another of the internees in the Lunghwa camp was Peter Wyngarde, later an actor.

== Current site ==
The site of the camp is southwest of the Shanghai Botanical Garden. It is on the corner of Baise Road (百色路) and North Longchuan Road (龙川北路), currently the site of Shanghai High School and its international division. The Botanical Garden is southwest of Longhua Airport; both of these are clearly identified on satellite images. Satellite images show that there are buildings on the site in the "same" location as the Civil Assembly Centre buildings. The site of the camp is now enclosed by housing, but can be identified by the rectangular area (once Buildings A, B and C) and trees. The turning circle in the drive which is south of Building F, can also be seen.

Buildings A, B and C are no longer there, one of the Staff Residences has been demolished and one of the kitchens no longer exists. The ruined building adjacent to the Assembly Hall appears to have been rebuilt the same shape and there are several new buildings built on the site of the other ruined building. There are several new buildings between Building G and the Staff Residences. In addition, there is a road now between Building H and the rest of the site.

G Block was demolished in 2009 to make space for a swimming pool.

There was a small museum about the camp on the site but this was removed in 2012.
