= Running Wild (novella) =

1988 novel by J. G. Ballard

- Cover of first edition (hardcover)
- Author: J. G. Ballard
- Language: English
- Genre: Dystopian fiction
- Publisher: Hutchinson
- Publication date: 1988
- Publication place: United Kingdom
- Media type: Print (Hardcover & Paperback)
- Pages: 72 pp
- ISBN: 0-09-173498-3
- OCLC: 18629186
- Dewey Decimal: 823/.914 20
- LC Class: PR6052.A46 R8 1988

Running Wild is a novella by British writer J. G. Ballard, first published in 1988. The novel takes the form of a detective novel, recounting the investigation of a mysterious massacre in suburbia through the diary of a forensic psychiatrist.

== Plot summary ==
Pangbourne Village is an estate for the upper middle class, protected by security fences and discreet guards. Its ten families are wealthy, respectable, 40-something couples with adolescent children on whom they lavish everything money can buy.

One morning it is discovered that all the adult residents have been killed and the children have disappeared without trace. Dr Richard Greville of Scotland Yard puzzles over the scanty evidence: it gives no leads to the identity of the murderers and kidnappers. No demands for ransom are received. No terrorist group claims responsibility.

The reader soon realizes that the missing children are also the missing murderers. Their controlled upbringing has left them no way to establish their own identities except by rebelling into criminal savagery. However, in a tradition of obtuse policemen going back to Inspector Lestrade in the Sherlock Holmes stories, Greville resists drawing this obvious conclusion - until the children strike again.
