= The Atrocity Exhibition =

1970 collection of stories by J. G. Ballard

- Cover of first edition (hardcover)
- Author: J. G. Ballard
- Language: English
- Genre: Experimental, science fiction
- Publisher: Jonathan Cape
- Publication date: 1970
- Publication place: United Kingdom
- Media type: Print (hardback & paperback)
- Pages: 157 pp
- ISBN: 0-224-61838-5
- OCLC: 161158
- Dewey Decimal: 823/.9/14
- LC Class: PZ4.B1893 at PR6052.A46
- Preceded by: The Crystal World
- Followed by: Crash

The Atrocity Exhibition is an experimental novel of linked stories or "condensed novels" by British writer J. G. Ballard.

The book was originally published in the UK in 1970 by Jonathan Cape. After a 1970 edition by Doubleday & Company had already been printed, Nelson Doubleday Jr. personally cancelled the publication and had the copies destroyed, fearing legal action from some of the celebrities depicted in the book. Thus, the first US edition was published in 1972 by Grove Press under the title Love and Napalm: Export USA. It was made into a film by Jonathan Weiss in 1998.

A revised large format paperback edition, with annotations by the author and illustrations by Phoebe Gloeckner, was issued by RE/Search in 1990.

== Background ==
The Atrocity Exhibition, Ballard admitted in 2007, originated in large part from the sudden death of his first wife Mary from pneumonia:

I was terribly wounded by my wife's death. Leaving me with these very young children, I felt that a crime had been committed by nature against this young woman — and her children — and I was searching desperately for an explanation [...] To some extent The Atrocity Exhibition is an attempt to explain all the terrible violence that I saw around me in the early sixties. It wasn't just the Kennedy assassination [...] I think I was trying to look for a kind of new logic that would explain all these events.

Ballard's short story "The Assassination Weapon" (later to appear as the third chapter of The Atrocity Exhibition) was first published in 1966 in New Worlds and was edited by Ballard's genre fiction colleague and friend Michael Moorcock. As editor of New Worlds, Moorcock aimed to marry the science fiction genre with an avant-garde, speculative tenor. Ballard's experimental stories "delighted" Moorcock: "['The Assassination Weapon'] was exactly what I'd been looking for [...] For me it was exemplary, a flag to wave for authors and readers." Later that same year, New Worlds published the title story-chapter, "The Atrocity Exhibition". Ambit went on to publish "You: Coma: Marilyn Monroe" and "The Assassination of John Fitzgerald Kennedy Considered as a Downhill Motor Race", also in 1966. Ballard became Ambit's prose editor in 1967.

== Content and composition ==
The Atrocity Exhibition is split up into sections, similar to the style of William S. Burroughs, whom Ballard admired; Burroughs also wrote the preface to the book. Though often called a "novel" by critics, such a definition is disputed, because all its parts had an independent life. "Why I Want to Fuck Ronald Reagan," for example, had three prior incarnations: in the International Times, in Ronald Reagan: The Magazine of Poetry, and as a freestanding booklet from Unicorn Bookshop in Brighton, all in 1968. All 15 pieces had been printed and some even reprinted before The Atrocity Exhibition was published.

Each chapter or story is split up into smaller sections, some of them labelled by part of a continuing sentence; Ballard has called these sections "condensed novels". There is no clear beginning or end to the book, and it does not follow any of the conventional novelistic standards: the protagonist changes name with each chapter or story (Talbert, Traven, Travis, Talbot, etc.), just as his role and his visions of the world around him seem to change constantly. (Ballard explains in the 1990 annotated edition that the character's name was inspired by reclusive novelist B. Traven, whose identity is still not known with certainty.)

The stories describe how the mass media landscape inadvertently invades and splinters the private mind of the individual. Suffering from a mental breakdown, the protagonist – a Dr Travis who works at a mental hospital – surrenders to a world of psychosis. Travis tries to make sense of the many public events that dominate his world (the death of Marilyn Monroe, the Space Race, Elizabeth Taylor's much-publicized tracheotomy, and especially the assassination of John F. Kennedy), by restaging them in ways that, to his psychotic mind, gives them a more personal meaning. It is never quite clear how much of the novel "really" takes place, and how much only occurs inside the protagonist's own head. Characters whom he kills return again in later chapters (his wife seems to die several times). He travels with a Marilyn Monroe scorched by radiation burns, and with a bomber-pilot of whom he notes that "the planes of his face did not seem to intersect correctly."

Inner and outer landscapes seem to merge as the ultimate goal of the protagonist is to start World War III, "though not in any conventional sense" – a war that will be fought entirely within his own mind. Bodies and landscapes are constantly confused ("Dr Nathan found himself looking at what seemed a dune top, but was in fact an immensely magnified portion of the skin area over the iliac crest"; "he found himself walking between the corroding breasts of the film-actress"; "these cliff-towers revealed the first spinal landscapes"; etc). At other times the protagonist seems to see the entire world and life around him as nothing more than a vast geometrical equation, such as when he observes a woman pacing around the apartment he has rented: "This [...] woman was a modulus [...] by multiplying her into the space/time of the apartment, he could obtain a valid unit for his own existence."

== Chapter or story titles ==
1. The Atrocity Exhibition. New Worlds, Vol. 50, No. 166, September 1966 (excerpt).
2. The University of Death. Transatlantic Review, No. 29, London, Summer 1968.
3. The Assassination Weapon. New Worlds, Vol. 50, No. 161, April 1966.
4. You: Coma: Marilyn Monroe. Ambit No. 27, Spring 1966.
5. Notes Towards a Mental Breakdown. New Worlds July 1967 (excerpt).
6. The Great American Nude. Ambit No. 36 Summer 1968.
7. The Summer Cannibals. New Worlds No. 186 January 1969.
8. Tolerances of the Human Face. Encounter Vol. 33, No. 3, September 1969.
9. You and Me and the Continuum. Impulse, Vol. 1, No. 1, March 1966.
10. Plan for the Assassination of Jacqueline Kennedy. Ambit # 31, Spring 1967.
11. Love and Napalm: Export USA Circuit No. 6, June 1968.
12. Crash! ICA-Eventsheet February 1969 (excerpt).
13. The Generations of America. New Worlds No. 183, October 1968.
14. Why I Want to Fuck Ronald Reagan. Brighton: Unicorn Bookshop, 1968
15. The Assassination of John Fitzgerald Kennedy Considered as a Downhill Motor Race. Ambit No. 29, Autumn 1966.

=== Appendix (added in 1990) ===
- Princess Margaret's Facelift. New Worlds No. 199, March 1970.
- Mae West's Reduction Mammoplasty. Ambit No. 44, Summer 1970.
- Queen Elizabeth's Rhinoplasty. TriQuarterly No. 35, Winter 1976.
- The Secret History of World War 3. Ambit No. 114, Autumn 1988.

== References in other media ==
- The book inspired the Joy Division song of the same name from their 1980 album Closer, though Ian Curtis only read the novel after writing the majority of the lyrics.
- Merzbow's album Great American Nude took its name from one of the book's chapters, referencing a series of nudes painted by American pop artist Tom Wesselmann.
- Two tracks on Gary Numan's 1994 album Sacrifice refer to the book: "Love and Napalm", taken from one of the chapter titles; and "A Question of Faith", which includes the line "I'll be your exhibition of atrocity."
- The book inspired Mão Morta's album Pesadelo em Peluche.
- The book influenced Botch's album We Are the Romans.
- In 2007, the group Exodus released an album with the title The Atrocity Exhibition... Exhibit A.
- The Sheffield group The Comsat Angels are named after one of its short stories.
- Danny Brown's album of the same name borrowed its title from the novel.
- The U.K. hip-hop band Lazy Habits second album is inspired by the novel.
- The multi-media arts collective Left Orbit Temple (1995–present) took inspiration for their name from one of the sub-chapter titles in the book ("Left Orbit and Temple", part four of "The University of Death")
