= Kingdom Come (Ballard novel) =

2006 novel by J. G. Ballard

- First edition cover
- Author: J. G. Ballard
- Language: English
- Genre: Crime
- Publisher: Fourth Estate
- Publication date: 2006
- Publication place: United Kingdom
- Media type: Print (hardcover)
- Pages: 280
- ISBN: 978-0-00-723246-8

Kingdom Come is a 2006 novel by the British writer J. G. Ballard. It is the last novel he wrote before his death in 2009. The book deals with the blurred line between consumerism and fascism. It also deals with the environment and psychogeography of the suburbs. The book starts with, and surrounds, the circumstances of the murder of the father of the book's protagonist, Richard Pearson, in a shopping mall, and his subsequent investigation of the killing.
