= The Complete Short Stories of J. G. Ballard: Volume 2 =

The Complete Short Stories of J. G. Ballard: Volume 2 is a short story collection by J. G. Ballard, published in 2006.

The collection is the second part of J. G. Ballard's complete short story collection, following The Complete Short Stories of J. G. Ballard: Volume 1.

== Stories ==
This second installment of the two-part series contains the following stories:

- "Prisoner of the Coral Deep"
- "The Lost Leonardo"
- "The Terminal Beach"
- "The Illuminated Man"
- "The Delta at Sunset"
- "The Drowned Giant"
- "The Gioconda of the Twilight Noon"
- "The Volcano Dances"
- "The Beach Murders"
- "The Day of Forever"
- "The Impossible man"
- "Storm-Bird, Storm-Dreamer"
- "Tomorrow is a Million Years"
- "The Assassination of John Fitzgerald Kennedy Considered as a Downhill Motor Race"
- "Cry Hope, Cry Fury!"
- "The Recognition"
- "The Cloud-Sculptors of Coral D"
- "Why I Want to Fuck Ronald Reagan"
- "The Dead Astronaut"
- "The Comsat Angels"
- "The Killing Ground"
- "A Place and a Time to Die"
- "Say Goodbye to the Wind"
- "The Greatest Television Show on Earth"
- "My Dream of Flying to Wake Island"
- "The Air Disaster"
- "Low-Flying Aircraft"
- "The Life and Death of God"
- "Notes Towards a Mental Breakdown"
- "The 60 Minute Zoom"
- "The Smile"
- "The Dead Time"
- "The Index"
- "The Intensive Care Unit"
- "Theatre of War"
- "Having a Wonderful Time"
- "One Afternoon at Utah Beach"
- "Zodiac 2000"
- "Motel Architecture"
- "A Host of Furious Fancies"
- "News from the Sun"
- "Memories of the Space Age"
- "Myths of the Near Future"
- "Report on an Unidentified Space Station"
- "The Object of the Attack"
- "Answers to a Questionnaire"
- "The Man Who Walked on the Moon"
- "The Secret History of World War 3"
- "Love in a Colder Climate"
- "The Enormous Space"
- "The Largest Theme Park in the World"
- "War Fever"
- "Dream Cargoes"
- "A Guide to Virtual Death"
- "The Message from Mars"
- "Report from an Obscure Planet"

Comparing to the anthology of the same title in 2001, The Ultimate City was missing.
