= Crash (1996 film) =

Film by David Cronenberg

- Theatrical release poster
- Directed by: David Cronenberg
- Screenplay by: David Cronenberg
- Based on: Crash by J. G. Ballard
- Produced by: David Cronenberg
- Starring: James Spader; Holly Hunter; Elias Koteas; Deborah Kara Unger; Rosanna Arquette
- Cinematography: Peter Suschitzky
- Edited by: Ronald Sanders
- Music by: Howard Shore
- Production companies: Alliance Communications; The Movie Network; Telefilm Canada; Recorded Picture Company (uncredited)
- Distributed by: Alliance Releasing
- Release dates: May 17, 1996 (Cannes); October 4, 1996 (Canada)
- Running time: 100 minutes
- Country: Canada
- Language: English
- Budget: $8–10 million
- Box office: $23.2 million

Crash is a 1996 Canadian erotic thriller film written, produced and directed by David Cronenberg, based on J. G. Ballard's 1973 novel of the same name. Starring James Spader, Deborah Kara Unger, Elias Koteas, Holly Hunter and Rosanna Arquette, it follows a film producer who, after surviving a car crash, becomes involved with a group of symphorophiliacs who are aroused by car crashes and tries to rekindle his sexual relationship with his wife.

The film premiered at the Cannes Film Festival, where it received the Special Jury Prize, a unique award that is distinct from the Jury Prize as it is not given annually, but only at the request of the official jury (for example, the previous year, both a Jury Prize and a Special Jury Prize were awarded). When then-jury president Francis Ford Coppola announced the award "for originality, for daring and for audacity", he stated that it had been a controversial choice and that certain jury members "did abstain very passionately". It continued to receive various accolades, including six Genie Awards.

The film's initial release was met with intense controversy and opened to highly divergent reactions from critics; some praised the film for its daring premise and originality, others aimed criticism for having such a strange premise filled with graphic violence and sexual content.

== Plot ==
Film producer James Ballard and his wife, Catherine, are in an open marriage. The couple engages in various trysts, using the intimate details of their extramarital encounters to fuel their own sexual relations. Catherine recounts a sexual encounter she had that day with a stranger in a prop plane hangar, but she was left unsatisfied. When James responds that he did not achieve satisfaction during his own encounter with a coworker due to an interruption by a film crew member, Catherine replies, "Maybe the next one."

One night, while driving home from work, James's car collides head-on with another, killing its male passenger. While trapped in the fused wreckage, Dr. Helen Remington, the driver and the dead passenger's wife, exposes a breast to James as she removes the shoulder harness of her seatbelt.

During his recovery, James encounters Helen again and also meets Robert Vaughan, who shows a keen interest in the brace holding James's shattered leg together. After departing the hospital, Helen and James begin an affair, driven primarily by their shared experience of the car crash. They attend one of Vaughan's cult-like performance pieces, where he meticulously recreates the car crash that killed James Dean using replica cars and stunt drivers. When Department of Transport officials break up the event, James flees with Helen and Vaughan.

James soon becomes one of Vaughan's followers, who fetishize car crashes, obsessively watch car safety test videos, photograph traffic collisions, and recount the deaths of famous people in road accidents. Catherine, who has noticed Vaughan following her in his car on several occasions, begins to fantasize about him and James having sex. Although Vaughan initially claims that he is interested in the "reshaping of the human body by modern technology", his true project is living out the philosophy that the car crash is a "benevolent psychopathology that beckons toward us".

James drives Vaughan's Lincoln convertible around the city while Vaughan picks up a prostitute and has sex with her in the back seat. James and Catherine have sex while Catherine fantasizes about James and Vaughan having sex. Shortly after, James invites Catherine on one of his and Vaughan's drives. They see police search Vaughan's convertible in connection with a pedestrian hit-and-run, leaving Vaughan distressed. On an interstate, they come across a car wreck involving Colin Seagrave, a member of the group who had been planning to authentically recreate the car accident that killed Jayne Mansfield with Vaughan. Amongst the wreckage, the three see Colin's bloodied corpse, dressed in a blonde wig and a dress to resemble Mansfield. Vaughan photographs the scene as they pass by. James notices some unexplained blood on the fender and drives through a car wash while Vaughan and Catherine have sex in the back seat. Back home, Catherine lies in bed with visible, though superficial, wounds from Vaughan's touch, crying while James touches her.

James subsequently has a tryst with Gabrielle, another member of the group, whose legs are clad in restrictive steel braces and who has a vulva-like scar on the back of one of her thighs from a crash injury. He tears her fishnet stockings open and penetrates her scar. Later, Vaughan invites James to visit a tattooist, who inks car emblems on Vaughan's body. Afterward, James and Vaughan have sex in Vaughan's car.

When Vaughan rams his car into Catherine's while it is unattended, he and James aggressively pursue each other. On an overpass, Vaughan intentionally crashes his car, landing on a passenger bus below and killing himself. After Vaughan's death, Gabrielle and Helen visit a junkyard, kissing and affectionately embracing while lying in the wreck of Vaughan's car.

Later, James and Catherine perform a similar stunt, with James pursuing her at high speed on a freeway. Catherine unbuckles her seatbelt as she sees James approaching, and he rams into the back of her car, causing it to topple down into a grassy median. James exits his car and approaches Catherine's, which has flipped upside down. Catherine lies partly under the car, apparently only superficially injured. When James asks if she is okay, she tells him she is not hurt. As the couple kisses and begins to have sex partly underneath the wrecked vehicle, James whispers to a crying Catherine, "Maybe the next one."

== Cast ==
- James Spader as James Ballard
- Holly Hunter as Dr. Helen Remington
- Elias Koteas as Dr. Robert Vaughan
- Deborah Kara Unger as Catherine Ballard
- Rosanna Arquette as Gabrielle
- Peter MacNeill as Colin Seagrave
- Judah Katz as salesman
- Nicky Guadagni as tattooist
- Boyd Banks as Grip
- David Cronenberg as the voice of auto salesman (uncredited)

== Production ==
David Cronenberg had not read any of J. G. Ballard's works and first heard of the novel Crash in the 1980s from a critic who stated that he should adapt it into a film. Jeremy Thomas, who later produced Naked Lunch, spoke to Cronenberg about the book and said that he should read it. Cronenberg was only able to read half of the book as he found it disturbing and said he could not make it into a film. However, he later finished the book and re-read it, saying, "it was obviously an extraordinary book" although "it's not a likable book". Cronenberg said that his agent at Creative Artists Agency told him the film would end his career.

Cronenberg wrote the script without having read any of Ballard's works except Crash and some interviews. Cronenberg's script was mostly faithful to the book, but the ending scene was created by him and he removed some scenes from the book during filming. Attempts were made to add a voice-over in the film, but Cronenberg rejected it later, stating, "I mean, do you want someone to read from the novel?" and that "he somehow felt that you could explain the movie so people would get it". The location was changed from London in the book to Toronto in the film.

The shooting script for the film was purposely kept short at 77 pages due to budgetary constraints and Cronenberg wanting to "shoot slow, with a lot of attention to detail" and to "focus microscopically" on the shorter script. Cronenberg wanted to do a smaller-budgeted film than his recent films. The reduced budget forced Howard Shore to compose the film in Toronto, rather than London, for the first time since Videodrome. Cronenberg was concerned that Peter Suschitzky would be unable to perform the cinematography for the film due to his commitments to Mars Attacks!

The pile-up scene was inspired by Jean-Luc Godard's Weekend.

The film was an international co-production between the British company Recorded Picture Company, and Canadian companies Alliance Communications Corporation, The Movie Network, and Telefilm Canada. It had a budget of $8–10 million.

== Themes ==
For Cronenberg, technology, including the production of automobiles, is the product of the human mind and a kind of natural extension of the human body. He revisits his favorite subject, how modern technology affects people and their sex life, in Crash. He noted that a moment has come in the history of mankind when sex-free artificial reproduction of the species became available: "We could literally put a moratorium on sex for 100 years and we still would not extinguish the human race." The director wonders what the place of sex is in these new conditions.

The novel depicts the world of mankind so alienated and jaded that communication and emotions are possible only through traumatic experiences, such as a car accident. In the fantasy, semi-abstract world of Ballard and Cronenberg, the vectors of thanatos and eros coincide in a single act of intercourse through man-made technology. Jonathan Rosenbaum notes that in the film, human skin is likened to the glitzy, fetishized surface of cars; the camera slides seamlessly from one to the other. The "chosen ones", a secret society that reads like the fight club in Palahniuk's novel, perceive vehicles and accidents as a fetish.

== Release ==
The film was shown at the Cannes Film Festival on 17 May 1996. It was theatrically released in Canada in November 1996, and the United Kingdom in June 1997. Crash was the first film to receive a NC-17 in the United States since Showgirls.

Two 4K restorations were released in 2020 by Arrow Films and The Criterion Collection.

== Reception and legacy ==
=== Controversies ===
The film was controversial, as was the book, because of its vivid depictions of graphic sexual acts instigated by violence.

At the Cannes Film Festival, a screening provoked boos and angry bolts by upset viewers. In a 2020 interview, Cronenberg stated that he believed Francis Ford Coppola, the jury president at the 1996 Cannes Film Festival, was so vehemently opposed to Crash that other jury members in favor of the film banded together to present Cronenberg with a rare Special Jury Prize. So great was Coppola's distaste for the film that, according to Cronenberg, Coppola refused to personally present the award to the director.

The controversial subject matter prompted the Daily Mail and the Evening Standard to orchestrate an aggressive campaign to ban Crash in the United Kingdom. In response to this outcry, the British Board of Film Classification (BBFC) inquired with a Queen's Counsel and a psychologist, none of whom found any justification to ban it, and 11 disabled people, who saw no offense with its portrayal of the physically challenged. Seeing no evidence for a ban, Crash was passed by the BBFC uncut with an 18 rating in March 1997. Clive Barker stated that the importance of family values and morality during the 1997 general election fuelled the controversy due to local authorities in Cardiff, Kirklees, North Lanarkshire, Walsall and Westminster banning the film.

A theater manager in Oslo, Norway, banned the film at her location. She denied it was related to a traffic accident that left her husband paralysed.

Media mogul Ted Turner, whose company oversaw U.S. distributor Fine Line Features, refused to release the film in the United States, going so far as to pull it from an October 1996 release date intended to coincide with the Canadian rollout. Cronenberg would later confirm that a Fine Line executive shared the rumor that Turner's distaste for the movie was the reason for its delay. He said Turner was morally offended and concerned about "copycat incidents". The film eventually received a U.S. release in Spring 1997.

AMC Entertainment Inc., the second-largest U.S. theater chain at the time, said it was posting security guards outside about 30 screens showing the movie to ensure minors did not get inside. At AMC's Century City location in Los Angeles, two security guards were present, one inside the auditorium and one outside.

The film was still banned by Westminster Council, meaning it could not be shown in any cinema in the West End, even though they had earlier given special permission for the film's premiere, and it was easily seen in nearby Camden.

An academic study of the controversy and audience responses to it, written by Martin Barker, Jane Arthurs and Ramaswami Harindranath, was published by Wallflower Press in 2001, entitled The Crash Controversy: Censorship Campaigns and Film Reception.

=== Critical reception ===
On review aggregator Rotten Tomatoes, the film has an approval rating of 66% based on 64 reviews, with an average score of 6.8/10. The consensus reads: "Despite the surprisingly distant, clinical direction, Crash's explicit premise and sex is classic Cronenberg territory." On Metacritic, the film's score is listed as 53 out of 100, as determined by 23 critics, indicating "mixed or average reviews".

In his contemporary review, Roger Ebert gave the film 3.5 out of 4 stars, writing:

Crash is about characters entranced by a sexual fetish that, in fact, no one has. Cronenberg has made a movie that is pornographic in form, but not in result ... [Crash is] like a porno movie made by a computer: It downloads gigabytes of information about sex, it discovers our love affair with cars, and it combines them in a mistaken algorithm. The result is challenging, courageous and original—a dissection of the mechanics of pornography. I admired it, although I cannot say I "liked" it.

J. Hoberman praised the film highly, noting the melancholy overtones and unconventional dry humor that includes cars mimicking human sexual activity or vice versa (for instance, "a close-up of an automatic car window slowly rising, the running-gag equation of tailgating and rear-entry intercourse"). BBC film critic Mark Kermode has described Crash as "pretty much perfect" and praised Howard Shore's score, while admitting that it's a "hard film to like" and describing the cast's performances as "glacial".

In 2000, a poll done by The Village Voice of film critics listed Crash as the 35th Best Film of the 1990s. A similar poll done by Cahiers du cinéma placed it eighth. In 2005 the staff of Total Film listed it at No. 21 on their list of the all-time greatest films. Slant Magazine selected it as one of their "100 Essential Films".

In 2002, Parveen Adams, an academic who specializes in art/film/performance and psychoanalysis, argued that the flat texture of the film, achieved through various cinematic devices, prevent the viewer from identifying with the characters in the way one might with a more mainstream film. Instead of vicariously enjoying the sex and injury, the viewer finds himself a disimpassioned voyeur. Adams additionally noted that the scars borne by the characters are old and bloodless—in other words, the wounds lack vitality. The wound is "not traumatizing" but, rather, "a condition of our psychical and social life".

In a 1996 interview with the Vancouver Sun, Cronenberg said Italian film director Bernardo Bertolucci told him "the film was a religious masterpiece." On At the Movies with Roger Ebert, director Martin Scorsese ranked Crash as the eighth best film of the decade.

Of the adaptation, author J. G. Ballard reportedly said, "The movie is actually better than the book. It goes further than the book, and is much more powerful and dynamic. It's terrific." He promoted Cronenberg's work in his native country.

=== Accolades ===
The film was nominated for the Palme d'Or at the Cannes Film Festival. In the end, it won the Special Jury Prize. Cannes jury president Francis Ford Coppola noted that "certain [jury] members did abstain very passionately" from endorsing Cronenberg's film, but added that it was important to give Crash an award, "even though in mining some truth of the human condition it offended [certain viewers]". However, other accounts have suggested it was Coppola himself who did not like the film, with producer Jeremy Thomas later saying, "It touched a nerve with him." In a 2020 interview for the film's 4K restoration, Cronenberg said Coppola was the main dissent on the support for the film on the Cannes jury, adding that "he wouldn't hand me the award" and got someone else to do it.

The film received six Genie Awards from the Academy of Canadian Cinema and Television, including awards for Cronenberg as director and screenwriter; the film was also nominated in two further categories, including Best Picture.

At the 1997 Stinkers Bad Movie Awards, the film was filed under the Founders Award, which lamented the year's biggest studio disgraces, and stated, "How Oscar winner Holly Hunter and the usually reliable James Spader and Rosanna Arquette got suckered into this mess is a mystery."

The film was nominated for The Motion Picture Sound Editors Association's Golden Reel Award for Best Sound Editing for a Foreign Feature. It also won the 1996 Cahiers du Cinéma Award for Best Film and was number eight on their list of Best Films of the 1990s.

In 2019, it topped the British Film Institute's list of the 90 best films of the 1990s.

== See also ==
- Titane – the 2021 Palme d'Or winner similar in content
- Extreme cinema
- List of cult films

== Works cited ==
- Cronenberg, David (2006). David Cronenberg: Interviews with Serge Grünberg. Plexus Publishing. ISBN 0859653765.
- Mathijs, Ernest (2008). The Cinema of David Cronenberg: From Baron of Blood to Cultural Hero. Wallflower Press. ISBN 9781905674657.
- Rodley, Chris, ed. (1997). Cronenberg on Cronenberg. Faber and Faber. ISBN 0571191371.
