= The Sound-Sweep =

Short story by J. G. Ballard

"The Sound-Sweep" is a short story by British writer J. G. Ballard. It was first published in Science Fantasy, Volume 13, Number 39, February 1960 and was reprinted in the collection The Four-Dimensional Nightmare.

== Plot summary ==
The main character, a mute boy vacuuming up stray sounds in a world without music, befriends an opera singer living in an abandoned recording studio. As all previous music has been rendered obsolete thanks to advances in "ultrasonic music", the opera singer is destitute.

== Reception ==
According to Trevor Horn and Bruce Woolley, the lyrics of the song "Video Killed the Radio Star" by The Buggles were inspired by this story of a world where audible music is superseded by developments in new technology.
