= Crash (Ballard novel) =

1973 novel by J. G. Ballard

- Cover of first edition (hardcover) by Bill Botten
- Author: J. G. Ballard
- Language: English
- Genre: Postmodern novel, transgressive fiction, dystopian
- Publisher: Jonathan Cape
- Publication date: June 1973
- Publication place: United Kingdom
- Media type: Print (Hardcover and paperback)
- Pages: 224
- ISBN: 0-224-00782-3
- OCLC: 797233
- Dewey Decimal: 823/.9/14
- LC Class: PZ4.B1893 Cp PR6052.A46

Crash is a novel by J. G. Ballard, first published in 1973 with a cover designed by Bill Botten. It follows a group of car-crash fetishists who, inspired by the famous crashes of celebrities, become sexually aroused by staging and participating in car accidents.

The novel was released to divided critical reception, with many reviewers horrified by its provocative content. It was adapted into a controversial 1996 film of the same name by David Cronenberg.

== Synopsis ==
The story is told through the eyes of narrator James Ballard, named after the author himself, but it centers on the sinister figure of Dr. Robert Vaughan, a former TV scientist turned "nightmare angel of the highways". James meets Vaughan after being injured in a car crash near London Airport. Gathering around Vaughan is a group of alienated people, all of them former crash victims, who follow him in his pursuit to re-enact the crashes of Hollywood celebrities such as Jayne Mansfield and James Dean, in order to experience what the narrator calls "a new sexuality, born from a perverse technology". Vaughan's ultimate fantasy is to die in a head-on collision with movie star Elizabeth Taylor.

== Development ==
The Papers of J. G. Ballard at the British Library include two revised drafts of Crash (Add MS 88938/3/8). Scanned extracts from Ballard's drafts are included in Crash: The Collector's Edition, ed. Chris Beckett.

In 1971, Harley Cokeliss directed a short film entitled Crash! based on a chapter in J. G. Ballard's book The Atrocity Exhibition, where Ballard is featured, talking about the ideas in his book. Gabrielle Drake portrayed a passenger and car-crash victim. Ballard later developed the idea, resulting in Crash. In his draft of the novel he mentioned Drake by name, but references to her were removed from the published version.

== Interpretation ==
Throughout ''Crash'' I have used the car not only as a sexual image, but as a total metaphor for man's life in today's society. As such the novel has a political role quite apart from its sexual content, but I would still like to think that ''Crash'' is the first pornographic novel based on technology. In a sense, pornography is the most political form of fiction, dealing with how we use and exploit each other in the most urgent and ruthless way. Needless to say, the ultimate role of ''Crash'' is cautionary, a warning against that brutal, erotic and overlit realm that beckons more and more persuasively to us from the margins of the technological landscape. - J. G. Ballard, Crash

Crash has been difficult to characterize as a novel. At some points in his career, Ballard claimed that Crash was a "cautionary tale", a view that he would later regret, asserting that it is in fact "a psychopathic hymn. But it is a psychopathic hymn which has a point". Likewise, Ballard previously characterized it a science fiction novel, a position he would later take back.

Jean Baudrillard wrote an analysis of Crash in Simulacra and Simulation in which he declared it "the first great novel of the universe of simulation". He made note of how the fetish in the story conflates the functionality of the automobiles with that of the human body and how the characters' injuries and the damage to the vehicles are used as equivalent signs. To him, the hyperfunctionality leads to the dysfunction in the story. Quotes were used extensively to illustrate that the language of the novel employs plain, mechanical terms for the parts of the automobile and proper, medical language for human sex organs and acts. The story is interpreted as showing a merger between technology, sexuality, and death, and he further argued that by pointing out Vaughan's character takes and keeps photos of the car crashes and the mutilated bodies involved. Baudrillard stated that there is no moral judgment about the events within the novel but that Ballard himself intended it as a warning against a cultural trend.

The story can be classed as dystopic.

== Critical reception ==
The novel received divided reviews when originally published. One publisher's reader returned the verdict "This author is beyond psychiatric help. Do Not Publish!" A 1973 review in The New York Times was equally horrified: "Crash is, hands-down, the most repulsive book I've yet to come across."

However, retrospective opinion now considers Crash to be one of Ballard's best and most challenging works. Reassessing Crash in The Guardian, Zadie Smith wrote, "Crash is an existential book about how everybody uses everything. How everything uses everybody. And yet it is not a hopeless vision." On Ballard's legacy, she writes: "In Ballard's work there is always this mix of futuristic dread and excitement, a sweet spot where dystopia and utopia converge. For we cannot say we haven't got precisely what we dreamed of, what we always wanted, so badly."

== References in popular art ==
=== Music ===
The Normal's 1978 song "Warm Leatherette" was inspired by the novel, and later covered in 1980 by Grace Jones. Similarly inspired was "Miss the Girl," a 1983 single by the Creatures. The Glenn Danzig penned “Kiss of Steel” which appeared on 1986’s Samhain III: November Coming-Fire clearly shares thematic and lyrical parallels. The Manic Street Preachers' song "Mausoleum" from 1994's The Holy Bible contains the famous Ballard quote about his reasons for writing the book, "I wanted to rub the human face in its own vomit. I wanted to force it to look in the mirror." John Foxx's album Metamatic contains songs that have Ballardian themes, such as "No-one Driving".

=== Other film adaptations ===
An apparently unauthorized adaptation of Crash called Nightmare Angel was filmed in 1986 by Susan Emerling and Zoe Beloff. This short film bears the credit "Inspired by J. G. Ballard".

== See also ==
- Autassassinophilia
