= The Overloaded Man =

Book by J.G. Ballard

- Cover of the first edition.
- Author: J. G. Ballard
- Cover artist: Ray Ginghofer
- Language: English
- Genre: Science fiction
- Publisher: Panther Books
- Publication date: 1967
- Publication place: United Kingdom
- Media type: Print (hardback)
- Pages: 158 pp

The Overloaded Man is a collection of science fiction stories by British writer J. G. Ballard, first published in 1967 as a paperback by Panther Books.

== Contents ==
- "Now: Zero" - A man discovers that he can cause deaths by writing about them in his notebook.
- "The Time-Tombs"
- "Thirteen to Centaurus"
- "Track 12"
- "Passport to Eternity"
- "Escapement"
- "Time of Passage"
- "The Venus Hunters"
- "The Coming of the Unconscious"
- "The Overloaded Man"

The first seven stories are science fiction and fantasy originally published in the 1950s and early 1960s.

"The Venus Hunters" is concerned less with aliens than with our need to believe in them. "The Coming of the Unconscious" is an essay on surrealism in art. The protagonist of "The Overloaded Man" reduces his perception of the world to abstract forms and colours: this has been called "the death of affect".
