= Empire of the Sun (novel) =

1984 novel by J. G. Ballard

- Cover of the first edition (hardback)
- Author: J. G. Ballard
- Cover artist: Pat Doyle
- Language: English
- Genre: Autobiographical, War
- Publisher: Gollancz
- Publication date: 13 September 1984
- Publication place: United Kingdom
- Media type: Print (Hardback & Paperback)
- Pages: 278 pp (first edition, hardback)
- ISBN: 0-575-03483-1 (first edition, hardback)
- OCLC: 260149687
- LC Class: PR6052.A46 E45x 1984b
- Followed by: The Kindness of Women

Empire of the Sun is a 1984 novel by English writer J. G. Ballard; it was awarded the Guardian Fiction Prize, the James Tait Black Memorial Prize and was shortlisted for the Booker Prize. Like Ballard's earlier short story "The Dead Time" (published in the anthology Myths of the Near Future), it is essentially fiction but draws extensively on Ballard's experiences in World War II. The name of the novel is derived from the etymology of the name for Japan.

Ballard later wrote of his experiences in China as a boy and the making of the film of the same name in his autobiography Miracles of Life.

== Plot ==
The novel recounts the story of a young English boy, Jamie ("Jim") Graham (named after Ballard's two first names, "James Graham"), who lives with his parents in Shanghai. After the Pearl Harbor attack, Japan occupies the Shanghai International Settlement, and in the following chaos Jim becomes separated from his parents.

He spends some time in abandoned mansions, living on remnants of packaged food. Having exhausted the food supplies, he decides to try to surrender to the Imperial Japanese Army. After many attempts, he finally succeeds and is interned in the Lunghua Civilian Assembly Centre.

Although the Japanese are "officially" the enemies, Jim identifies partly with them, both because he adores the pilots with their splendid machines and because he feels that Lunghua is still a comparatively safer place for him.

Towards the end of the war, with the Japanese army collapsing, the food supply runs short. Jim barely survives, with people around him starving to death. The camp prisoners are forced upon a march to Nantao, with many dying along the route. Jim then leaves the march and is saved from starvation by air drops from American bombers. Jim returns to Lunghua camp, soon returning to his pre-war residence with his parents.

== Film adaptation ==
The book was adapted by Tom Stoppard in 1987. The screenplay was filmed by Steven Spielberg, to critical acclaim, being nominated for six Oscars and winning three BAFTA awards (for cinematography, music and sound). It starred a then 13-year-old Christian Bale, as well as John Malkovich and Miranda Richardson.

== Sources ==
- Rossi, Umberto (2008). "Mind is the Battlefield: Reading Ballard's 'Life Trilogy' as War Literature". In J. Baxter (ed.). J.G. Ballard, Contemporary Critical Perspectives. London: Continuum. pp. 66–77.
