= J. G. Ballard =

English writer (1930–2009)

- Ballard in 1984
- Born: James Graham Ballard; 15 November 1930; Shanghai International Settlement
- Died: 19 April 2009 (aged 78); Shepperton, England
- Resting place: Kensal Green Cemetery
- Education: Lunghua Academy; The Leys School; King's College, Cambridge; Queen Mary University of London
- Occupations: Novelist, satirist, short story writer, essayist
- Spouse: Helen Mary Matthews (m. 1955; died 1964)
- Children: 3, including Bea Ballard
- Writing career
- Genres: Dystopian fiction; Satire; Science fiction; Transgressive fiction
- Notable works: Crash; Empire of the Sun; High-Rise; The Atrocity Exhibition
- Movement: New Wave

James Graham Ballard (15 November 1930 – 19 April 2009) was an English novelist and short-story writer, satirist and essayist known for psychologically provocative works of fiction that explore the relations between human psychology, technology, sex and mass media. Ballard first became associated with New Wave science fiction for post-apocalyptic novels such as The Drowned World (1962). He later courted controversy with the short-story collection The Atrocity Exhibition (1970), which includes the 1968 story "Why I Want to Fuck Ronald Reagan", and later the novel Crash (1973), a story about car-crash fetishists.

In 1984, Ballard won broad critical recognition for the war novel Empire of the Sun, a semi-autobiographical story of the experiences of a British boy during the Japanese occupation of Shanghai. Three years later, the American film director Steven Spielberg adapted the novel into a film of the same name. The novelist's journey from youth to mid-age is chronicled, with fictional inflections, in The Kindness of Women (1991), and in the autobiography Miracles of Life (2008). Some of Ballard's early novels have been adapted as films, including Crash (1996), directed by David Cronenberg, and High-Rise (2015), an adaptation of the 1975 novel directed by Ben Wheatley.

From the distinct nature of the literary fiction of J. G. Ballard arose the adjective Ballardian, defined as: "resembling or suggestive of the conditions described in J. G. Ballard's novels and stories, especially dystopian modernity, bleak man-made landscapes, and the psychological effects of technological, social or environmental developments". The Oxford Dictionary of National Biography describes the novelist Ballard as preoccupied with "Eros, Thanatos, mass media and emergent technologies".

== Life ==
=== Shanghai ===
J. G. Ballard was born to Edna Johnstone (1905–1998) and James Graham Ballard (1901–1966), who was a chemist at the Calico Printers' Association, a textile company in the city of Manchester, and later became the chairman and managing director of the China Printing and Finishing Company, the Association's subsidiary company in Shanghai. The China in which Ballard was born featured the Shanghai International Settlement, where Western foreigners "lived an American style of life". At school age, Ballard attended the Cathedral School of the Holy Trinity Church, Shanghai. Upon the outbreak of the Second Sino-Japanese War (1937–1945), the Ballard family abandoned their suburban house, and moved to a house in the city centre of Shanghai to avoid the warfare between the Chinese defenders and the Japanese invaders.

After the Battle of Hong Kong (8–25 December 1941), the Imperial Japanese Army occupied the International Settlement and imprisoned its Allied civilians in early 1943. The Ballard family were sent to the Lunghua Civilian Assembly Centre where they lived in G-block, a two-storey residence for 40 families, for the remainder of the Second World War. At the Lunghua Centre, Ballard attended school, where the teachers were prisoners with a profession. In the autobiography Miracles of Life, Ballard said that those experiences of displacement and imprisonment were the thematic bases of the novel Empire of the Sun.

Concerning the violence found in Ballard's fiction, the novelist Martin Amis said that Empire of the Sun "gives shape to what shaped him." About his experiences of the Japanese war in China, Ballard said: "I don't think you can go through the experience of war without one's perceptions of the world being forever changed. The reassuring stage-set that everyday reality in the suburban West presents to us is torn down; you see the ragged scaffolding, and then you see the truth beyond that, and it can be a frightening experience." "I have—I won't say happy—[but] not unpleasant memories of the camp... I remember a lot of the casual brutality and beatings-up that went on—but, at the same time, we children were playing a hundred and one games all the time!" In his later life, Ballard became an atheist, yet said: "I'm extremely interested in religion ... I see religion as a key to all sorts of mysteries that surround the human consciousness."

=== Britain and Canada ===
In late 1945, Ballard, his mother and his sister returned on SS Arawa to England, where they lived in Plymouth and he attended The Leys School in Cambridge, winning a prize for a well-written essay. Within a few years, Mrs Ballard and her daughter returned to China and rejoined Mr Ballard; and, while not at school, Ballard lived with grandparents. In 1949, he studied medicine at King's College, Cambridge, with the intention of becoming a psychiatrist.

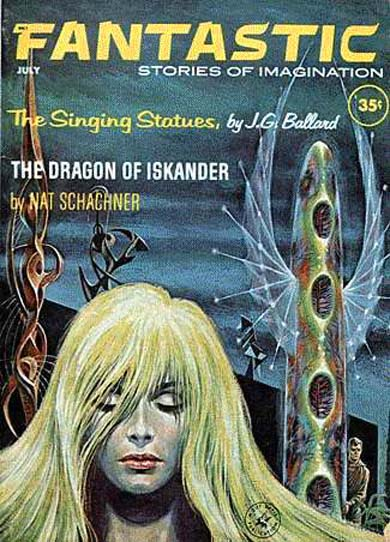
Ballard's Vermilion Sands story "The Singing Statues" took the cover of the July 1962 issue of Fantastic, featuring artwork by Ed Emshwiller.

At university, Ballard wrote avant-garde fiction influenced by psychoanalysis and the works of surrealist painters, and pursued writing fiction and medicine. In his second year at Cambridge, in May 1951, the short story "The Violent Noon", a Hemingway pastiche, won a crime-story competition and was published in the Varsity newspaper. In October 1951, encouraged by publication, and believing that a career in clinical medicine would allow little time for writing fiction, Ballard forsook medicine and enrolled at Queen Mary College to read English literature. After a year, he quit the College and worked as an advertising copywriter, then worked as an itinerant encyclopaedia salesman. Throughout that odd-job period, Ballard continued writing short-story fiction but found no publisher.

In early 1954, Ballard joined the Royal Air Force and was assigned to the Royal Canadian Air Force flight-training base in Moose Jaw, Saskatchewan, Canada. In that time, he encountered American science fiction magazines, and, in due course, wrote his first science fiction story, "Passport to Eternity", a pastiche of the American science fiction genre; yet the story was not published until 1962.

In 1955, Ballard left the RAF and returned to England, where he met and married Helen Mary Matthews, who was a secretary at the Daily Express newspaper; the first of three Ballard children was born in 1956. In December 1956, Ballard became a professional science-fiction writer with the publication of the short stories "Escapement" (in New Worlds magazine) and "Prima Belladonna" (in Science Fantasy magazine). At the New Worlds magazine, the editor, Edward J. Carnell, greatly supported Ballard's science-fiction writing, and published most of his early stories.

From 1958 onwards, Ballard was assistant editor of the scientific journal Chemistry and Industry. His interest in art involved the emerging Pop Art movement, and, in the late 1950s, Ballard exhibited collages that represented his ideas for a new kind of novel. Moreover, his avant-garde inclinations discomfited writers of mainstream science fiction, whose artistic attitudes Ballard considered philistine. Briefly attending the 1957 World Science Fiction Convention in London, Ballard left disillusioned and demoralised by the type and quality of the science-fiction writing he encountered, and did not write another story for a year; however, by 1965, he was fiction editor of Ambit, an avante-garde magazine, which had an editorial remit amenable to his aesthetic ideals. With his friend Michael Moorcock he began a project to revitalise literature through use of science fiction tropes.

=== Professional writer ===
In 1960, the Ballard family moved to Shepperton, Surrey, where he lived till his death in 2009. To become a professional writer, Ballard forsook mainstream employment to write his first novel, The Wind from Nowhere (1962), during a fortnight holiday, and quit his editorial job with the Chemistry and Industry magazine. Later that year, his second novel, The Drowned World (1962), also was published; those two novels established Ballard as a notable writer of New Wave science fiction; he also popularized the related concept and genre of inner space. From that success followed the publication of short-story collections, and was the beginning of a great period of literary productivity from which emerged the short-story collection The Terminal Beach (1964).

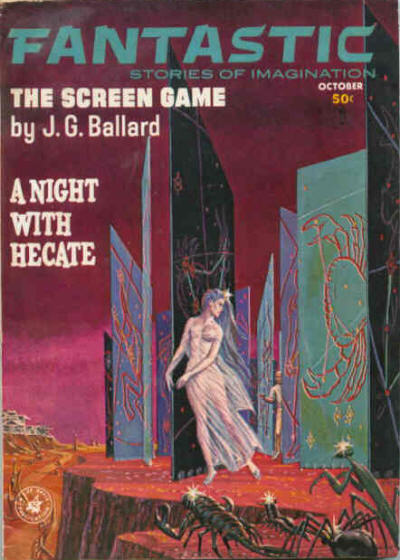
Another Emshwiller cover illustrating the Vermilion Sands story "The Screen Game" (1963)

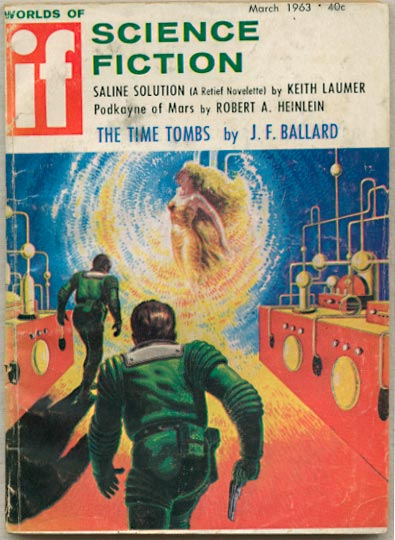
Ballard's novelette "The Time Tombs" was the cover story on the March 1963 issue of If.

In 1964, Mary Ballard died of pneumonia, leaving Ballard to raise their three children, James, Fay and Bea Ballard. Michael Moorcock introduced Ballard to Claire Walsh; she later became his partner, though they never married. Claire Walsh worked in publishing during the 1960s and the 1970s, and was Ballard's sounding board for his story ideas. Later, Claire introduced Ballard to the expatriate community in Sophia Antipolis, in southern France; those expatriates provided grist for the writer's mill.

In 1965, Ballard wrote a set of thematically-related short stories that were published in New Worlds by Moorcock and later in book form as The Atrocity Exhibition (1970). In 1967, the novelist Algis Budrys said that Brian W. Aldiss, Roger Zelazny, Samuel R. Delany and J. G. Ballard were the leading writers of New Wave Science Fiction. In the event, The Atrocity Exhibition proved legally controversial in the U.S., because the publisher feared libel-and-slander lawsuits by the living celebrities who featured in the science fiction stories. In The Atrocity Exhibition, the story titled "Crash!" deals with the psychosexuality of car-crash enthusiasts; in 1970, at the New Arts Laboratory, Ballard sponsored an exhibition of damaged automobiles titled "Crashed Cars"; lacking the commentary of an art curator, the artwork provoked critical vitriol and layman vandalism. In the story "Crash!" and in the "Crashed Cars" exhibition, Ballard presented and explored the sexual potential in a car crash, which theme he also explored in a short film made with Gabrielle Drake in 1971. Those interests produced the novel Crash (1973), which features a protagonist named James Ballard, who lives in Shepperton, Surrey, England.

Crash was also controversial upon publication. In 1996, the film adaptation by David Cronenberg was met by a tabloid uproar in the UK, with the Daily Mail campaigning for it to be banned. In the years following the initial publication of Crash, Ballard produced two further novels: 1974's Concrete Island, about a man stranded in the traffic-divider island of a high-speed motorway, and High-Rise, about a modern luxury high-rise apartment building's descent into tribal warfare.

Ballard published several novels and short story collections throughout the 1970s and 1980s, but his breakthrough into the mainstream came with Empire of the Sun in 1984, based on his years in Shanghai and the Lunghua internment camp. It became a best-seller, was shortlisted for the Booker Prize and awarded the Guardian Fiction Prize and James Tait Black Memorial Prize for fiction. It made Ballard known to a wider audience, although the books that followed failed to achieve the same degree of success. Empire of the Sun was filmed by Steven Spielberg in 1987, starring a young Christian Bale as Jim (Ballard). Ballard himself appears briefly in the film, and he has described the experience of seeing his childhood memories reenacted and reinterpreted as bizarre.

Ballard continued to write until the end of his life, and also contributed occasional journalism and criticism to the British press. Of his later novels, Super-Cannes (2000) was well received, winning the regional Commonwealth Writers' Prize. These later novels often marked a move away from science fiction, instead engaging with elements of a traditional crime novel. Ballard was offered a CBE in 2003, but refused, calling it "a Ruritanian charade that helps to prop up our top-heavy monarchy". In June 2006, he was diagnosed with terminal prostate cancer, which metastasised to his spine and ribs. The last of his books published in his lifetime was the autobiography Miracles of Life, written after his diagnosis. His final published short story, "The Dying Fall", appeared in the 1996 issue 106 of Interzone, a British sci-fi magazine. It was later reproduced in The Guardian on 25 April 2009. He was buried in Kensal Green Cemetery.

=== Posthumous publication ===
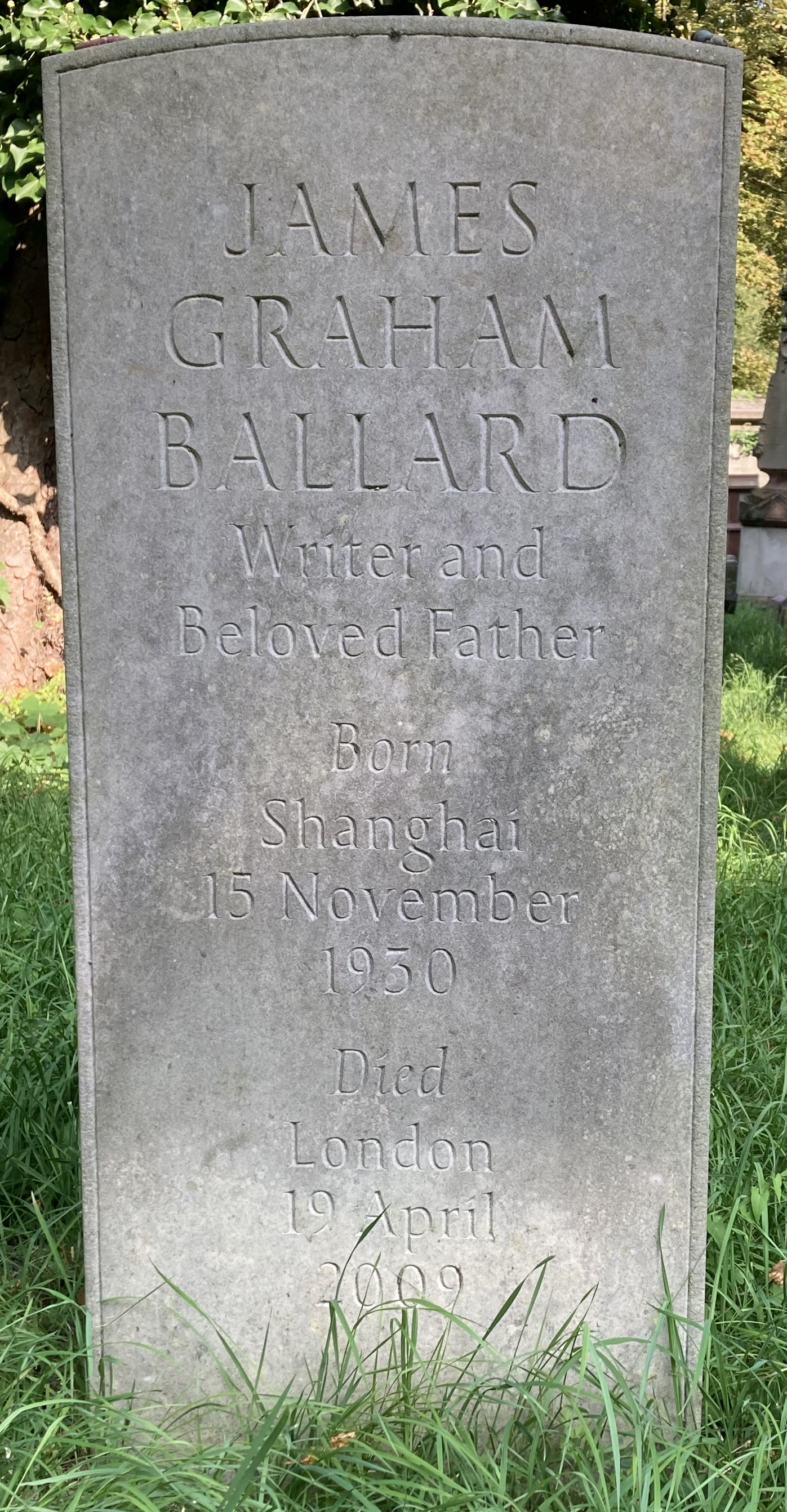
Ballard's grave in Kensal Green Cemetery

In October 2008, before his death, Ballard's literary agent, Margaret Hanbury, brought an outline for a book by Ballard with the working title Conversations with My Physician: The Meaning, if Any, of Life to the Frankfurt Book Fair. The physician in question is oncologist Professor Jonathan Waxman of Imperial College London, who was treating Ballard for prostate cancer. While it was to be in part a book about cancer, and Ballard's struggle with it, it reportedly was to move on to broader themes. In April 2009 The Guardian reported that HarperCollins announced that Ballard's Conversations with My Physician could not be finished and plans to publish it were abandoned.

In May, 2009 the New Yorker published the short story The Autobiography of J.G.B.

In 2013, a 17-page untitled typescript listed as "Vermilion Sands short story in draft" in the British Library catalogue and edited into an 8,000-word text by Bernard Sigaud appeared in a short-lived French reissue of the collection by Éditions Tristram (ISBN 978-2367190068) under the title "Le labyrinthe Hardoon" as the first story of the cycle, tentatively dated "late 1955/early 1956" by B. Sigaud, David Pringle and Christopher J. Beckett. Reports From the Deep End, an anthology of short stories inspired by J. G. Ballard (London: Titan Books, 2023, edited by Maxim Jakubowski and Rick McGrath), could have included "The Hardoon Labyrinth"—the original edition by B. Sigaud enriched to about 9,400 words by D. Pringle—but opposition from the J. G. Ballard Estate terminated the project.

=== Archive ===
In June 2010 the British Library acquired Ballard's personal archives under the British government's acceptance in lieu scheme for death duties. The archive contains eighteen holograph manuscripts for Ballard's novels, including the 840-page manuscript for Empire of the Sun, plus correspondence, notebooks, and photographs from throughout his life. In addition, two typewritten manuscripts for The Unlimited Dream Company are held at the Harry Ransom Center at the University of Texas at Austin.

== Dystopian fiction ==
With the exception of his autobiographical novels, Ballard most commonly wrote in the post-apocalyptic dystopia genre.

His most celebrated novel in this regard is Crash, in which the characters (the protagonist, called Ballard, included) become increasingly obsessed with the violent psychosexuality of car crashes in general, and celebrity car crashes in particular. Ballard's novel was turned into a controversial film by David Cronenberg.

Particularly revered among Ballard's admirers is his short story collection Vermilion Sands (1971), set in an eponymous desert resort town inhabited by forgotten starlets, insane heirs, very eccentric artists, and the merchants and bizarre servants who provide for them. Each story features peculiarly exotic technology such as cloud-carving sculptors performing for a party of eccentric onlookers, poetry-composing computers, orchids with operatic voices and egos to match, phototropic self-painting canvases, etc. In keeping with Ballard's central themes, most notably technologically mediated masochism, these tawdry and weird technologies service the dark and hidden desires and schemes of the human castaways who occupy Vermilion Sands, typically with psychologically grotesque and physically fatal results. In his introduction to Vermilion Sands, Ballard cites this as his favourite collection.

In a similar vein, his collection Memories of the Space Age explores many varieties of individual and collective psychological fallout from—and initial deep archetypal motivations for—the American space exploration boom of the 1960s and 1970s.

Will Self has described much of his fiction as being concerned with "idealised gated communities; the affluent, and the ennui of affluence [where] the virtualised world is concretised in the shape of these gated developments." He added in these fictional settings "there is no real pleasure to be gained; sex is commodified and devoid of feeling and there is no relationship with the natural world. These communities then implode into some form of violence." Algis Budrys, however, mocked his fiction as "call[ing] for people who don't think... to be the protagonist of a J. G. Ballard novel or anything more than a very minor character therein, you must have cut yourself off from the entire body of scientific education".

In addition to his novels, Ballard made extensive use of the short story form. Many of his earliest published works in the 1950s and 1960s were short stories, including influential works like Chronopolis. In an essay on Ballard, Will Wiles notes how his short stories "have a lingering fascination with the domestic interior, with furnishing and appliances", adding, "it's a landscape that he distorts until it shrieks with anxiety". He concludes that "what Ballard saw, and what he expressed in his novels, was nothing less than the effect that the technological world, including our built environment, was having upon our minds and bodies."

Ballard coined the term inverted Crusoeism. Whereas the original Robinson Crusoe became a castaway against his own will, Ballard's protagonists often choose to maroon themselves; hence inverted Crusoeism (e.g., Concrete Island). The concept provides a reason as to why people would deliberately maroon themselves on a remote island; in Ballard's work, becoming a castaway is as much a healing and empowering process as an entrapping one, enabling people to discover a more meaningful and vital existence.

== Television ==
On 13 December 1965, BBC Two screened an adaptation of the short story "Thirteen to Centaurus" directed by Peter Potter. The one-hour drama formed part of the first season of Out of the Unknown and starred Donald Houston as Dr. Francis and James Hunter as Abel Granger. In 2003, Ballard's short story "The Enormous Space" (first published in the science-fiction magazine Interzone in 1989, subsequently printed in the collection of Ballard's short stories War Fever) was adapted into an hour-long television film for the BBC entitled Home by Richard Curson Smith, who also directed it. The plot follows a middle-class man who chooses to abandon the outside world and restrict himself to his house, becoming a hermit.

== Influence ==
Ballard is cited as an important forebear of the cyberpunk movement by Bruce Sterling in his introduction to the Mirrorshades anthology, and by author William Gibson. Ballard's parody of American politics, the pamphlet "Why I Want to Fuck Ronald Reagan", which was subsequently included as a chapter in his experimental novel The Atrocity Exhibition, was photocopied and distributed by pranksters at the 1980 Republican National Convention. In the early 1970s, Bill Butler, a bookseller in Brighton, was prosecuted under UK obscenity laws for selling the pamphlet.

In his 2002 book Straw Dogs: Thoughts on Humans and Other Animals, the philosopher John Gray acknowledges Ballard as a major influence on his ideas. The book's publisher quotes Ballard as saying, "Straw Dogs challenges all our assumptions about what it is to be human, and convincingly shows that most of them are delusions." Gray wrote a short essay, in the New Statesman, about a dinner he had with Ballard in which he stated, "Unlike many others, it wasn't his dystopian vision that gripped my imagination. For me his work was lyrical—an evocation of the beauty that can be gleaned from landscapes of desolation."

According to literary theorist Brian McHale, The Atrocity Exhibition is a "postmodernist text based on science fiction topoi".

Lee Killough directly cites Ballard's seminal Vermilion Sands short stories as the inspiration for her collection Aventine, also a backwater resort for celebrities and eccentrics where bizarre or frivolous novelty technology facilitates the expression of dark intents and drives. Terry Dowling's milieu of Twilight Beach is also influenced by the stories of Vermilion Sands and other Ballard works.

In Simulacra and Simulation, Jean Baudrillard hailed Crash as the "first great novel of the universe of simulation".

The 2024 Met Gala dress code was "The Garden of Time", inspired by Ballard's 1962 short story of the same name.

Ballard also had an interest in the relationship between various media. In the early 1970s, he was one of the trustees of the Institute for Research in Art and Technology.

=== In popular music ===
Ballard has had a notable influence on popular music, where his work has been used as a basis for lyrical imagery, particularly amongst British post-punk and industrial groups. Examples include albums such as Metamatic by John Foxx and The Atrocity Exhibition... Exhibit A by Exodus, The Burning World by Swans, various songs by Joy Division (most famously "Atrocity Exhibition" from Closer and "Disorder" from Unknown Pleasures), "High Rise" by Hawkwind, "Miss the Girl" by Siouxsie Sioux's second band The Creatures (based on Crash), "Down in the Park" by Gary Numan, "Chrome Injury" by The Church, "Drowned World/Substitute for Love" by Madonna, "Warm Leatherette" by The Normal and Atrocity Exhibition by Danny Brown. Songwriters Trevor Horn and Bruce Woolley credit Ballard's story "The Sound-Sweep" with inspiring The Buggles' hit "Video Killed the Radio Star", and the Buggles' second album included a song entitled "Vermillion Sands". The 1978 post-punk band Comsat Angels took their name from one of Ballard's short stories. An early instrumental track by British electronic music group The Human League "4JG" bears Ballard's initials as a homage to the author (intended as a response to "2HB" by Roxy Music).

The Welsh rock band Manic Street Preachers include a sample from an interview with Ballard in their song "Mausoleum". Additionally, the Manic Street Preachers song, "A Billion Balconies Facing the Sun", is taken from a line in the J. G. Ballard novel Cocaine Nights. The English band Klaxons named their debut album Myths of the Near Future after one of Ballard's short story collections. The band Empire of the Sun took their name from Ballard's novel. The American rock band The Sound of Animals Fighting took the name of the song "The Heraldic Beak of the Manufacturer's Medallion" from Crash. UK-based drum and bass producer Fortitude released an EP in 2016 called "Kline Coma Xero" named after characters in The Atrocity Exhibition. The song "Terminal Beach" by the American band Yacht is a tribute to his short story collection that goes by the same name. American indie musician and comic book artist Jeffrey Lewis mentions Ballard by name in his song "Cult Boyfriend", on the record A Turn in The Dream-Songs (2011), in reference to Ballard's cult following as an author.

== Awards and honours ==
- 1979: BSFA Award for Best Novel for The Unlimited Dream Company
- 1984: Guardian Fiction Prize for Empire of the Sun
- 1984: James Tait Black Memorial Prize for fiction for Empire of the Sun
- 1984: Empire of the Sun shortlisted for the Booker Prize for Fiction
- 1997: De Montfort University Honorary doctorate.
- 2001: Commonwealth Writers' Prize (Europe & South Asia region) for Super-Cannes
- 2008: Golden PEN Award
- 2009 Royal Holloway University of London Posthumous honorary doctorate

== Works ==
=== Novels ===
- The Wind from Nowhere (1961)
- The Drowned World (1962)
- The Burning World (1964; also The Drought, 1965)
- The Crystal World (1966)
- The Atrocity Exhibition (1970, first published as Love and Napalm: Export USA, 1972)
- Crash (1973)
- Concrete Island (1974)
- High-Rise (1975)
- The Unlimited Dream Company (1979)
- Hello America (1981)
- Empire of the Sun (1984)
- The Day of Creation (1987)
- Running Wild (1988)
- The Kindness of Women (1991)
- Rushing to Paradise (1994)
- Cocaine Nights (1996)
- Super-Cannes (2000)
- Millennium People (2003)
- Kingdom Come (2006)

=== Short story collections ===
- The Voices of Time and Other Stories (1962)
- Billennium (1962)
- Passport to Eternity (1963)
- The 4-Dimensional Nightmare (1963)
- The Terminal Beach (1964)
- The Impossible Man (1966)
- The Overloaded Man (1967)
- The Disaster Area (1967)
- The Day of Forever (1967)
- Vermilion Sands (1971)
- Chronopolis and Other Stories (1971)
- Low-Flying Aircraft and Other Stories (1976)
- The Best Science Fiction of J.G. Ballard (1977)
- The Best Short Stories of J.G. Ballard (1978)
- The Venus Hunters (1980)
- Myths of the Near Future (1982)
- The Voices of Time (1985)
- Memories of the Space Age (1988)
- War Fever (1990)
- The Complete Short Stories of J.G. Ballard (2001)
- The Complete Short Stories of J.G. Ballard: Volume 1 (2006)
- The Complete Short Stories of J.G. Ballard: Volume 2 (2006)
- The Complete Stories of J.G. Ballard (2009)

=== Non-fiction ===
- A User's Guide to the Millennium: Essays and Reviews (1996)
- Miracles of Life (autobiography; 2008)

=== Interviews ===
- Paris Review – J. G. Ballard (1984)
- Re/Search No. 8/9: J. G. Ballard (1985)
- J. G. Ballard: Quotes (2004)
- J. G. Ballard: Conversations (2005)
- Extreme Metaphors (interviews; 2012)

== Adaptations ==
=== Films ===
- When Dinosaurs Ruled the Earth (1970, Val Guest)
- Empire of the Sun (1987, Steven Spielberg)
- Crash (1996, David Cronenberg)
- The Atrocity Exhibition (1998, Jonathan Weiss)
- Low-Flying Aircraft (2002, Solveig Nordlund)
- High-Rise (2015, Ben Wheatley)

=== Television ===
- "Thirteen to Centaurus" (1965) from the short story of the same name – dir. Peter Potter (BBC Two)
- Crash! (1971) dir. Harley Cokliss
- "Minus One" (1991) from the story of the same name – short film dir. by Simon Brooks.
- "Home" (2003) primarily based on "The Enormous Space" – dir. Richard Curson Smith (BBC Four)
- "The Drowned Giant" (2021) from the short story of the same name, is the eighth episode of the second season of the Netflix anthology series Love, Death & Robots

=== Radio ===
- In Nov/Dec 1988, CBC Radio's sci-fi series Vanishing Point ran a seven-episode miniseries of The Stories of J. G. Ballard, which included audio adaptations of "Escapement," "Dead Astronaut," "The Cloud Sculptors of Coral D," "Low Flying Aircraft," "A Question of Re-entry," "News from the Sun" and "Having a Wonderful Time".
- In June 2013, BBC Radio 4 broadcast adaptions of The Drowned World and Concrete Island as part of a season of dystopian fiction entitled Dangerous Visions.
