= Brixia Model 1913 =

Italian navy pistol 1913-1945

Brixia Model 1913 Pistola automatica mod. 1913 tipo "Regia Marina"
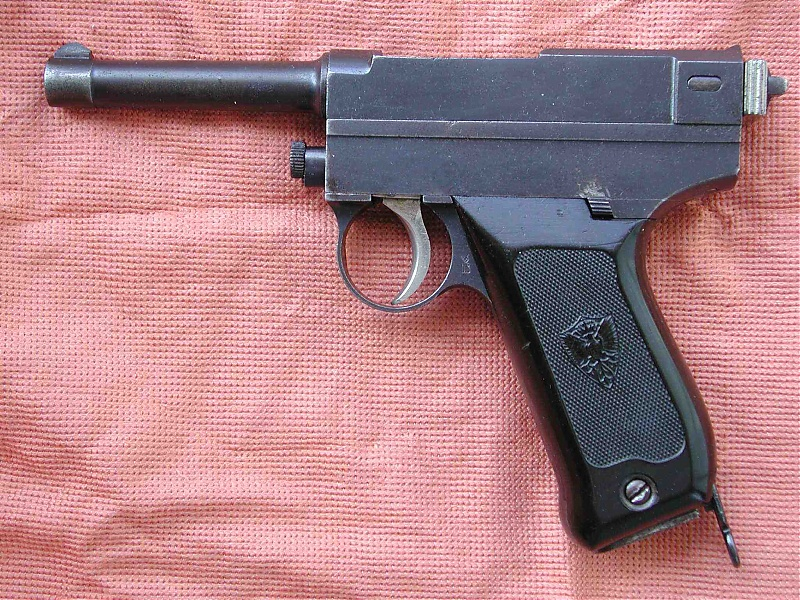
- The left side of a Brixia Model 1913
- Type: Semi-automatic pistol
- Place of origin: Kingdom of Italy

Service history
- In service: 1913-1945
- Used by: Royal Italian Army
- Wars: World War I World War II

Production history
- Designer: Bethel Abiel Revelli
- Designed: 1912
- Manufacturer: Metallurgica Bresciana già Tempini (MBT)
- Developed from: Glisenti M1910
- Produced: 1913-1914
- No. built: ~5,000

Specifications
- Mass: 950 g (2 lb 2 oz) Unloaded
- Length: 211mm

The Brixia Model 1913, was a service pistol of the Regia Marina used from World War I to World War II. Its official designation was Pistola automatica modello 1913 tipo "Regia Marina" It was based on the Glisenti Mod. 1910.

== History ==
The Glisenti M1910 first saw service in the Italo-Turkish War. During the conflict, the Regia Marina discovered certain deficiencies in its design. MBT (Metallurgica Bresciana già Tempini) chose to create an improved and simplified version of the Glisenti. The pistol was officially adopted as the Pistola automatica modello 1913, and came to be known as the Brixia Mod. 1913, the Latin name of the city of Brescia. It is also referred to as the Brixia Mod. 1912 from the year it was designed.

The first 2,500 pistols were delivered in late 1913, while the second batch of 2,500 arrived in early 1914. It is estimated that 200-300 Brixias were sold commercially as well.

The pistol was used by the Regia Marina alongside the Mauser C96 (designated in Italian as Pistola automatica modello 1899) for the duration of WWI. In the Interwar period, it began to be replaced by various Beretta models. Though like the Glisenti, its usage would continue into WWII.

=== Brixia Model 1920 ===
In 1920, MBT produced a long-barreled version of the Brxia Model 1913. With a barrel extended to 175mm and an adjustable rear sight derived from the C96. Its grip included a cutout to accommodate a shoulder stock. The Model 1920 would not enter full production after being prototyped, with its highest known serial number being in the single digits.

== Technical features ==
In function and disassembly, it is identical to the Glisenti Mod. 1910, designed by Abiel Bethel Revelli. Its modifications included a strengthening of the frame, simplifications during manufacturing, and improvements to the safety mechanism.

The slide, chamber and receiver were thickened, rendering the Brixia slightly heavier. the exterior protrusions and recesses found on the Glisenti were smoothed out. The grips were made of ebonite, and feature a Savoyard crest. Unlike the Glisenti, they were secured by a screw instead of being snap-fit. The key and screwdriver previously used to disassemble the Glisenti are omitted.

Most improvements were made internally rather than externally. The rotating block was changed to rotate freely within the frame's milled housing. The "butterfly" style safety of the Glisenti was maintained, while the grip safety was omitted. Instead, the Brixia would not fire unless the magazine was inserted. The mechanism facilitating this feature is a fixed lever attached to the slide which blocks the trigger until a magazine is inserted.

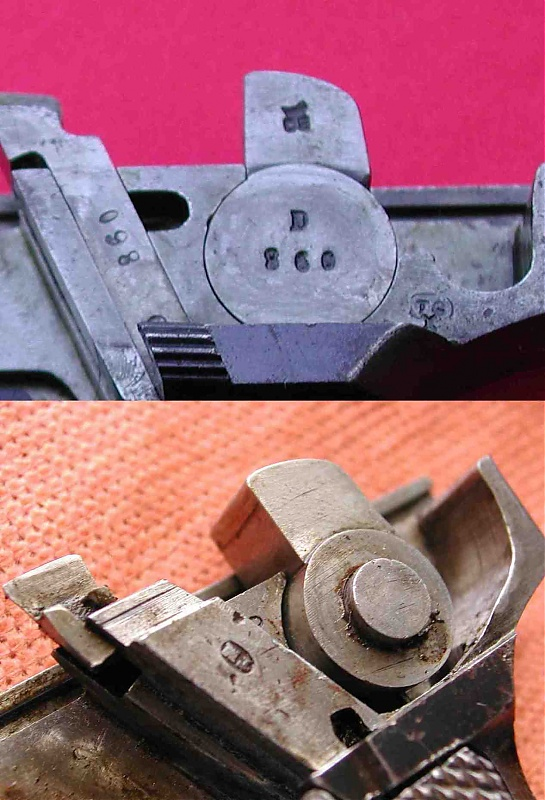
Above: The modified action of the Brixia, Below: The Glisenti's

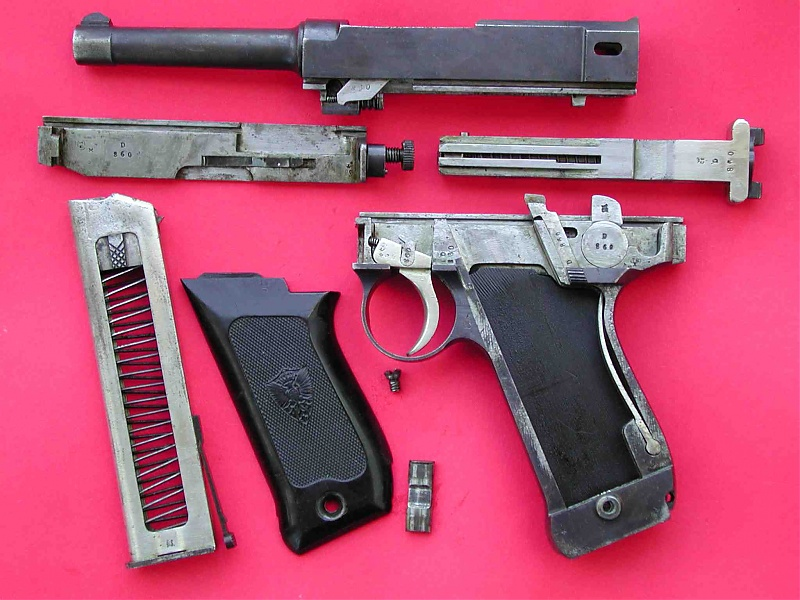
The Brixia disassembled

== See also ==
- 9mm Glisenti
- Glisenti Mod. 1910
- Beretta Mod. 17
- Ruby pistol
