= Chronopolis =

Chronopolis may refer to:

- Chronopolis, a 1974 novel by Barrington J. Bayley, also known as The Fall of Chronopolis
- "Chronopolis" (short story), a 1960 short story by J. G. Ballard, first published in New Worlds, June 1960
- Chronopolis and Other Stories, a 1971 collection of stories by J. G. Ballard, also published as Chronopolis
- Chronopolis (film), a 1982 animated feature film by Piotr Kamler
- Chronopolis (Marvel Comics), a fictional city in the Marvel Comics universe, ruled by Kang the Conqueror
- Chronopolis, a fictional city in the Chrono Cross universe
- Chronopolis, a fictional city in the DC Comics universe, home to a version of Chronos
- Chronopolis, a grid-based digital preservation environment based at the San Diego Supercomputer Center
