= The Concentration City =

Short story by J. G. Ballard

Frontispiece for the story's first publication in New Worlds

"The Concentration City" is a dystopian short story by British author J. G. Ballard, first published (as "Build-Up") in the January 1957 issue of New Worlds.

Ballard retitled the story for its inclusion in the 1967 collection The Disaster Area; it has been republished in Billennium and Chronopolis, and appears in volume one of The Complete Short Stories of J. G. Ballard.

== Plot ==
The story is set in the City, a densely-inhabited ecumenopolis that comprises the entire universe of its inhabitants (essentially, an arcology with no outside.) In terms of infrastructure and culture, the City resembles a large American metropolis of the 1950s, with period-typical dwellings, businesses, streets, and transit - but extended indefinitely in all directions, including vertically, where the urban landscape is embedded in a three-dimensional matrix of eighty-foot-tall Levels.

Franz M., a twenty-year-old physics student, has become obsessed with what he privately refers to "free space" - the concept that the City must have an edge, beyond which there is some sort of void (a concept which his best friend Gregson has a difficult time even visualizing.) "Free space" is at any rate an oxymoronic concept in the City, where habitable volume is conceived of strictly as a commodity; the story is punctuated by a steady tick of cubic-foot price quotes, which serve as a signifier of a given area's economic status. Nonetheless, Franz keeps having recurring dreams of flight or levitation in such a void; he experiments with crude gliders propelled by fireworks, though he finds himself handicapped by the relative underdevelopment of the theory of aerodynamics, a purely theoretical field with no practical applications. He eventually concludes that this approach is a dead end, as the City contains no empty space large enough to trial a device large enough to carry a human (aside from restricted-access construction zones.) Instead, he resolves to physically investigate the question, by traveling for as long as possible in a single direction; to this end, he boards a westbound Supersleeper, a long-distance rail service whose rocket-propelled trains travel through evacuated tubes at velocities approaching 1% of the speed of light.

Supersleepers are intended for trips of less than a day, but (in something of a loophole) fares are only collected upon a traveler's disembarkation, allowing voyages of theoretically-indefinite length. Franz departs his native KNI County, located in the 493rd Sector of the 298th Local Union (with eleven trillion inhabitants), and travels westward through increasingly grandiose political formations, culminating in a "755th Greater Metropolitan Empire" (the implied total population of the sections of the City mentioned being approximately 10^{27} people.) On his tenth day in transit, Franz suddenly notices that his Supersleeper's direction is now listed as "eastbound", despite the train never having reversed course. His incredulous reaction attracts the attention of railway staff, who cancel his ticket and return him to his point of origin. Detained under a vagrancy charge in a police station in his home neighborhood, Franz is interrogated by a sympathetic physician, who tells him he will have him released, but advises him to try and forget his obsession. Still dazed, Franz glances at a wall calendar and discovers that time has also reversed: it is the day of his initial departure on the Supersleeper, three weeks earlier. The story's final line is:

You're back where you first started from. $ HELL × 10.

...The concluding fragment being the formula for calculating the real-estate valuation of habitable space repeatedly used as a scene break throughout the story; later printings add an exponent variable ("$ HELL × 10^{n}"), which had been mistakenly omitted from the original New Worlds version, and delete the penultimate sentence.

== Setting ==
During his voyage, Franz notes that he has in five days traversed around 950 million kilometers; given the exotic topology of the City, this is necessarily also the lower bound for one quarter of its minimum circumference, and is equivalent to about .0001 light year. The City's minimum volume (as a 4-dimensional hypersphere with no outer surface) can be no less than 8.3 × 10^{48} km^{3}; applying the ratio of volume to population specified for KNI County (416,818 km^{3} and 30 million) to the City gives a minimum population of approximately 6 × 10^{50} people. This unimaginably vast population is - to all appearances - stable; there is no suggestion of Malthusian pressure, and the standard of living depicted is adequate and relatively uniform (though there are slums, and - more seriously - "dead zones", areas walled off from the rest of the City, where services are disconnected and urban decay is allowed to run rampant.) The conventional status marker of a City neighborhood is the cost of habitable space, which is priced in cubic (as opposed to square) feet; the formula for calculating the value of cubic space reoccurs frequently in the story, with anything above a dollar per cubic foot considered a "respectable" valuation. The main source of anxiety in such middle-class areas is deliberate arson by pyromaniacs; it is not made clear whether this is a common occurrence, but "pyros" are universally considered a grave threat to civilization, monoxide detectors are ubiquitous, and - due to restrictions on heat sources - food is only served cold. Suspected pyros are regularly lynched by mobs in plain sight of the City authorities, though Ballard implies this is often a pretext for liquidating social undesirables.

Aside from humans, the City's environment is almost entirely artificial, with a few scattered remnants of nature preserved in small gardens and zoos (the protagonist's home County of thirty million can boast a single tree.) The City's inhabitants are mostly concerned with the mundane business of day-to-day existence; despite the obvious artificiality of their surroundings, philosophical speculation regarding the exact nature the City is rare, and regarded as a sign of immaturity and eccentricity. Two ontological concepts are however common among the population: the first is a belief in a vague, semi-legendary "Foundation," during which the first stone of the City had been laid down (an event said to have occurred some three hundred billion years ago, though Ballard revised the figure to three million years in reprints.) The second is a belief in a "Wall," a hypothetical limit to the city (though adherents are at a loss as to what might exist beyond it.) Both beliefs are viewed with condescension by the better-educated, who hold that the City is infinite and has always existed. Only one independent data point regarding the City's true age is presented: animals in its zoos have been there long enough to be shaped by evolutionary processes, with the City's birds having not only become flightless, but having lost their pectoral girdles, the attachment point for wings.

== Relationship with other works ==
Urban dystopias and overpopulation were some of Ballard's most frequently-revisited themes, most famously in 1962's "Billennium." Ballard was both influenced by earlier speculative fiction and went on to influence subsequent work in the genre, in which several distinct types of "infinite cities" appear:

- The Machine - a worldwide telepresence-based subterranean civilization in the 1909 science fiction short story "The Machine Stops" by E. M. Forster
- The Library of Babel - a near-infinite three-dimensional structure containing every possible unique book in Jorge Luis Borges' story of the same name (1941)
- Trantor - a planet-spanning city from Isaac Asimov's Foundation novels (1942)
- Diaspar - a sealed, self-contained city-state that endures for a billion years in Arthur C. Clarke's The City and the Stars (1951)
- Coruscant - a similar planet-wide city in the Star Wars saga
- New York - a vastly-overpopulated near-future version of the city in Harry Harrison's 1966 science fiction novel Make Room! Make Room!, and its screen adaptation Soylent Green
- The Urbmons - a worldwide civilization of enormous city-towers in Robert Silverberg's 1971 novel The World Inside
- The City - a finite-but-unbounded megastructure larger than the Solar System in Tsutomo Nihei's manga Blame! (1997)
- "Quest" by Lee Harding - a 1963 short story where a man in an endless city likewise departs on a futile search: for something not man-made.
