= Beretta Model 1915 =

Italian semi-automatic pistol

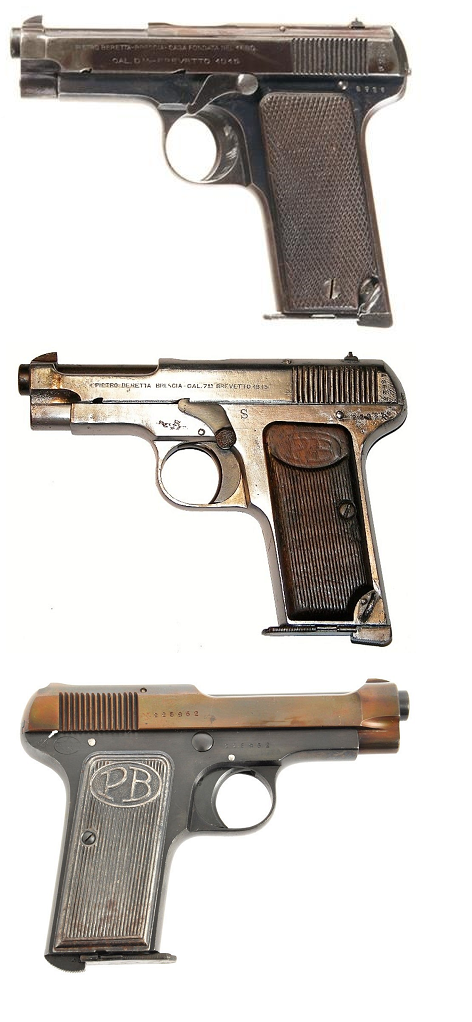
- From top to bottom : M1915, M1915/17, M1915/19
- Type: Semi-automatic pistol
- Place of origin: Italy

Service history
- In service: 1915-1945
- Used by: Royal Italian Army
- Wars: World War I World War II

Production history
- Designer: Tullio Marengoni
- Manufacturer: Fabrica d'Armi Pietro Beretta S.p.A.
- Produced: 1915-1930
- No. built: 15,670 (M1915); 56,000 (M1915/17)
- Variants: M1915; M1915/17; M1915/19

Specifications
- Cartridge: 9mm Glisenti; 7.65x17mm Browning SR
- Action: Blowback/single action
- Muzzle velocity: 280 m/s
- Effective firing range: 55 metres (60 yd)
- Feed system: M1915: 7-rounds box magazine M1915/17: 8-rounds box magazine M1915/19: 8-rounds box magazine

The Beretta Model 1915 or Beretta M1915 is a semi-automatic pistol manufactured by Beretta, designed by Tullio Marengoni who was the chief engineer in the company, to replace the Glisenti Model 1910 which had a complex and weak firing mechanism. It is the first semi-automatic pistol, manufactured by the company, and issued as a service pistol in Royal Italian Army during World War I. The total production of the Beretta M1915 is estimated about 15,600 during 1915-1918, and about 56,000 of Beretta M1915/1917. Some of the pistols were also used in World War II until 1945. Its open slide design later became the characteristic for other Beretta pistols such as Beretta M1923, Beretta M1934, Beretta M1935, Beretta M1951, Beretta 70, Beretta 92, Beretta Cheetah, and Beretta M9.

== History ==
The Glisenti Model 1910 used a bottlenecked 7.65 mm round which was similar to the 7.65×21mm Parabellum. Later, having the Italian Army judged the 7.65 round to be too light for military use, and having launched a competition for 9mm handguns instead, the Metallurgica Bresciana Tampini, owner of the design, adapted the Glisenti pistol to fire a 9mm round, obtained enlarging the original one (eliminating the bottleneck) without changing the load. Therefore, although being the cartridge dimensionally identical to the 9mm Luger (that was obtained in the same way from the 7.65×21mm Parabellum, but increasing the load) the 9mm Glisenti cartridge has a load that is about 1/4 lighter than the original military load of the 9mm Luger. When Italy entered World War I, the need for more military pistols increased dramatically. The chief designer Tullio Marengoni completed his design of a simple blowback action pistol that could fire the same 9mm Glisenti cartridge, was patented by the Pietro Beretta Arms Factory on June 29, 1915, and was immediately adopted by the Royal Army, just over a month involved in the Great War. It replaced the previous ordinances, the revolvers Chamelot Delvigne 1874 and Bodeo Model 1889 and above all the automatic Glisenti Model 1910 and Brixia Mod. 1913, not fully satisfactory. A .32 ACP version, the Beretta M1917, was also produced and was adopted by the Italian Royal Navy. Finally, it was replaced by later model Beretta M1934.

== Features ==
In the 9mm Glisenti model, the barrel is exposed by an open slide - the signature design for later Beretta pistols but unlike later Beretta pistols, the front sight is fitted along the front end of the barrel as that part of the slide is cut open. The ejection port along with the extractor is at the top of the slide that ejects the bullet casing upwards. Since the pistol does not have locking mechanism, the slide closes by itself when the empty magazine taken out. It has two slide notches, the forward one allows to disassembly, while other to place the side safety. One of the unusual features of the pistol is that it has two manual safety features - one is on the left side of the frame that blocks the trigger while the other one is on the rear side of the frame that prevents the hammer to operate.

== Variants ==
=== M1915/17 ===
The gun is smaller and lighter than the M1915. The straight handle, inclined only 9 ° with respect to the barrel, has vertically scored grip panels instead of knurled ones. The trigger guard is round instead of ovular. The grip safety has been removed. The frame mounted safety one on the left side is present as well as acting as a safe blocking the trigger, it also works as a dismounting pin and hold open lever . Also missing are the shock absorber spring and the ejector, which is replaced in its function by the striker. The magazine contains 8 rounds instead of 7. The war production ended in 1921, while the civil one continued for a long time. Finally, in the 1940s a batch of 1,500 pistols was sent to the Finnish Army.

=== M1915/19 ===
The improved version of M1915/17, which chambers 7.65mm Browning cartridge same as the M1915/17 pistol. The round post barrel mount where the barrel was lifted straight up out of the frame was replaced with a T slot mount. This required a larger opening in the top of the slide so the double opening of the M1915 was changed to a single longer one. The slide now looked like the characteristic open-top Beretta style.

== Users ==
- Finland - 1,500 M1915/17s brought from Italy in 1940.
- Italy (used by the Italian Royal Army, Italian Royal Air Force, Italian Royal Navy and Italian Royal Police.)
- Albania
