= Beretta M1923 =

Beretta Model 1923
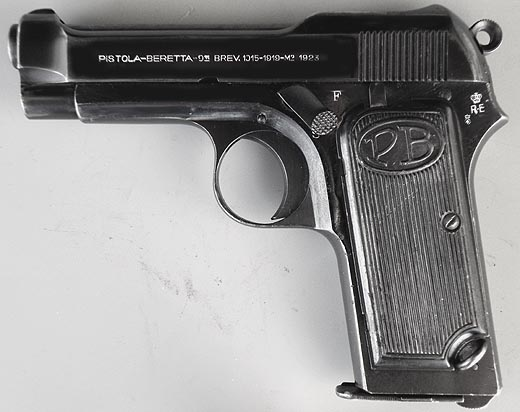
- Left side view of the Beretta M1923
- Type: Semi-automatic pistol
- Place of origin: Italy

Service history
- In service: 1923–1945
- Used by: See Users
- Wars: World War II

Production history
- Designer: Giovanni Beretta
- Manufacturer: Fabrica d'Armi Pietro Beretta S.p.A.

Specifications
- Mass: 800 grams (1.8 lb)
- Length: 177 millimetres (7.0 in)
- Barrel length: 87 millimetres (3.4 in)
- Cartridge: 9mm Glisenti
- Action: Blowback, single-action
- Muzzle velocity: 305 m/s (1,000.6 fps)
- Effective firing range: 50 metres (55 yd)

The Beretta Model 1923 pistol was a service pistol used by the Italian Army from 1923 until 1945. The M1923 was designed to consolidate the improvements of the 1915/19 model and to use the 9mm Glisenti round. However, due to the vast amount of handguns available after the end of World War I only 3000 samples, of about 10.000 produced, were purchased by the Italian Army.

== History ==
The Glisenti Model 1910 was the first Italian produced semi auto pistol adopted by the Italian military. Designed by Bethel Revelli it was originally chambered for a bottlenecked 7.65 mm round, which was similar to the 7.65×21mm Parabellum. Later, having the Italian Army judged the 7.65 round to be too light for military use, and having launched a competition for 9mm handguns instead, the Metallurgica Bresciana Tampini, owner of the design, adapted the Glisenti pistol to fire a 9mm round, obtained enlarging the original one (eliminating the bottleneck) without changing the load. Therefore, although being the cartridge dimensionally identical to the 9mm Luger (that was obtained in the same way from the 7.65×21mm Parabellum, but increasing the load) the 9mm Glisenti cartridge has a load that is about 1/4 lighter than the original military load of the 9mm Luger. The Glisenti Model 1910 suffered however from a lack of robustness due to its weak frame design. The bolt assembly in the receiver is supported only on one side. This lack of structural integrity led all of the stresses of firing to be taken up by just one side rail.

When Italy entered World War I, the need for more military pistols increased dramatically. In 1915, Tullio Marengoni from Beretta completed his design of a simple blowback action pistol that could fire the same 9mm Glisenti cartridge. This pistol was adopted by the Italian Army as the Beretta M1915. The M1915 is unusual in the fact that it used two manual safeties. One is a slide stop safety on the left side of the frame. The other is a small lever on the rear of the frame. If either safety is set, the pistol will not fire. Also manufactured by Beretta and adopted by the Italian military was a scaled-down version of this pistol in 7.65mm. In addition to being smaller, it did not have the manual safety at the rear of the frame.

In 1919 improvements were made to the smaller 7.65mm M1915 design. The round post barrel mount where the barrel was lifted straight up out of the frame was replaced with a T slot mount. This required a larger opening in the top of the slide so the double opening of the M1915 was changed to a single longer one. The slide now looked like the characteristic open-top Beretta style. The redesigned pistol is marked on the slide 1915–1919, otherwise known as the M1915/19.

In 1921 Beretta introduced a pistol in 9mm Glisenti caliber as a replacement for the military's M1915 pistols. It incorporated the M1915/1919 changes plus adding an external hammer. The M1923 is a semi-automatic pistol with a 4-inch (100 mm) barrel and 7 shot detachable magazine. The slide is marked "Brev 1915-1919 Mlo 1923". Some of the M1923 pistols have grooves for a shoulder stock holster machined into the bottom of the grip frame. The shoulder stock holster was unlike the Mauser in that it was a conventional leather holster with a hinged folding steel arm riveted to the spine. The end of the arm had a cut out that slipped over the butt of the pistol and locked in place.

== Users ==
- Argentina: Purchased 600 for the Buenos Aires Provincial Police from 1933 to 1934.
- Kingdom of Bulgaria: Purchased 4,000 in 1926.
- Kingdom of Italy: Service pistol prior to the adoption of the Beretta M1934.
- Turkey: Purchased 25 for the Turkish Navy in 1931.
