= Billennium =

Billennium may refer to:

- 2nd millennium, the second period of one thousand years in the Common Era
- 3rd millennium, the period of time which began with the year 2001
- Beretta 92 Billennium, a type of pistol
- Unix billennium, a point in Unix time which occurred in 2001
- "Billennium" (short story), a short story by J. G. Ballard

== See also ==
- Biennial (disambiguation)
