= Billennium (short story) =

Short story by J. G. Ballard

Billenium (or Billennium) is a short story by British author J. G. Ballard, first published in the November 1961 issue of New Worlds and in the 1962 collection Billennium. It later appeared in The Terminal Beach (1964), Chronopolis and Other Stories (1971), and The Complete Short Stories of J. G. Ballard: Volume 1 (2006). With a dystopian ambience, "Billennium" explores themes similar to Ballard's earlier story "The Concentration City", of space shortages and over-crowding.

== Setting ==
The story is set in the future (possibly c. 21st century – see billennium) where the world is becoming increasingly overpopulated, with a population of around 20 billion. Most of its inhabitants live in crowded central cities in order to preserve as much outside land as possible for farming, and as a result the world does not have a food problem, nor wars – since all governments devote themselves to addressing the problems caused by overpopulation. In the city inhabited by the two protagonists, John Ward and Henry Rossiter, there is a mass shortage of space and the people live in small cellular rooms where they are charged by ceiling space, the legal maximum decreasing to 3.5 square metres (38 sq ft) per person. The city streets are enormously crowded, resulting in occasional pedestrian congestions that last days at a time. Most old and historical buildings have been taken down to make way for new battery homes or divided into hundreds of small cubicles.

== Plot ==
Ward lives in a future dystopian society with his close friend, Rossiter. After being kicked out of their homes, they decide to move in together so that they have space and split the payments. The story revolves around Ward and Rossiter's combined discovery of a secret, larger-than-average room adjacent to their rented cubicle. This is mildly important, as they have never been in a room where there were no people. As the two bask in the extra personal space that they have never known, things become complicated when they allow two other close friends to share the space, and the ensuing snowball effect of their invitees bringing family to live in the room. In the end, the "luxurious" space comes to be the same type of crowded cubicle that they were trying to escape from in the first place. Ward becomes the landlord when there are so many people. He has always hated landlords and thinks that they are greedy and rude. He slowly starts to become what he always hated.

== See also ==
- Make Room! Make Room!
- Stand on Zanzibar
- The World Inside
- Get 'Em Out by Friday
