= Mr F. Is Mr F. =

1961 short story by J. G. Ballard

"Mr F. Is Mr F." is a short story by British author J. G. Ballard. It first appeared in the August 1961 edition of Science Fantasy (Volume 16, Number 48). It was later reprinted in The Disaster Area (1967), and then in the larger The Complete Short Stories of J. G. Ballard: Volume 1 anthology (2006).

== Plot summary ==
"Mr F. Is Mr F." is a bizarre tale concerning Charles Freeman, who, after discovering the fact while checking his health, is undergoing a strange metamorphosis, rapidly de-aging into the body of an increasingly younger child. As he gets younger he starts feeling more and more confident about himself. Although he first believes the condition is some psychosomatic illness, and initially hides his transforming body from his wife, he soon discovers she knows full well about his predicament, denying him escape from the house. It is strongly implied his wife understands it or is responsible for it (after the realisation that his wife's expected baby is in fact him), however it is never truly revealed what the origin of the condition is, so Freeman continues to get younger, becoming more childlike and tired in the process. After a while Freeman reaches the point where he looks like a toddler and eventually disappears into his wife's womb and his life ends at his conception.
