= Minus One (short story) =

Short story by J. G. Ballard

"Minus One" is a short story by British author J. G. Ballard; it was first published in the June 1963 edition of Science Fantasy (Volume 20, Number 59). It was later reprinted in the 1967 collection The Disaster Area, and then later in the larger The Complete Short Stories of J. G. Ballard: Volume 1 anthology (2006).

== Plot summary ==
"Minus One" is set in Green Hill Asylum, whose motto is "There is a Green Hill Far, Far Away". It provides a private prison where the rich can incarcerate "miscreant or unfortunate relatives whose presence would otherwise be a burden or embarrassment". Security rather than treatment comes first and the asylum boasted that no-one had ever escaped, that is until the disappearance of a patient called Hinton. Thorough searches are conducted and staff questioned but no trace of him can be found. Dr. Mellinger, the director of the asylum leads the investigation and it transpires that nobody can remember much about him at all. Dr Mellinger realises that the patients are not being treated as individuals and decides that from then on the regime of Green Hill will change to take more interest in the individual. Still the disappearance of Hinton remains unexplained; Dr. Mellinger looks at Hinton's file and realises that it is the only evidence of him ever having existed. Fortuitously the file is then "lost" and the director announces that the disappearance was an administrative error and that Hinton had never really existed. All are happy until a visitor arrives at the hospital to see her husband. It is Mrs Hinton. As she is obviously suffering from delusions in need of treatment she is forcibly admitted as the story ends on the phrase "minus two".

== Film adaptation ==
In 1991 it was made into a short film by Simon Brooks, first shown at the Viareggio Film Festival.
