= The Disaster Area =

- Dust-jacket from the first edition
- Author: J. G. Ballard
- Cover artist: Leigh Taylor
- Language: English
- Genre: Science fiction
- Publisher: Jonathan Cape
- Publication date: 1967
- Publication place: United Kingdom
- Media type: Print (hardback)
- Pages: 206
- ISBN: 9780586028148

The Disaster Area is a collection of science fiction short stories by British author J. G. Ballard.

== Contents ==
- "Storm-bird, Storm-dreamer"
- "The Concentration City"
- "The Subliminal Man"
- "Now Wakes the Sea"
- "Minus One"
- "Mr F. is Mr F."
- "Zone of Terror"
- "Manhole 69"
- "The Impossible Man"

== Sources ==
- Tuck, Donald H. (1974). The Encyclopedia of Science Fiction and Fantasy. Chicago: Advent. p. 1. ISBN 0-911682-20-1.
