= 9mm Glisenti =

Pistol cartridge

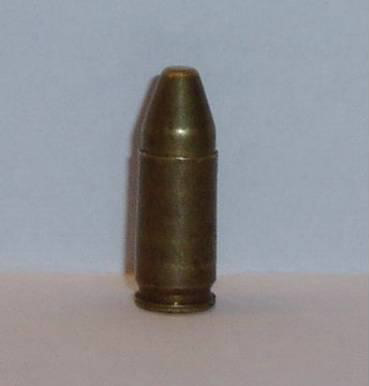
- Type: Pistol
- Place of origin: Kingdom of Italy

Specifications
- Parent case: 9×19mm Parabellum
- Case type: Rimless, tapered
- Bullet diameter: 9.02 mm (0.355 in)
- Neck diameter: 9.65 mm (0.380 in)
- Base diameter: 9.96 mm (0.392 in)
- Rim diameter: 9.98 mm (0.393 in)
- Case length: 19.15 mm (0.754 in)
- Overall length: 29.21 mm (1.150 in)

Ballistic performance
Bullet mass/type	Velocity	Energy
8.00 g (123 gr) FMJ	320 m/s (1,000 ft/s)	410 J (300 ft⋅lbf)

The 9mm Glisenti (9×19mm) is an Italian pistol and submachine gun cartridge.

== History and usage ==
The 9mm Glisenti was developed for the Italian Glisenti Model 1910 pistol, first used in World War I. It was also used in other Italian weapons such as the Beretta Model 1915 and Beretta M1923 pistols.

All weapons of the Villar Perosa family, including the O.V.P. submachine gun and Revelli-Beretta carbine, were originally intended to fire a variant of the 9mm Glisenti cartridge, known as Glisenti M.915 "Per Mitragliatrici" ('For Machine-Guns'). This was a higher-velocity version of the standard Glisenti cartridge with an over-powder wad, designed to improve the penetration abilities of the weak base cartridge.

The Medusa M47 revolver can also fire 9mm Glisenti ammunition along with many other .38 and 9 mm cartridges.

== Specifications ==
The cartridge was based on the German 9×19mm Parabellum; in fact, both cartridges are dimensionally identical. However, the powder charge of the 9mm Glisenti cartridge is reduced compared to a typical 9×19mm cartridge, making it significantly less powerful, as it is also meant to be used in blowback pistols, which are easier and less expensive to manufacture than locked breech firearms. This means that 9mm Glisenti cartridges will chamber and fire in 9×19mm firearms, at the risk of not cycling properly and causing malfunctions, but it also means that 9×19mm cartridges will chamber and fire in 9mm Glisenti, presenting a significant risk of catastrophic failure to the firearm, and a risk of injury to the shooter.

The cartridge is now obsolete, but Fiocchi Munizioni occasionally produces batches.
