= Chronopolis and Other Stories =

1971 collection of stories by J. G. Ballard

- Cover of the first edition
- Author: J. G. Ballard
- Cover artist: Nicole De Jurenev
- Language: English
- Genre: Science fiction
- Publisher: Putnam Publishing
- Publication date: 1971
- Publication place: United States
- Media type: Print (hardback & paperback)
- Pages: 319
- ISBN: 978-0-399-10141-0
- OCLC: 161039

Chronopolis and Other Stories is a 1971 collection of science fiction stories by British writer J. G. Ballard. Originally published in the United States by Putnam, it was reprinted in paperback in 1972 by Berkley Books, under the title Chronopolis, subtitled "The Science Fiction of J. G. Ballard."

== Contents ==
- "The Voices of Time" (New Worlds 1960)
- "The Drowned Giant" (The Terminal Beach 1964)
- "The Terminal Beach" (New Worlds 1964)
- "Manhole 69" (New Worlds 1957)
- "Storm-Bird, Storm-Dreamer" (The Impossible Man 1966)
- "The Sound-Sweep" (Science-Fantasy 1960)
- "Billennium" (New Worlds 1961)
- "Chronopolis" (New Worlds 1960)
- "Build-Up" (New Worlds 1957)
- "The Garden of Time" F&SF 1962)
- "End-Game" (New Worlds 1963)
- "The Watch-Towers" (Science-Fantasy 1962)
- "Now Wakes the Sea" (F&SF 1963)
- "Zone of Terror" (New Worlds 1960)
- "The Cage of Sand" (New Worlds 1962)
- "Deep End" (New Worlds 1961)

== Reception ==
Theodore Sturgeon praised the collection, saying "I know Ballard has made waves; I know he will not stop; I am most pleased to watch where he is going.
