= The World Inside =

1971 science fiction novel

- Cover of first edition (hardcover).
- Author: Robert Silverberg
- Cover artist: James Starrett
- Language: English
- Genre: Science fiction
- Publisher: Doubleday
- Publication date: 1971
- Publication place: United States
- Media type: Print (hardback & paperback)
- Pages: 201
- ISBN: 0-385-03621-3
- OCLC: 148344

The World Inside is a science fiction novel by American writer Robert Silverberg, published in 1971. The novel originally appeared as a series of shorter works in 1970 and 1971, all but one published in Galaxy, including the Hugo nominated novella "The World Outside". The World Inside was nominated for a Hugo Award in 1972, although Silverberg declined the nomination.

On March 2, 2010, Orb Books published this title as a trade paperback edition.

== Plot introduction ==
The novel is set on Earth in the year 2381, when the population of the planet has reached 75 billion people. Population growth has skyrocketed due to a quasi-religious belief in human reproduction as the highest possible good. Most of the action occurs in a massive three-kilometer-high city tower called Urban Monad 116.

== Plot summary ==
War, starvation, crime and birth control have been eliminated. Life is now totally fulfilled and sustained within Urban Monads (Urbmons), mammoth thousand-floor skyscrapers arranged in "constellations", where the shadow of one building does not fall upon another. An Urbmon is divided into 25 self-contained "cities" of 40 floors each, in ascending order of status, with administrators occupying the highest level. Each building can hold approximately 800,000 people, with excess population totalling three billion a year transferred to new Urbmons, which are continually under construction.

The Urbmon population is supported by the conversion of all of the Earth's habitable land area not taken up by Urbmons to agriculture. The theoretical limit of the population supported by this arrangement is estimated to be 200 billion. The farmers live a very different lifestyle, with strict birth control. Farmers trade their produce for technology and the two societies rarely have direct contact; even their languages are mutually unintelligible.

The Urbmons are a world of total sexual license where men are expected to engage in "nightwalking"; it is considered very rude to refuse an invitation for sex. In this world it is a blessing to have children: most people are married at 12 and parents at 14. Just thinking of controlling families is considered a faux pas. Privacy has been dispensed with due to the limited area. Because the need to be outdoors and to travel has been eliminated, thoughts of wanderlust are considered perverse.

The dwellers of the Urban Monad share scant resources and believe that sharing of everything is required in order for people to peacefully coexist in close quarters. The sharing extends to wives and husbands.

Although great effort is spent to maintain a stable society, the Urban Monad lifestyle causes mental illness in a small percentage of people, and this fate befalls two of the book's main characters. "Moral engineers" reprogram those who are approaching an unacceptable level of behavior.

Given the extremes of life in the Urban Monads, law enforcement and the concept of justice employ a zero tolerance policy. There are usually no trials, and punishment is swift; anyone who threatens the stability of the Urbmon society (a "flippo") is "erased" by being thrown into a shaft that terminates in the building's power generator. This gives one of the book's characters the idea that humanity has been selectively bred for life within the Urbmons.

== Characters ==
- Aurea Holston, who does not wish to leave the Monad when reassigned
- Siegmund Kluver, specialized in theory of urban administration, consultant to the administration of the building
- Micael Statler, a computer engineer who uses his position to facilitate his desire to explore the outside
- Jason Quevedo, historian, scholar who researches the society archives to recreate previous eras

== See also ==
- Judge Dredd – comic involving comparable harshness in urban criminal enforcement
- Make Room! Make Room!
- Stand on Zanzibar
- "Billennium"
- The Time Machine – 1895 science fiction novella by H. G. Wells involving a selectively bred city population
