= The Terminal Beach =

1964 science fiction short story collection by J.G. Ballard

- Cover of the first edition.
- Author: J. G. Ballard
- Language: English
- Genre: Science fiction
- Publisher: Victor Gollancz Ltd
- Publication date: 1964
- Publication place: United Kingdom
- Media type: Print (hardback)
- Pages: 221 pp
- ISBN: 1-85799-021-8
- OCLC: 31816321
- LC Class: PR6052.A46 T47 1993

The Terminal Beach is a collection of science fiction short stories by British author J. G. Ballard, published in 1964.

An American collection of the same year reused the title for a significantly-different selection, with the only overlapping stories being "End-Game" and "The Terminal Beach".

== Contents ==
=== British edition ===
- "The Terminal Beach": A man who does not come to terms with the premature death of his wife and son steals away onto an island of Eniwetok, once used for testing nuclear weapons. Between the decaying buildings on the island, the reader follows his mental and physical decline.
- "A Question of Re-entry": This story has some parallels to Joseph Conrad's Heart of Darkness, with the protagonist traveling upriver in the Amazon rain forest, to meet a European who went native. The story evolves around the clash between civilization-based knowledge and native belief.
- "The Drowned Giant": A giant human(oid) body washes ashore. The initial wonder soon gives way to banality as people start to climb over the body and remove or vandalize parts of it until the body is completely dismembered. It is then widely believed that the giant never existed at all.
- "End-Game": A psychological match between a person on death row, who lives with his executioner in a comfortable house, and does not know the time and day of his execution. To pass the time, they are playing chess, while the condemned tries to win a game of persuasion.
- "The Illuminated Man": A precursor to the novel The Crystal World.
- "The Reptile Enclosure": Infrared lights from a newly launched radio satellite trigger thousands of people on the beach to drown themselves.
- "The Delta at Sunset"
- "Deep End"
- "The Volcano Dances"
- "Billennium"
- "The Gioconda of the Twilight Noon"
- "The Lost Leonardo": A painting by Leonardo da Vinci of the Crucifixion of Jesus is stolen from the Louvre Museum. Two art directors, seeking the thief, examine several crucifixion paintings, each also previously stolen, and discern a hitherto-unnoticed man in each one. Not only is the face recognizably the same in each, no matter which artist, country, or century, the portraits of this man are also alterations of the original paintings. They determine he is the Wandering Jew, and also the thief and forger.

=== US edition ===
US edition, Berkley Books, 1964.

- "End-Game"
- "The Subliminal Man"
- "The Last Word of Mr. Goddard"
- "The Time Tombs"
- "Now Wakes the Sea"
- "The Venus Hunters"
- "Minus One"
- "The Sudden Afternoon"
- "The Terminal Beach"

== In popular culture ==
- A copy of the 1987 edition is briefly seen being read by a security guard played by Ken Jeong in the 2019 superhero film Avengers: Endgame, which shares its subtitle with a story in the book.
- "The Drowned Giant" was adapted as part of the Netflix series Love, Death & Robots (2021).

== Reception ==
Dave Pringle reviewed The Terminal Beach for Imagine magazine, and stated that "perhaps the finest collection of a master short-story writer. What more can I say? - except that it is good to see it reprinted in this quality-paperback format. with an excellent cover painting by James Marsh."

== Reviews ==
- Review by Michael Moorcock (1964) in New Worlds SF, #144 September–October 1964
- Review by Donald Malcolm (1964) in Vector 28
- Review by Phil Stephensen-Payne [as by Philip Stephensen-Payne] (1978) in Paperback Parlour, December 1978
- Review by John DiPrete (1978) in Thrust, #10, Spring 1978
- Review by Bruce Gillespie (1989) in SF Commentary, #67
- Review by L. J. Hurst (1998) in Vector 198
- Review by uncredited (2001) in Vector 217
- Review by Andy Sawyer (2001) in Vector 219
- Review [Spanish] by Juan Manuel Santiago (2001) in Las 100 mejores novelas de ciencia ficción del siglo XX
