= Beretta 92 =

Italian semi-automatic pistol

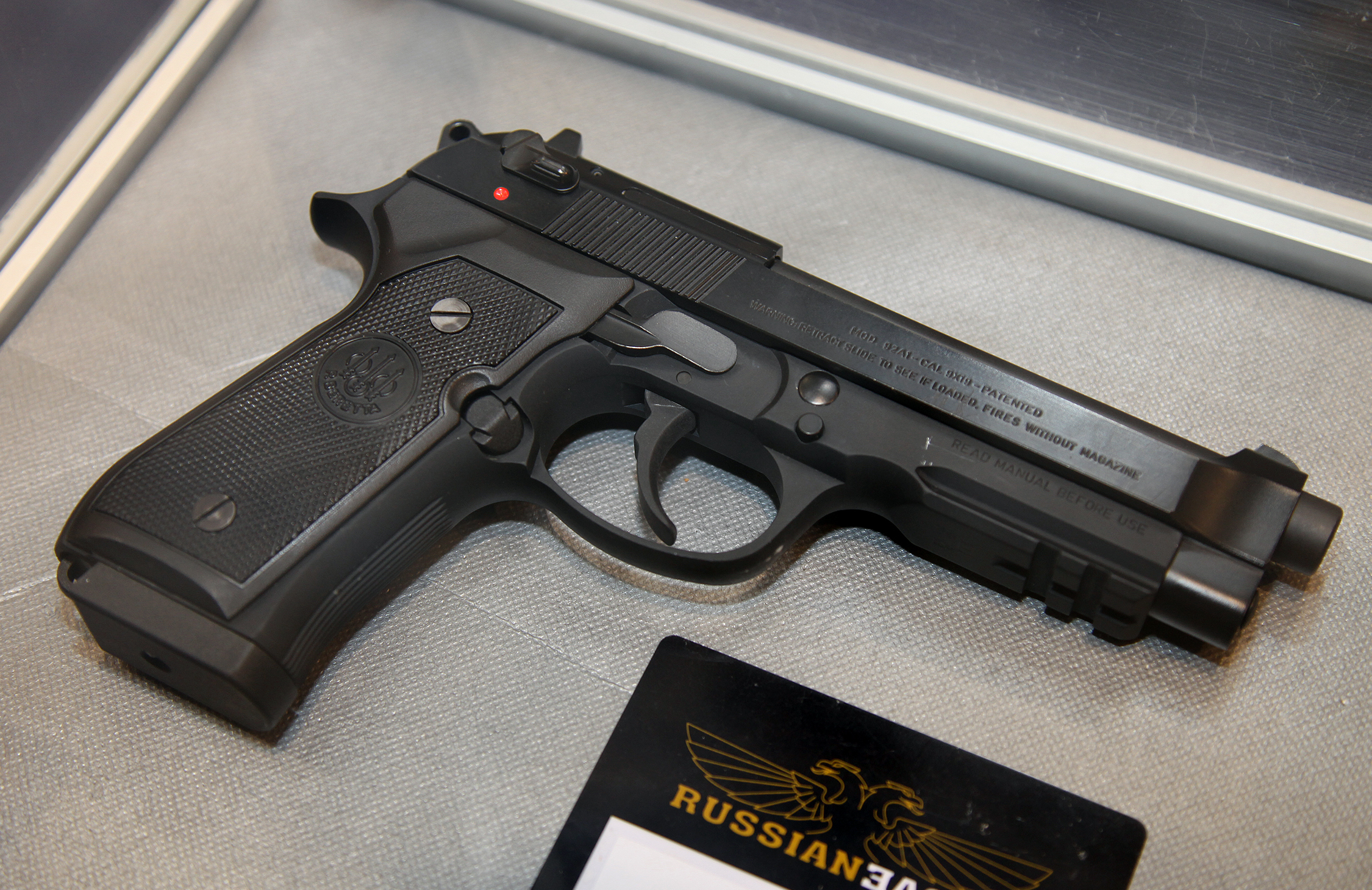
- Beretta 92A1
- Type: Semi-automatic pistol
- Place of origin: Italy

Service history
- In service: 1976–present
- Used by: See Users

Production history
- Designed: 1975
- Manufacturer: Beretta
- Produced: 1976–present
- No. built: 3,500,000
- Variants: See Variants

Specifications
- Mass: 950 grams (34 oz) (92); 970 grams (34 oz) (92S/SB/F/G); 920 grams (32 oz) (92D); 900 grams (32 oz) (Compact/Vertec)
- Length: 217 millimetres (8.5 in); 211 millimetres (8.3 in) (Vertec); 197 millimetres (7.8 in) (Compact/Centurion)
- Barrel length: 125 millimetres (4.9 in); 119 millimetres (4.7 in) (Vertec/Elites/Border Marshal/Combo); 109 millimetres (4.3 in) (Compact/Centurion)
- Cartridge: 9×19mm Parabellum (92 series); .380 ACP (92 series); .40 S&W (96 series); 9×21mm IMI (98 series); 7.65mm Luger (98 series)
- Action: Short recoil, hinged locking piece assisted breechblock
- Muzzle velocity: 381 m/s (1,250 ft/s)
- Effective firing range: 50 m (160 ft)
- Feed system: Detachable box magazine: 10, 15, 17, 18, 20, 30, 32 rounds (92, 98 series); 10, 11, 12, 13, 15 rounds (96 series); 10, 13 rounds (Compact L); 8 rounds (Compact Type M)

The Beretta 92 (also Beretta 96 and Beretta 98) is a series of semi-automatic pistols designed and manufactured by Beretta of Italy.

== History ==
Carlo Beretta, Giuseppe Mazzetti and Vittorio Valle, all experienced firearms designers, contributed to the final design in 1975.

The Beretta 92 was designed in 1975, and production began in 1976. Many variants in several calibers continue to be used to the present.

=== Variants ===
==== 92 ====
Production began in May 1976, and ended in February 1983. Approximately 7,000 units were of the first "step slide" design and 45,000 were of the second "straight slide" type.

==== 92S ====
In order to meet the requirements of some law enforcement agencies, Beretta modified the Beretta 92 by adding a slide-mounted combined safety and decocking lever, replacing the frame-mounted manual thumb safety.

This resulted in the 92S, which was adopted by several Italian law enforcement and military units. The magazine release button is at the bottom of the grip as is customary in Europe.

This model was produced from 1978 to 1982. The name "92S" means "Sicurezza", or "security" (as in "safety"), in Italian.

==== 92SB (92S-1) ====
The 92SB, initially called 92S-1, was specifically designed for the USAF trials. The 92SB model name was officially adopted after winning.

"92SB" means "Sicurezza Blocco", meaning "safety block" in Italian. This refers to both the slide-mounted safety and the internal firing pin block.

Other improvements include ambidextrous safety levers, 3-dot sights and relocating the magazine release catch from the bottom of the grip to the lower bottom of the trigger guard.

The later relocation of the magazine release button means preceding models (92 & 92S) cannot necessarily use later magazines, unless they have notches in both areas.

===== 92SB Compact =====
A compact version with a shortened barrel and slide and 13-round magazine capacity known as the 92SB Compact was manufactured from 1981 to 1991.

==== 92F (92SB-F) ====
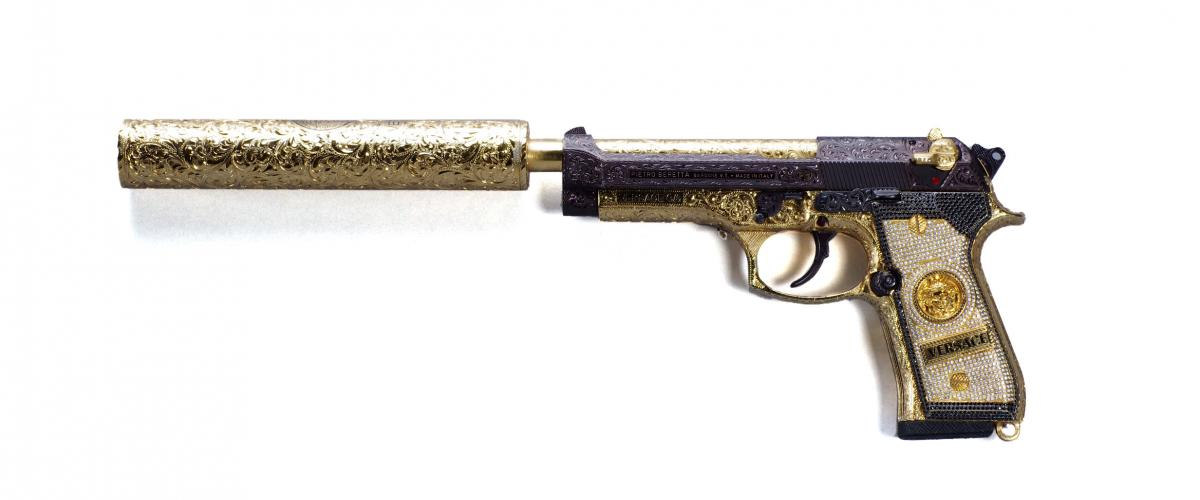
A gold-plated, diamond-encrusted Beretta 92F 9mm Parabellum pistol with matching suppressor confiscated from a safehouse belonging to Joaquín "El Chapo" Guzmán"

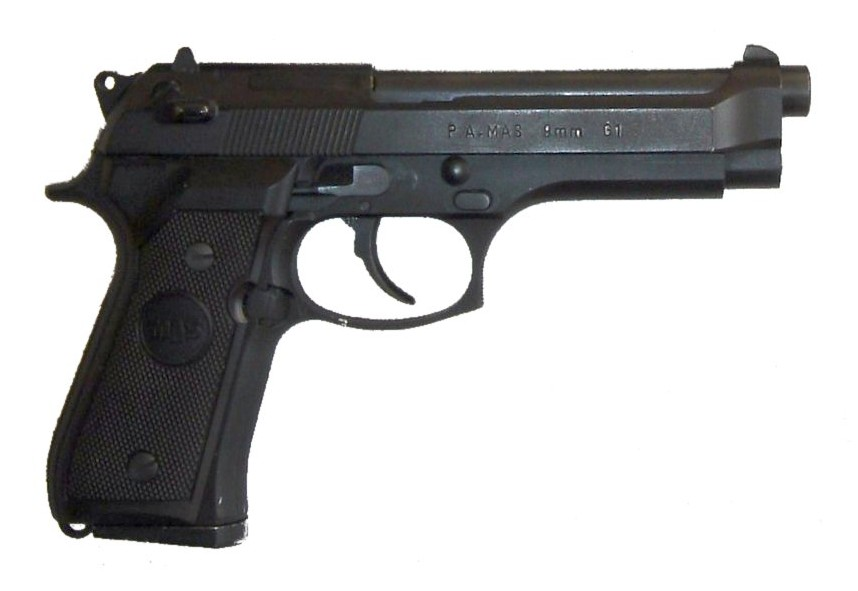
French military PAMAS G1 version of the 92F with a decocking-only lever

In 1984 Beretta introduced a version of the model 92SB slightly modified to create the 92SB-F (the "F" meaning "Federale", or "Federal" in Italian, added to denote entry of the model in U.S. Government federal testing) by making the following changes:

- Design of all the parts to make them 100% interchangeable to simplify maintenance for large government organizations.
- Squared off the front of the trigger guard. The squared-off trigger guard protects both the gun and the shooter during hand-to-hand combat. Some have suggested that the square guard enables the shooter to grip the front of the trigger guard with the supporting forefinger to enhance aiming; however, firearms trainer and Beretta collaborator Ernest Langdon says that using the forefinger to grip the front of the trigger guard is improper technique.
- Recurved the forward base of the grip to aid aiming.
- Hard chromed the bore to protect it from corrosion and to reduce wear.
- New surface coating on the slide called Bruniton, which purportedly provides better corrosion resistance than the previous plain blued finish.

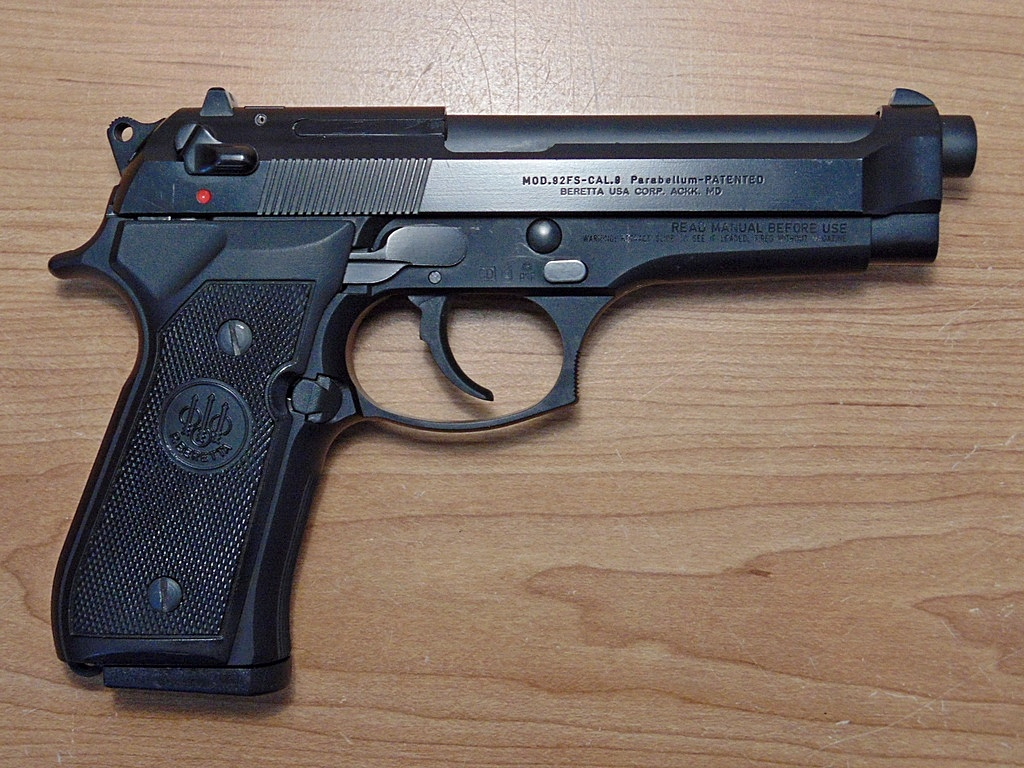
A Beretta 92FS

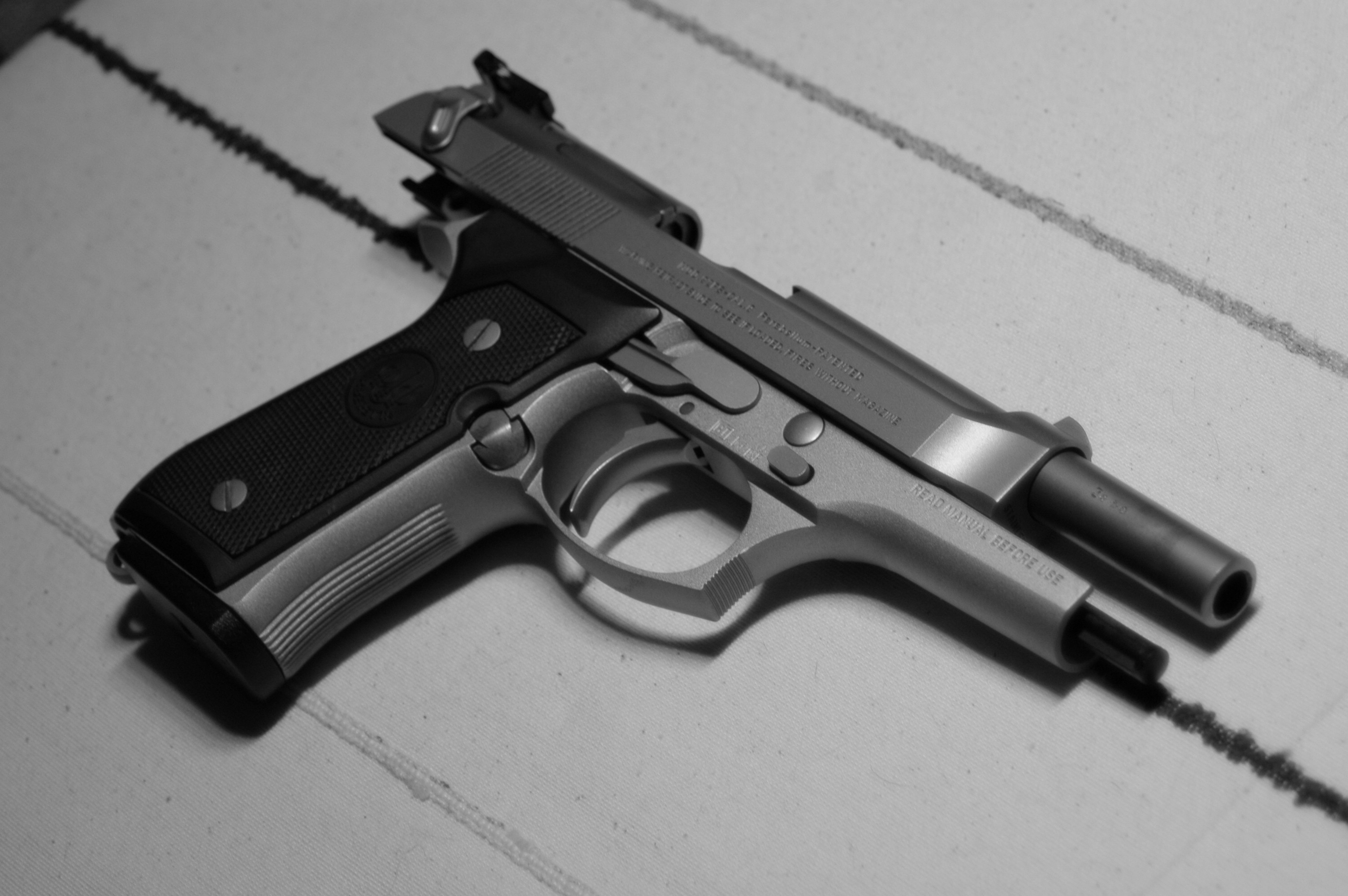
A Beretta 92FS Inox with the slide retracted, showing the exposed ejection port and barrel mechanism

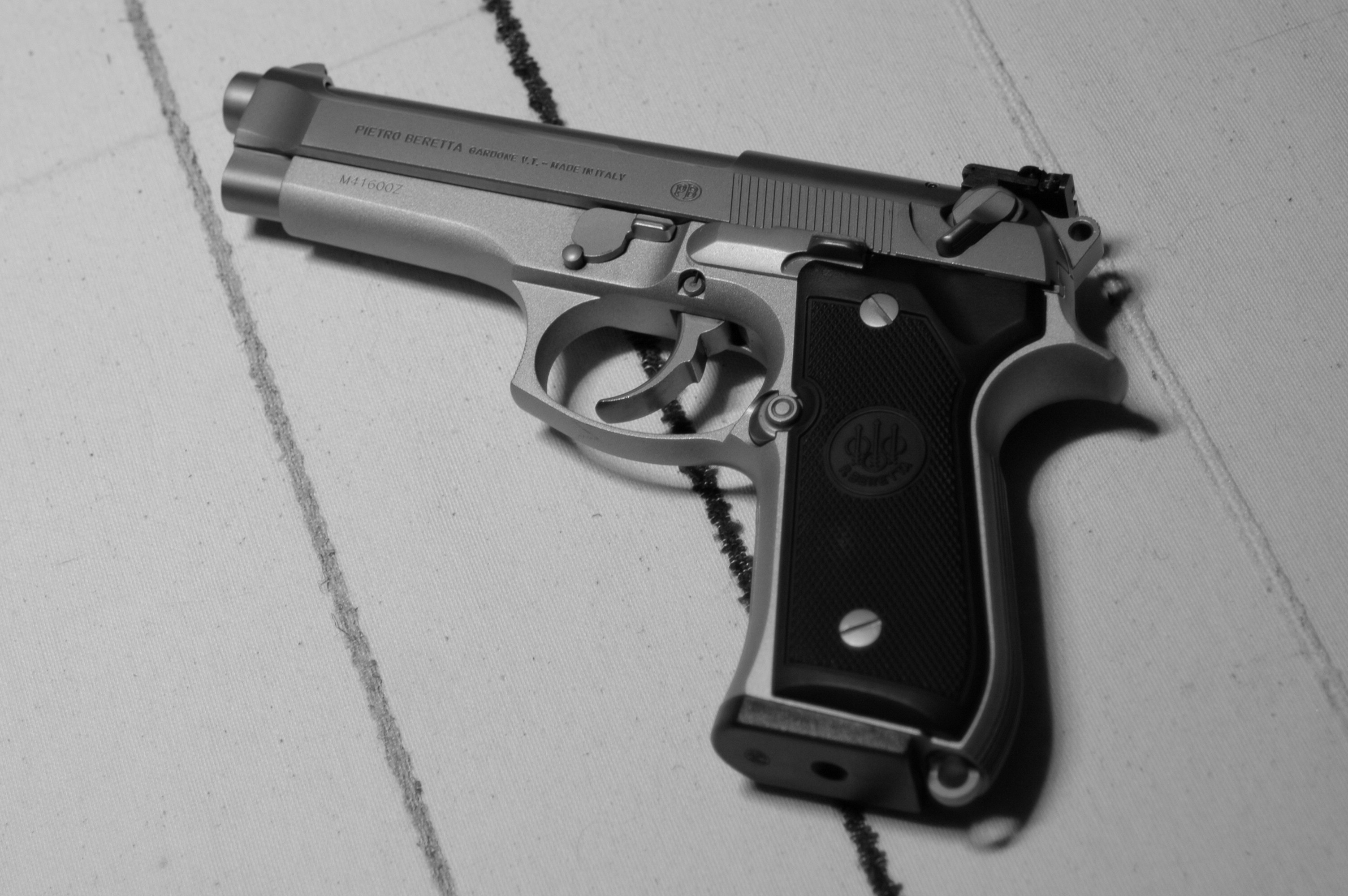
A Beretta 92FS Inox stainless steel pistol

==== 92FS ====
The 92FS has an enlarged hammer pin that fits into a groove on the underside of the slide. The main purpose is to stop the slide from flying off the frame to the rear if it cracks, potentially injuring the user.

The "S" in "92FS" signifies either "Scivolo" (meaning "slide") or "Sicurezza" (meaning "security" or "safety") in Italian, due to the design's improved and safer slide in case of a catastrophic failure.

This was in response to allegations of defective slides during U.S. military testing.

Beretta discovered in an investigation that the slides had passed high-pressure proof testing and magnetic particle inspection when they were made, and metallurgical analysis showed that they had indeed been made to the proper specification.

In reality, the slides were separating due to improperly made ammunition, which was extremely overcharged over NATO specifications.

The "out of spec" ammunition was also causing the frames of SIG Sauer P226 pistols to crack. However, even after investigations were made to absolve the 92F of any problems, Beretta still suffered a massive reputation pitfall, which led to a law suit by Beretta against the US government for defamation.

The 92FS also has a caliber conversion kit to .380 ACP, for the Latin American market. These were produced in small numbers for the Latin American Market due to Military Caliber(9x19mm, .45 ACP) being restricted in many Latin American Countries.

==== 92FS Centurion ====
The 92FS also came as a 92FS Centurion model which featured the shorter barrel and slide of the 92 Compact on a full-size 92FS frame.

== Design ==
The Beretta 92 pistol evolved from earlier Beretta designs, most notably the M1923 and M1951.

From the M1923 comes the open slide design, while the alloy frame and the hinged locking block, originally from Walther P38, were first used in the M1951.

The grip angle and the front sight integrated with the slide were also common to earlier Beretta pistols.

=== Operation ===
The Beretta 92's open slide design ensures smooth feeding and ejection of ammunition and allows easy clearing of obstructions.

The hard-chromed barrel bore reduces barrel wear and protects it from corrosion. The falling locking block design provides good accuracy and operability with suppressors due to the in-line travel of the barrel.

This is in contrast to the complex travel of Browning designed barrels. The magazine release button is reversible with simple field tools. Reversing the magazine release makes left-handed operation much easier.

=== Magazines ===
What were perhaps the Model 92's two most important advanced design features had first appeared on its immediate predecessor, the 1974 .380 caliber Model 84.

These improvements both involved the magazine, which featured direct feed; that is, there was no feed ramp between the magazine and the chamber (a Beretta innovation in pistols).

In addition, the magazine was a "double-stacked" design, a feature originally introduced in 1935 on the Browning Hi-Power.

To keep in line with the introduction of laws in some locations restricting magazines that hold more than 10 rounds, Beretta now manufactures magazines that hold fewer than the factory-standard 15 rounds.

These magazines have heavier crimping (deeper indentations in the side) to reduce the available space while still keeping the same external dimensions and ensuring that these magazines can be used on existing firearms.

Beretta also produces 15-round "Sand Resistant" magazines to resolve issues encountered with contractor-made magazines, and 17-round magazines included with the A1 models. Both magazines function in earlier 92 series and M9 model pistols.

Italian magazine manufacturer Mec-Gar now produces magazines in blue and nickel finishes with an 18-round capacity, which fit flush in the magazine well on the 92 series.

Mec-Gar also produces an extended 20-round blued magazine that protrudes below the frame by 3/4 inch (19 mm). These magazines provide users in unrestricted states with a larger capacity magazine.

=== Construction ===
Increasingly, it has become popular to reduce handgun weight and cost as well as increase corrosion resistance by using polymers. Starting around the year 2000, Beretta began replacing some parts with polymer and polymer coated metal.

Polymer parts include the recoil spring guide rod (which is now also fluted), magazine floor plate, magazine follower and the mainspring cap/lanyard loop. Polymer coated metal parts include the left side safety lever, trigger, and magazine release button.

== Variants ==
The Beretta 92 is available in many configurations and models:

=== Original offerings ===
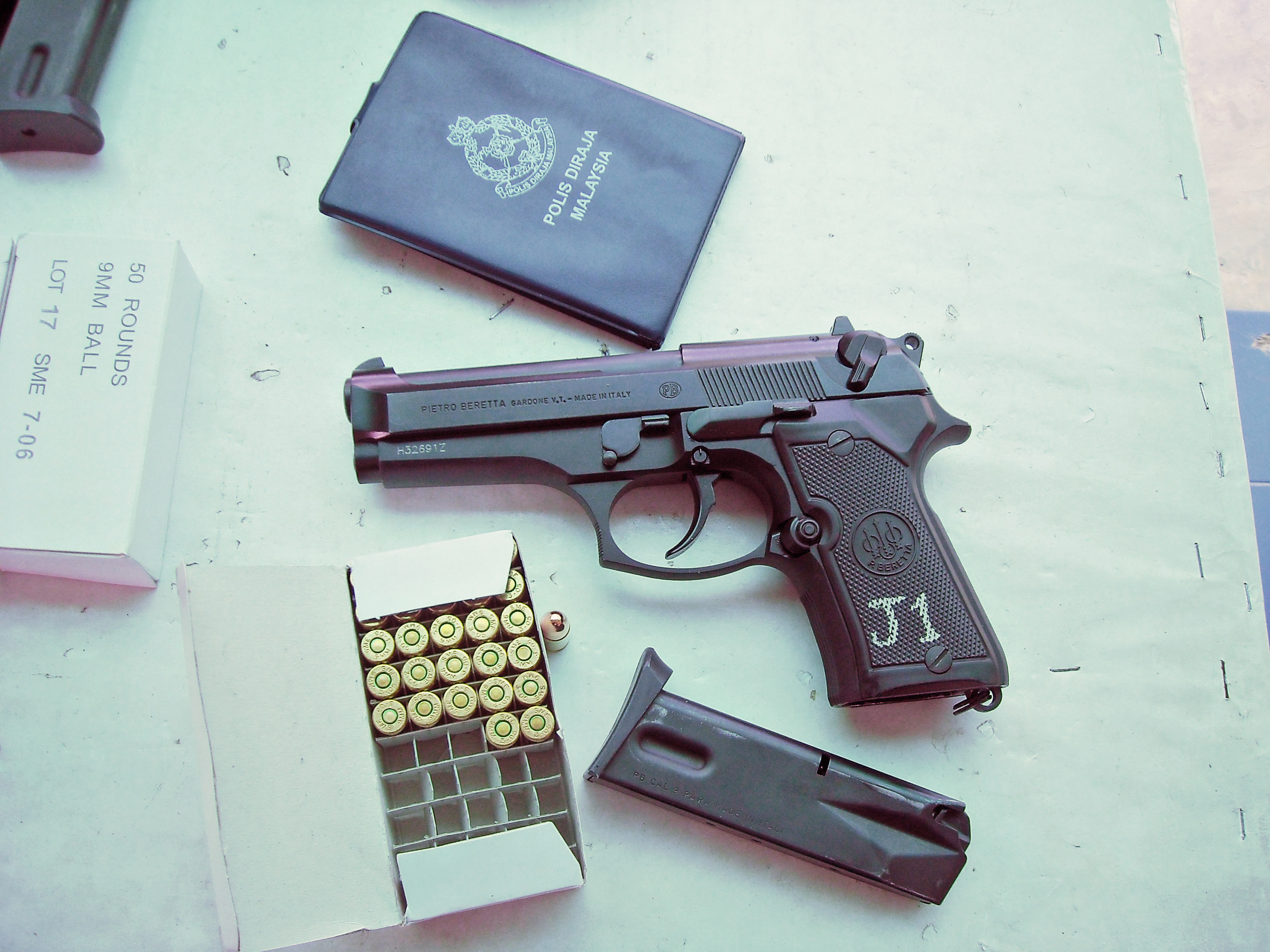
Beretta 92 Compact L owned by the Royal Malaysia Police

==== 92D ====
The 92D is a double action only variant of the 92FS with no safety/decocker lever. The "D" signifies the Italian word "Doppio", meaning "Double-action". The 92D was discontinued by 1998.

92DS

The 92DS (meaning "92D-Safety") is essentially a standard double-action/single-action Beretta 92FS with a safety/decock lever but the flat spurless hammer of the 92D.

92G

The 92G is a redesigned version of the 92FS with the safety eliminated, making for a decocker-only slide.

The "G" signifies "Gendarmerie National", the French national police force that the pistol was designed for.

While the standard 92G was discontinued in 2005, the 92G slide design is still being used on various Beretta designs, including the M9A4.

==== 92G-SD ====
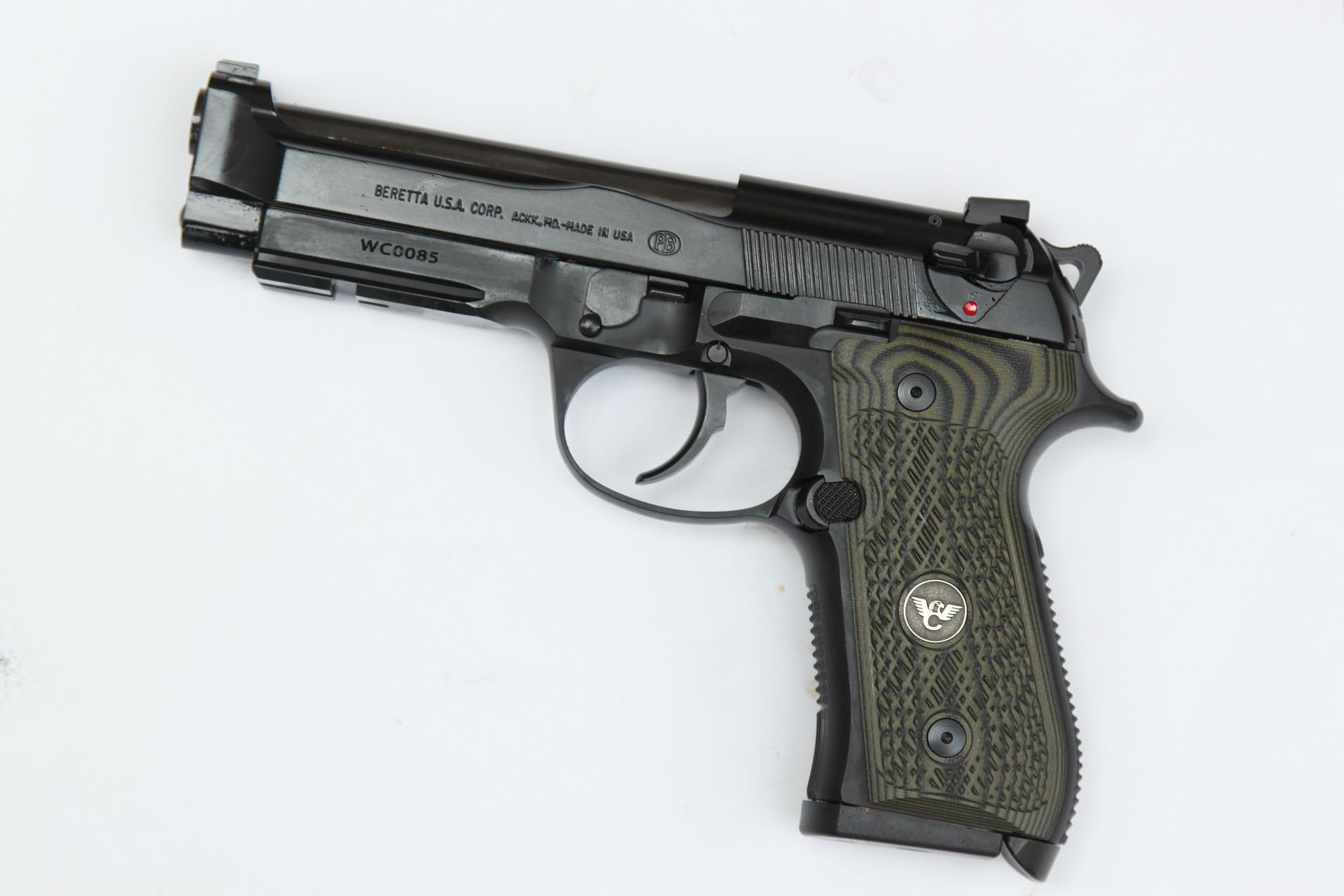
Beretta/Wilson 92G Brigadier Combat, a cooperative effort of Wilson Combat and Beretta. It features heavy Brigadier Slide, stainless match barrel, single function ambi-decock and a refined action.

==== Wilson Combat 92G Brigadier Tactical ====
The Wilson Combat 92G Brigadier Tactical has been produced since 2014.

The Wilson Combat 92G Brigadier pistols differ from the standard Brigadier in that they have a military standard 1913 picatinny rail, all steel controls (as opposed to the polymer coated steel), decock only feature (G-model), 4.7" target crowned barrel, fluted steel guiderod, thin profile G-10 grips, rounded trigger guard, the lighter hammer spring used in the "D" model, Elite II hammer, and their own unique serial number with a "WC" prefix among other features.

==== Vertec ====
The Vertec is a variant of the 92-series with a re-contoured, straight backstrap, removable sights, 1-slot accessory rail, flared magwell, and 4.7 inch barrel.

Although the standard Vertec has been discontinued, the Vertec style backstrap design has been retained on newer, more advanced models such as the M9A3, M9A4 and 92X.

==== 90two ====
The 90two is a 9mm/.40 variant of the 92-series with a redesigned, thicker slide and frame to accommodate an accessory rail, fully dovetailed front sight and .40 S&W pressures.

Other features added include a captive recoil spring, internal recoil buffer, user changeable monogrips and 17-round magazines.

==== 92A1 ====
The 92A1 was introduced in 2010, based on elements from the 92FS and 90two.

It is somewhat of a civilian version of the M9A1, but it has the standard 92-series grip profile, two slots in the accessory rail and a round trigger guard.

==== 96A1 ====
The .40 S&W variant of the 92A1.

==== Centennial ====
The 92 FS Centennial limited edition (500 units) commemorates adoption by the Italian Military of Beretta's earliest semi-automatic pistol, the Model 1915.

This Centennial 92 is notable for its frame-mounted manual safety and single-action-only mechanism. The Beretta medallion in each wood grip panel displays the anniversary dates in Roman numerals, which are also engraved on either side of the steel slide.

The pistol is packaged in a custom M2A1 ammunition can bearing the Centennial logo.

==== M9A1 ====
The M9A1 was adopted by the USMC in 2006. It adds a 1-slot Picatinny rail, more aggressive front and backstrap checkering and a beveled magazine well for easier reloading of the weapon.

M9A1 pistols are sold with physical vapor deposition (PVD) coated magazines developed to better withstand the conditions in the sandy environments in Iraq and Afghanistan.

==== M9A3 ====
The M9A3 (originally called the M9A2, but the name was changed because it was not adopted) was released in 2015 as a potential upgrade for the US military, in response to the Modular Handgun System trials.

The main updates to the M9A3 were a 3-slot Picatinny rail, thinner vertical grip, removable wrap-around grips that can be swapped between Vertec-style and 'old' M9 style, fully removable tritium night sights and a universal slide, which makes the gun convertible from decocker-safety to decocker-only mode. The tip of the barrel is pre-threaded to facilitate addition of a suppressor.

Additionally, the M9A3 comes with 17-round sand-resistant magazines in a beveled shape for easier reloading.

==== M9A4 ====
The M9A4 was released in 2021 as a direct upgrade for the M9A3.

The main updates to the M9A4 include red-dot optic compatible slide and dovetailed tritium night sights, enhanced short reset Xtreme Trigger System, 18-round sand-resistant magazines, and texturized Vertec-style thin grips.

==== Elite LTT – Langdon Tactical ====
The Elite LTT was introduced by Beretta in 2018, in conjunction with firearms trainer Ernest Langdon.

The LTT uses the Vertec slide with front cocking serrations on a modified M9A1 frame, and wears Langdon Tactical G10 grips.

The pistol comes equipped with G-Model decocker, dovetailed front sight, steel trigger and guide rod, improved springs, and a 4.7 inch stainless barrel with target crown, just to name a few of the more prominent features.

==== 92X ====
The 92X was introduced in 2019 as an update to the 92-series and standardization of the Vertec platform.

Similar to the M9A3, it features a 3-slot Picatinny rail, thinner vertical grip, removable wrap-around grips that can be swapped between Vertec-style and 'old' M9 style, fully removable sights (High visibility orange dot) and a universal slide, which makes the gun convertible from decocker-safety to decocker-only mode. Unlike the M9A3, the barrel is not threaded.

The 92X series comes in compact, centurion, and full size variants.

The "X" signifies the "Xtreme-S" trigger system, which reduces trigger reset by 40%, and is adjustable for pre-travel (in single action only models), as well as overtravel.

===== 92X Performance =====
The 92X Performance was introduced in 2019, alongside the 92X, as a competition pistol.

Similar to the 92X, it features a 3-slot Picatinny rail, thinner Vertec-style grip, removable wrap-around grips that can be swapped between Vertec-style and 'old' M9 style, and dovetailed sights.

The 92X Performance however includes a red fiber optic front sight, adjustable rear sight, front and rear slide serrations, skeletonized hammer, competition hammer spring, steel spring recoil rod, extended beavertail, front and rear frame checkering, oversized magazine release, and match take down lever.

The Vertec frame is made of steel rather than alloy, increasing the weight to 48 ounces. The 92X Performance utilizes a frame mounted safety compared to the slide mounted safety of the standard 92X.

==== 92XI ====
The 92XI was introduced in 2023 as an update to the 92-series including a frame-mounted safety similar to the 1911 platform.

Unlike prior models, the 92XI is single-action only, with no double-action trigger pull in the Extreme-S flat-faced trigger. This hybridization is behind the XI moniker, as XI is eleven in Roman numerals, making the name ninety-two eleven.

Similar to the M9A3, it features a 3-slot Picatinny rail, the thinner vertec frame and fully removable sights (High visibility fiber optic front). The 92XI comes in the base model as well as a Tactical model with a threaded barrel and DLC-coated trigger components, and a Squalo ("Shark") edition that brings a different color scheme and adds a Toni system magwell.

==== 92GTS ====
The 92GTS was introduced in 2024 as an update to the 92XI series, adding a double-action/single-action option to the platform through a newly designed "twin sear" and decocker-only configuration, hence the GTS name (G-series, Twin Sear).

The 92GTS has a standard model as well as a Launch Edition that comes in a two-tone finish with wood grips.

=== Full-automatic variants ===
==== 92SB ====
A small number of Beretta 92SB carbines were made for the Los Angeles Police Department.

They feature the same stock as the 93R machine-pistol variant, but are semi-automatic only.

The BATFE removed these short-barrel rifles from the purview of the National Firearms Act.

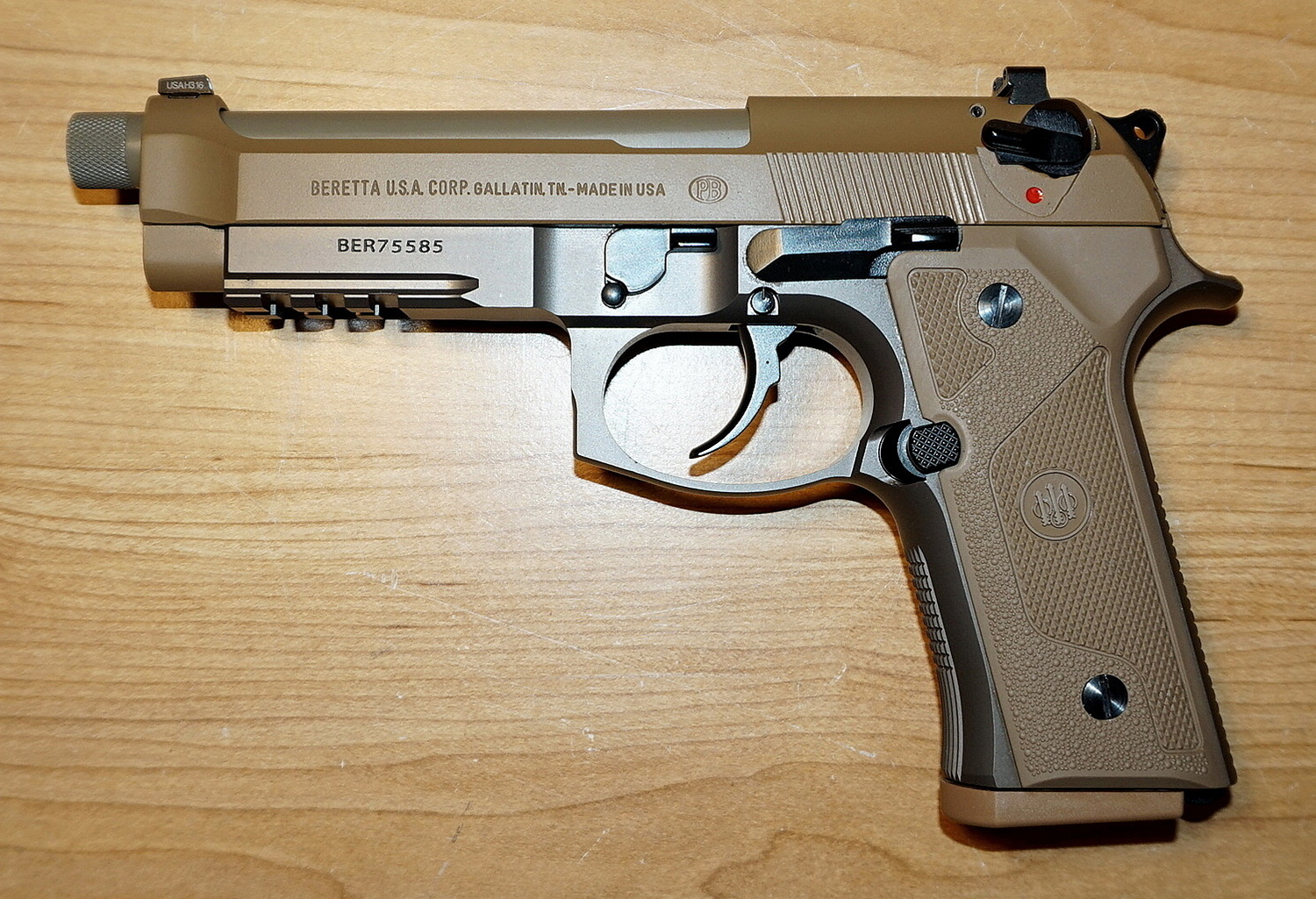
Beretta M9A3 (earth-tone finish)

==== 93R ====
The Beretta 93R is a significantly redesigned 92 to provide the option of firing in three-round bursts. It also has a longer ported barrel, heavier slide, fitting for a shoulder stock, a folding forward grip, and an extended magazine.

Unlike other Berettas in the 90 series it is single-action only, does not have a decocker, and very few are around today.

=== Copies ===
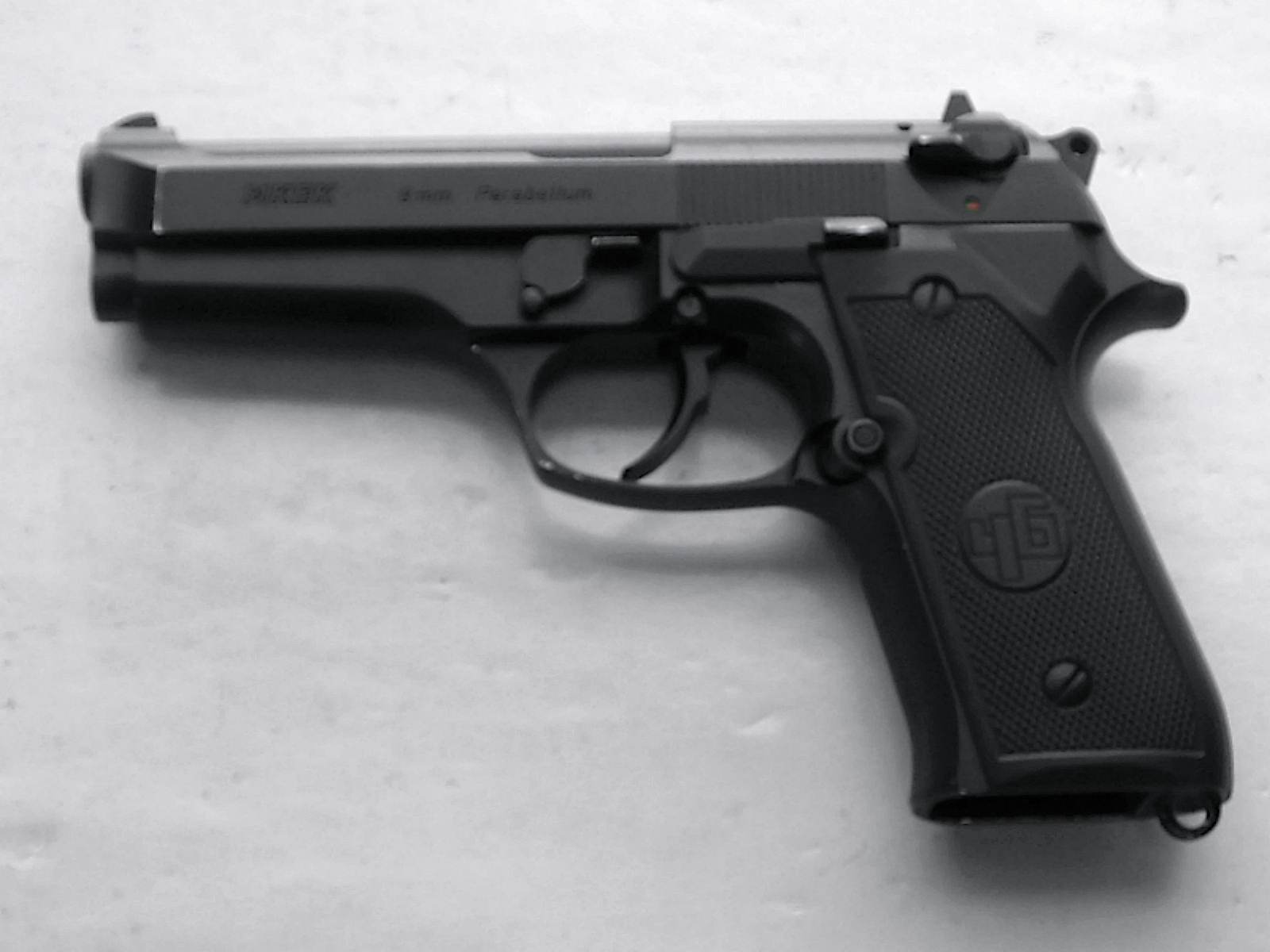
Turkish Beretta 92 copy, the Yavuz 16 Compact

The Beretta 92 was designed for sports and law enforcement use and, due to its reliability, was accepted by military users in countries all over the world.

==== PAMAS G1 / G1S ====
The French Gendarmerie and French Air Force adopted a modified version of the 92 with a decocking-only lever called the 92G as the PAMAS G1.

Approximately 98,000 pistols were made between 1988 and 1996.

Similar to the American M9, the G1 experience issues with slides cracking at the breechface. Though initially blamed on poor-quality steel containing tellerium, the issue was likely caused by overpressure ammunition like with the American pistols. GIAT began replaced the slides of the G1 models beginning in 1990, though struggling financials pushed the bulk of the project to 2000. The pistols' frames were updated to include an enlarged hammer access pin that would keep the slide in place if it should crack. These updated models were designated the PAMAS G1S. Virtually all original G1 models received this upgrade.

==== Helwan 920 ====
Egypt had produced the Beretta 92 under license as the Helwan 920 with the magazine release button at the bottom of the magazine.

==== Yavuz 16 ====
Turkish companies MKEK and Girsan manufactured a copy of the Beretta 92F as the Yavuz 16 for the Turkish Armed Forces and General Directorate of Security. There has been speculation that these were being made under contract from Beretta.

Some of these pistols were imported into the United States by the company American Tactical Imports as the American Tactical 92 or AT-92. The Yavuz 16 was exported to Canada, Colombia, Georgia, Malaysia, Syria and Philippines.

== Users ==
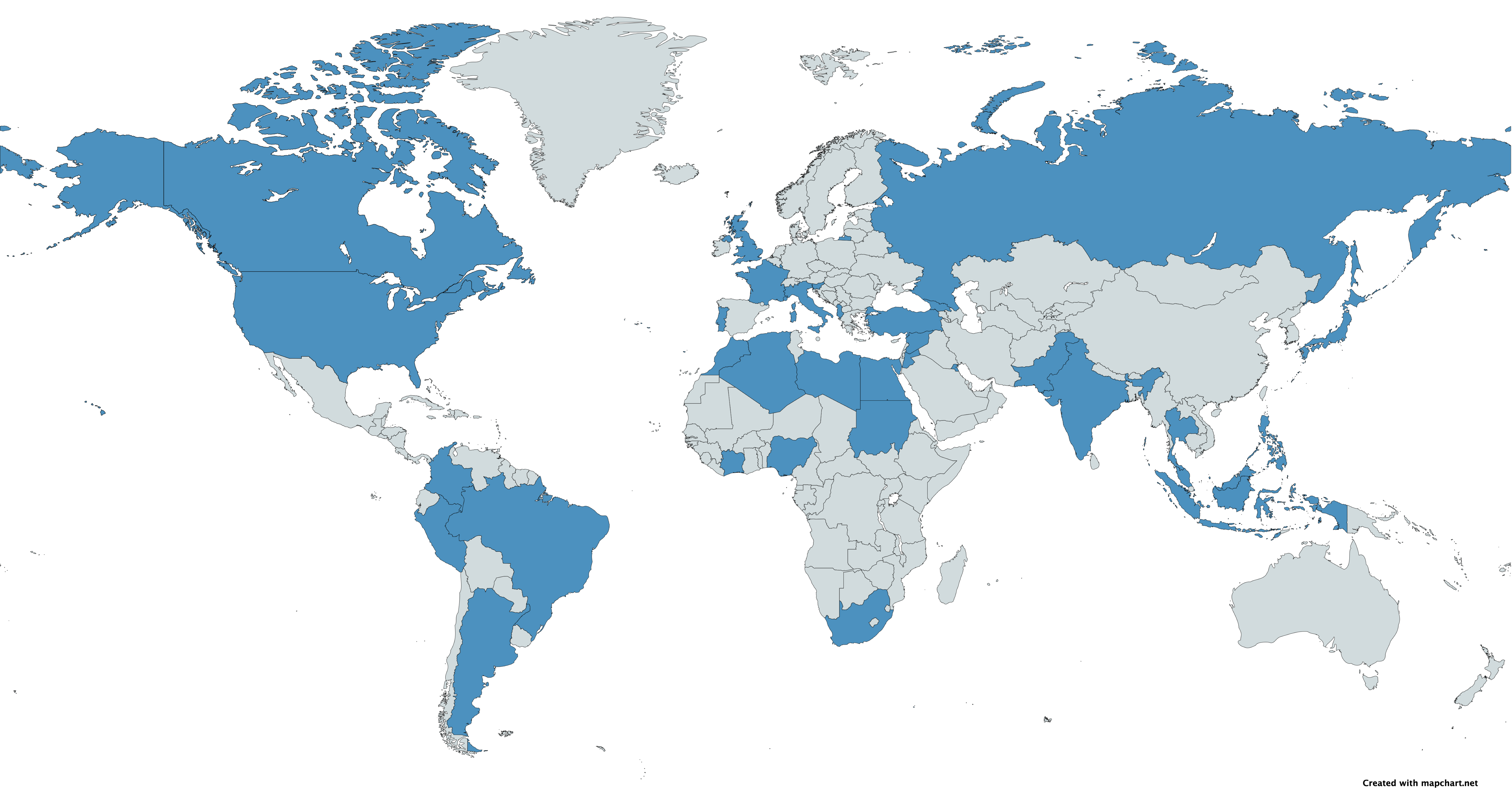
A map with Beretta 92 users in blue

| User | Organization | Model | Quantity | Date | Reference |
|---|---|---|---|---|---|
| Albania | Albanian police and special police forces | | | | |
| Algeria | Special Intervention Detachment | Beretta 92FS | | | |
| Argentina | Gendarmaria Nacional | Beretta 92FS | | | |
| Argentina | Police Forces | Beretta 92FS Compact L | 58+ | | |
| Brazil | Brazilian Armed Forces | Taurus PT-92 | | | |
| Canada | Vancouver Police Department, being phased out in favour of the SIG Sauer P226 | | | | |
| Colombia | Colombian Army; Colombian Navy; Colombian Air Force; Colombian Naval Infantry | Beretta M9 | | | |
| Egypt | Egyptian Army | Helwan 920 | | | |
| France | French Military, Gendarmerie Nationale | PAMAS G1 | 100,000 (97,502 in 2002) | 1989 | |
| Georgia | Georgian Police | Yavuz 16 | _ | _ | |
| India | Mizoram Armed Police, MARCOS | 92S | | | |
| Indonesia | Komando Pasukan Khusus (Kopassus) special forces group of the Indonesian Army | 92SB and 92F | _ | _ | |
| Indonesia | Komando Pasukan Katak (Kopaska) tactical diver group of the Indonesian Navy | 92SB and 92F | _ | _ | |
| Italy | Italian Armed Forces and various police forces | | | | |
| Ivory Coast | Unknown users | Beretta 92F | | | |
| Japan | Various specialized detective units of the Prefectural Police Departments | Vertec | _ | _ | |
| Jordan | Jordanian Armed Forces (JAF) | M9 | _ | _ | |
| Kuwait | | _ | _ | _ | |
| Luxembourg | Unité Spéciale de la Police of the Grand Ducal Police | 92F | | _ | |
| Libya | Libyan National Army (LNA) | M9 | _ | _ | |
| Malaysia | 10 Paratrooper Brigade rapid deployment forces of the Malaysian Army | 92FS | | | |
| Malaysia | Grup Gerak Khas special forces of the Malaysian Army | 92FS | | _ | |
| Malaysia | Royal Malaysia Police | 92 Compact L | _ | _ | |
| Malta | Armed Forces of Malta | 92FS | | | |
| Mexico | Various branches of the armed forces | _ | | _ | |
| Monaco | Compagnie des Carabiniers du Prince | | | _ | |
| Morocco | | | | 2010 | |
| Nigeria | | | | 2010 | |
| Pakistan | Pakistan Army, Pakistan Navy, Law Enforcement | 92F | | | |
| Peru | Armed Forces of Peru, Peruvian National Police | _ | _ | 2010 | |
| Philippines | Armed Forces of the Philippines, Philippine National Police, Bureau of Corrections | _ | _ | _ | |
| Portugal | Military Police | _ | _ | _ | |
| Russia | Law enforcement groups | _ | _ | 2010 | |
| Slovenia | Slovenian Armed Forces Slovenian National Police Force | 92FS | _ | 1991 | |
| Republic of Korea | Republic of Korea Army, Republic of Korea Navy, Republic of Korea Air Force | 92FS | - | - | |
| South Africa | South African Police Service | Vektor Z88 | _ | 1992 | |
| Sudan | | _ | _ | _ | |
| Syria | Syrian Army | Yavuz 16 | _ | _ | |
| Thailand | Royal Thai Armed Forces, Royal Thai Army, Royal Thai Navy, Royal Thai Marine Corps, Royal Thai Air Force, Royal Thai Police, Border Patrol Police | 92FS | _ | _ | |
| Turkey | Turkish Armed Forces | Yavuz 16 | _ | _ | |
| Turkey | General Directorate of Security | Yavuz 16 | _ | _ | |
| United Kingdom | Bermuda Regiment | 92F | | | |
| United States | US Armed Forces, designated as the M9 | 92FS | _ | 1985 | |
| United States | US Border Patrol | 96D | _ | _ | |
| United States | Connecticut State Police | 92 | _ | 1981 | |
| United States | Maryland State Police | 96D | _ | _ | |
| United States | Montgomery County Police Department | 92D | - | - | |
| United States | Prince George's County Police Department | 92F | 1,200 | 1988 | |
| United States | Los Angeles Police Department (LAPD) | 92F & 92FS | - | - | |
| United States | Los Angeles County Sheriff's Department | 92FS & 90-Two | - | - | |

== See also ==
- Beretta 93R
- Taurus PT92
