= Zone of Terror =

Short story by J. G. Ballard

"Zone of Terror" is a short story by British author J. G. Ballard, first appearing in the March 1960 edition of New Worlds (Volume 31, Number 92). It later appeared in the 1962 collection The Voices of Time and Other Stories, in The Disaster Area (1967) and The Complete Short Stories of J. G. Ballard: Volume 1 (2006).

== Plot summary ==
The two characters of the story are Larsen and Bayliss, employees of an unnamed electronics company. The story takes place in a small desert complex, a 're-creational' centre for senior executives. It is revealed that Larsen worked as a programmer for the company's Advanced Design Division, simulating a complex electrical replica of the central nervous system when, overworked and on the verge of a nervous breakdown, Bayliss, a psychologist, pulled him from the project and sent him to stay in a chalet in the complex for a few days' recuperation, where Bayliss also lives.

Whilst waiting for a check up from Bayliss, Larsen reflects on his time living amongst the deserted chalets - initially feeling he is recovering after a few days of relaxation with only occasional human contact from Bayliss and his eventual restlessness of it - and the 'attack' he suffered whilst staying there. The attack is later revealed to be what is first perceived as an hallucination by Larsen one day whilst in the chalet's garage. He sees the figure of a transparent man in the shadows of the garage approach him, until Larsen shuts the door, distraught. Up until now, however, Larsen feels he has recovered from his ordeal, until the attack happens a second time.

One day Larsen starts reading a book on 'Psychotic time', but decides to take a stroll outside instead. When walking around his chalet, he looks into the window and sees a man sitting where he just was and reading the same book, then put the book aside to look out the window. Larsen realises that it is the same man from the garage, and by seeing him clearly, realises that it is himself mere moments ago. Bayliss tells him that the hallucinations are psychoretinal streams of images, and the only way to fuse the two time channels back together is to be in the same place as one of the doubles, and 'forcibly occupy the same physical co-ordinates'. The idea vexes Larsen, who is deeply troubled by the idea of seeing himself in a different time frame, and decided to keep a revolver in his letterbox for protection.

After lunch the following day, Larsen suspects Bayliss has put stimulant in his food to help induce another attack. The story culminates in this final scene where, outside the chalets, Larsen begins seeing more than one double of himself and eventually an enormous rat-like creature whose terrified face is a replica of his own. The spawned duplicates chase Larsen around the complex and eventually Bayliss comes out of his chalet to ask if Larsen's having another attack. Larsen informs him that there are multiple duplicates and to go get his revolver from the letterbox. As Bayliss does this Larson runs to another chalet only to see Bayliss emerge from his own, with the revolver and converse with one of the Larsen copies. This copy begins pointing towards the others as Larsen himself would. Bayliss begins shooting at the other copies and Larsen realises he cannot tell the difference between them. Larsen is eventually shot dead by Bayliss.
