= Glisenti Model 1910 =

Pistola Automatica Modello 1910 Glisenti Model 1910
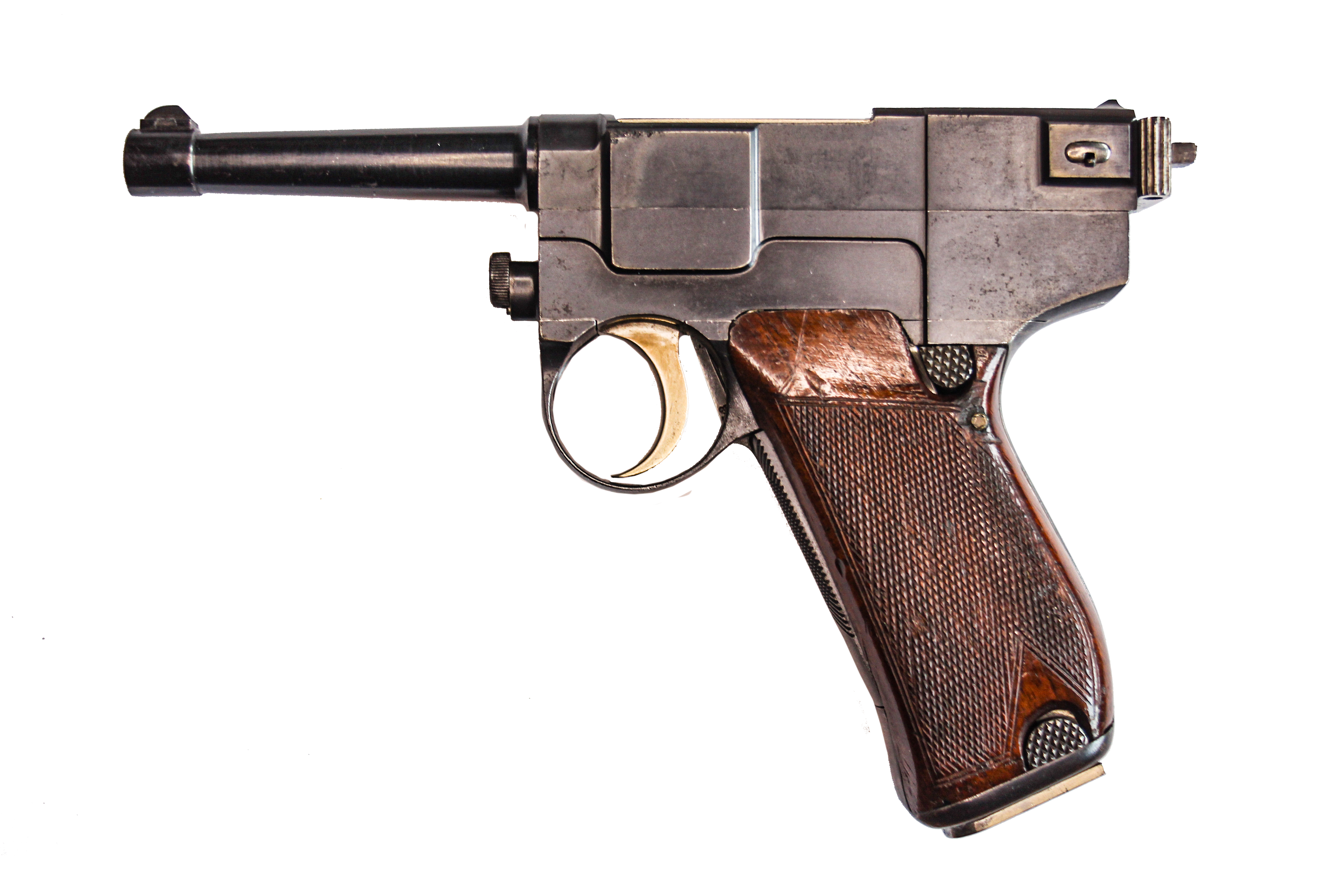
- A Glisenti Model 1910
- Type: Service pistol
- Place of origin: Kingdom of Italy

Service history
- Used by: Royal Italian Army
- Wars: World War I World War II

Production history
- Designer: Bethel Abiel Revelli
- Manufacturer: Metallurgica Brescia già Tempini; Società Siderurgica Glisenti
- Produced: 1909–1910 Glisenti M1910 1913-1914 'Brixia' M1912
- No. built: around 33,000 Glisenti M1910 around 5,000 'Brixia' M1912
- Variants: 'Brixia' Model 1912

Specifications
- Mass: 820 g (1 lb 13 oz) Unloaded
- Length: 207mm (8.15 in)
- Barrel length: 100mm (3.94 in)
- Cartridge: 9 mm Glisenti
- Action: Short recoil, locked breech
- Muzzle velocity: 305 m/s (1,000 ft/s)
- Feed system: 7-round detachable box magazine
- Sights: Fixed front blade and rear notch

The Pistola Automatica Modello 1910, often referred to as Glisenti Model 1910, was a 9 mm calibre semi-automatic service pistol developed by Bethel Abiel Revelli for Società Siderurgica Glisenti and produced by the company Metallurgica Bresciana già Tempini. It was put in production in 1909-1910 to replace the aging Bodeo Model 1889 still used by army officers. It saw extensive service in World War I and World War II with the Royal Italian Army. The Model 1910 has a complex and weak firing system which mandates that the pistol ought to use a weaker version of the widespread 9x19 Parabellum.

== History ==
=== Development ===
The creation of a service pistol to supplant the Bodeo Model 1889 began to be rumored in late 1903, and several arms designers began developing new models for the trials.

The original patent registered by Siderurgica Glisenti in June 1905

The future M1910 pistol was designed by Italian Army officer and inventor Bethel Abiel Revelli, with the collaboration of army chief technician Virgilio Stefano. Revelli spent multiple years developing a working prototype before patenting his design to Società Siderurgica Glisenti of Carcina, near Brescia. In 1906 the Glisenti company acquired new machineries from the United Kingdom to start the production, but in 1907, after the death of Alfredo Glisenti, the board of directors sold the Company's arms manufacturing and patent rights to Metallurgica Brescia già Tempini.

The Glisenti pistol was originally designed to fire a 7.65×22mm bottle-neck cartridge. The pistol being known as the Model 1906 began production in 1908. The Model 1906 failed to impress the Royal Italian Army and was requested to fire a round similar to the German 9×19mm Parabellum. The redesign was named the Model 1910 and was formally adopted by the Royal Italian Army as the Pistola Automatica Modello 1910. To reduce recoil and because of the pistol's weak locking design, the Model 1910 had to fire the 9mm Glisenti. The 9mm Glisenti is structurally similar to the 9×19mm Parabellum but has a reduced charge and muzzle velocity.

== Description ==
An officer of the Alpini wielding a Glisenti alongside other troops with Carcano rifles

The Model 1910 fires from a locked breech. When fired, the barrel and bolt recoil together. The barrel will stop in a rearward position. The bolt, unlocking itself, will then continue forward, stripping the chamber and driving the barrel forward again. After this action, a wedge will rise from the frame and lock the entire frame back into position. This firing system was not strong and had to fire cartridges weaker than the comparable 9×19mm Parabellum calibre. The screw at the front of the frame, when undone will allow the removal of a plate on the left side of the pistol granting access to the moving parts within the pistol. This design was not stiff enough to sufficiently support the left side of the barrel extension and after prolonged firing, the left plate was prone to loosening. The only safety on the pistol was a small lever set in front of the grip.

The Mod. 1910 pistols will have the Metallurgica Bresciana già Tempini logo (stylized MBT) stamped on top of the frame, a FAB 909 or FAB 910 stamp on the right side, indicating the approval from the Regia Fabbrica d'Armi Brescia, and the Army inspector initials, TM, as Turani Mauro, stamped on several parts.

== Further development ==
In 1912, Metallurgica Bresciana già Tempini attempted to improve the design of the Model 1910. The improved pistol, referred to as the 'Brixia' (as all M.B.T. prototypes were) mod. 1912, was submitted to the Royal Italian Army for approval. The Brixia had a strengthened frame and removed the grip safety but was not a big enough improvement to make a change in the Royal Italian Army. The Brixia was later to be sold to the civilian market but the outbreak of World War I led to the cancellation of the project. This variant was adopted by the Italian Royal Navy as Pistola Automatica Mod. 1913 tipo "Regia Marina", produced from 1913 to 1914 in 5,000 units.

The mod. 1910 remained in production just for two years, 1909 and 1910, with about 33,000 units produced. The mod. 1910 pistol was the most widespread automatic pistol in use by Italian Army officers, until it began to be phased out by the Spanish produced Ruby pistol and Beretta M1915. The Glisenti was declared obsolete once replaced by the Beretta Mod. 34, but saw limited service in World War II.

== Sources ==
- Fowler, Will; North, Anthony; Stronge, Charles (2007). Pistols, Revolvers, and Submachine Guns. East Bridgewater, Massachusetts: World Publications Group. ISBN 1-57215-595-7.
- Hogg, Ian; Weeks, John (2000). Military Small Arms of the 20th Century (7th ed.). Iola, Wisconsin: Krause Publications. ISBN 0-87341-824-7.
- Hogg, Ian; Walter, John (2004). Pistols of the World (4th ed.). Iola, Wisconsin: Krause Publications. ISBN 0-87349-460-1.
- Kinard, Jeff (2003). Pistols: An Illustrated History of Their Impact. Santa Barbara, California: ABC-CLIO. ISBN 1-85109-470-9.
- McNab, Chris (2004). The Great Book of Guns. San Diego, California: Thunder Bay Press. ISBN 1-59223-304-X.
