= Beretta M1935 =

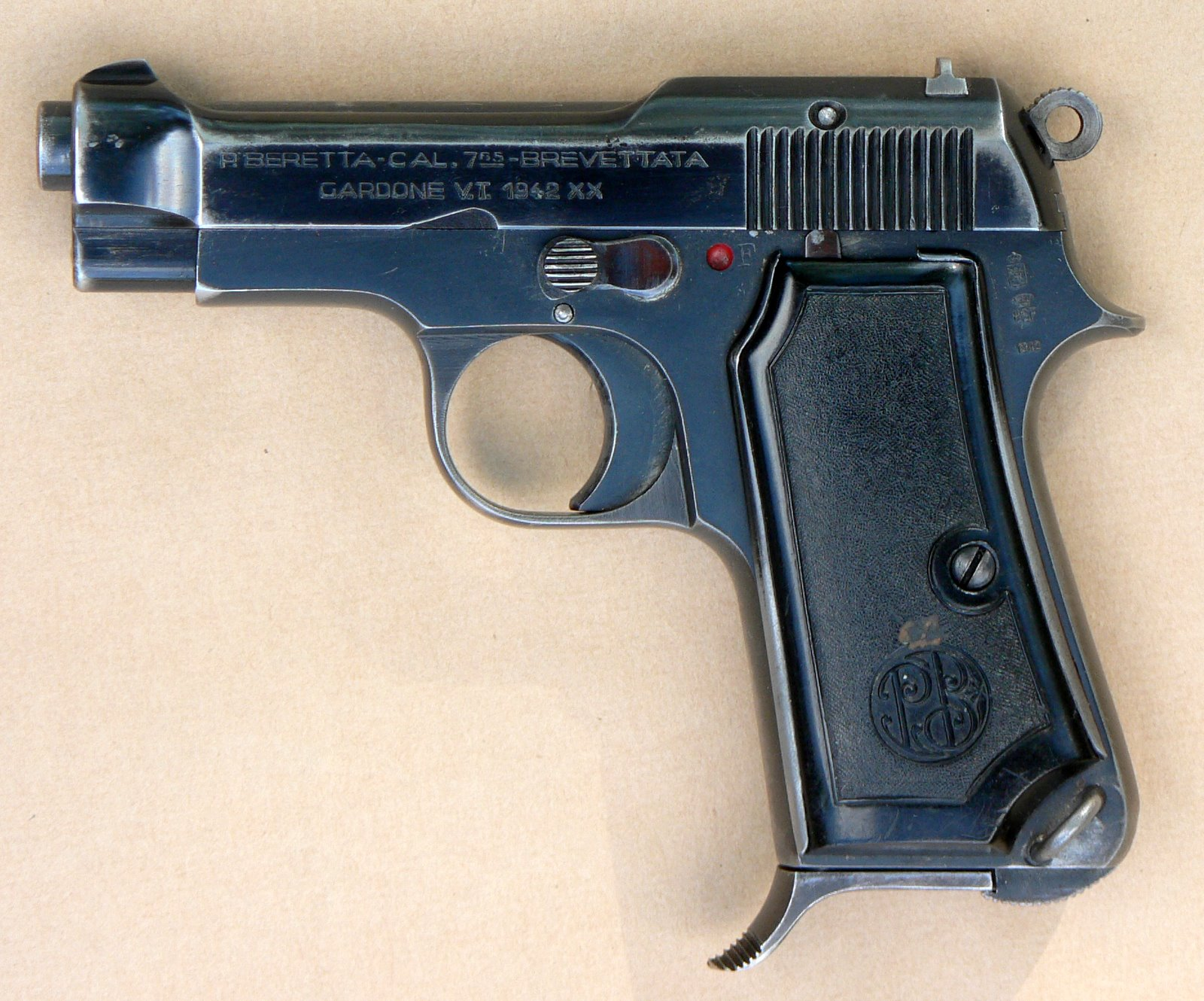
- Type: Semi-automatic pistol
- Place of origin: Italy

Service history
- In service: 1937
- Used by: See Users
- Wars: World War II

Production history
- Manufacturer: Beretta
- Produced: 1935–1967
- No. built: Approx. 525,000

Specifications
- Cartridge: 7.65×17mm Browning SR (.32 ACP)
- Action: Blowback
- Muzzle velocity: 925 ft/s (282 m/s)
- Feed system: 8-round detachable box magazine

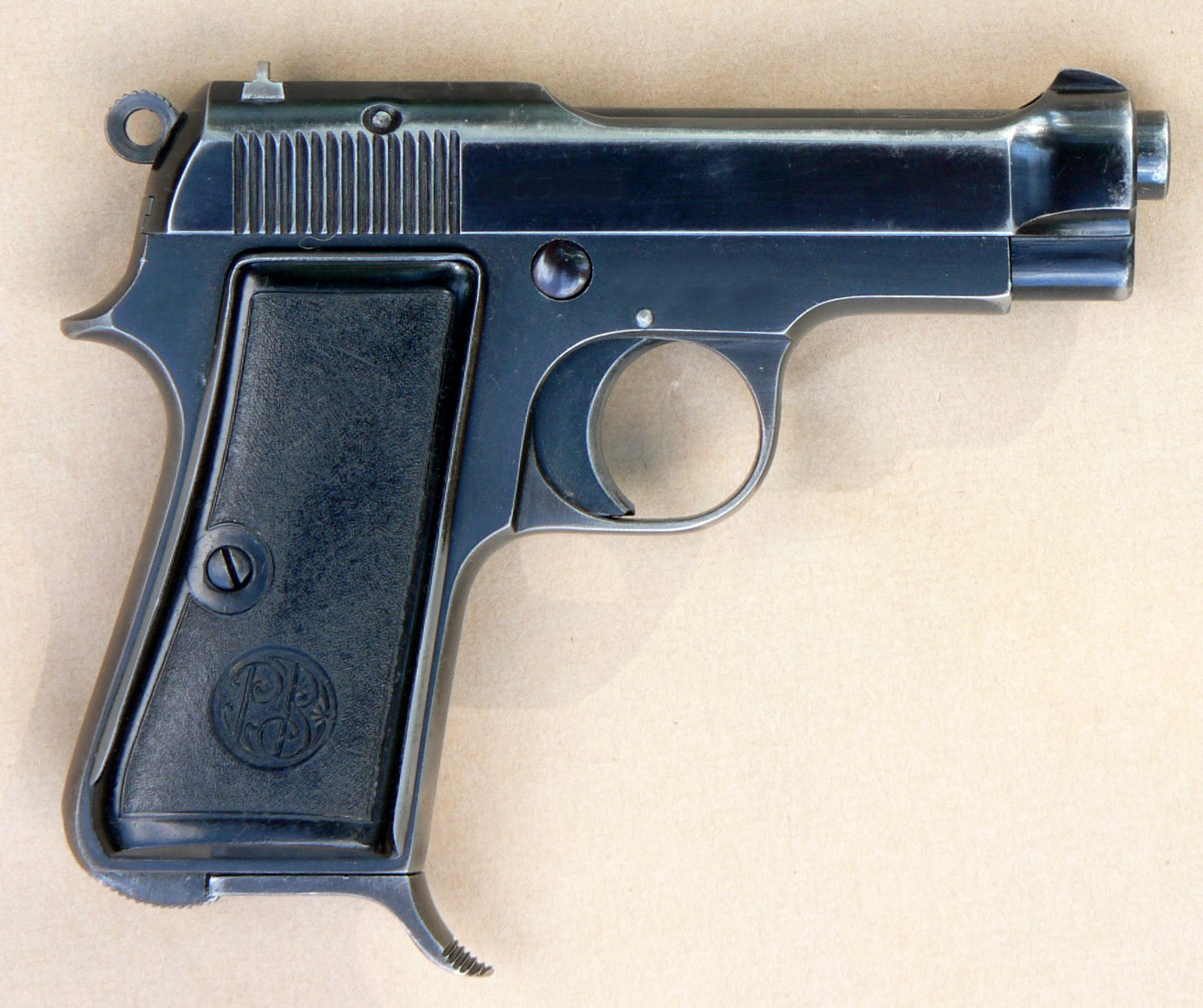
M1935 right side

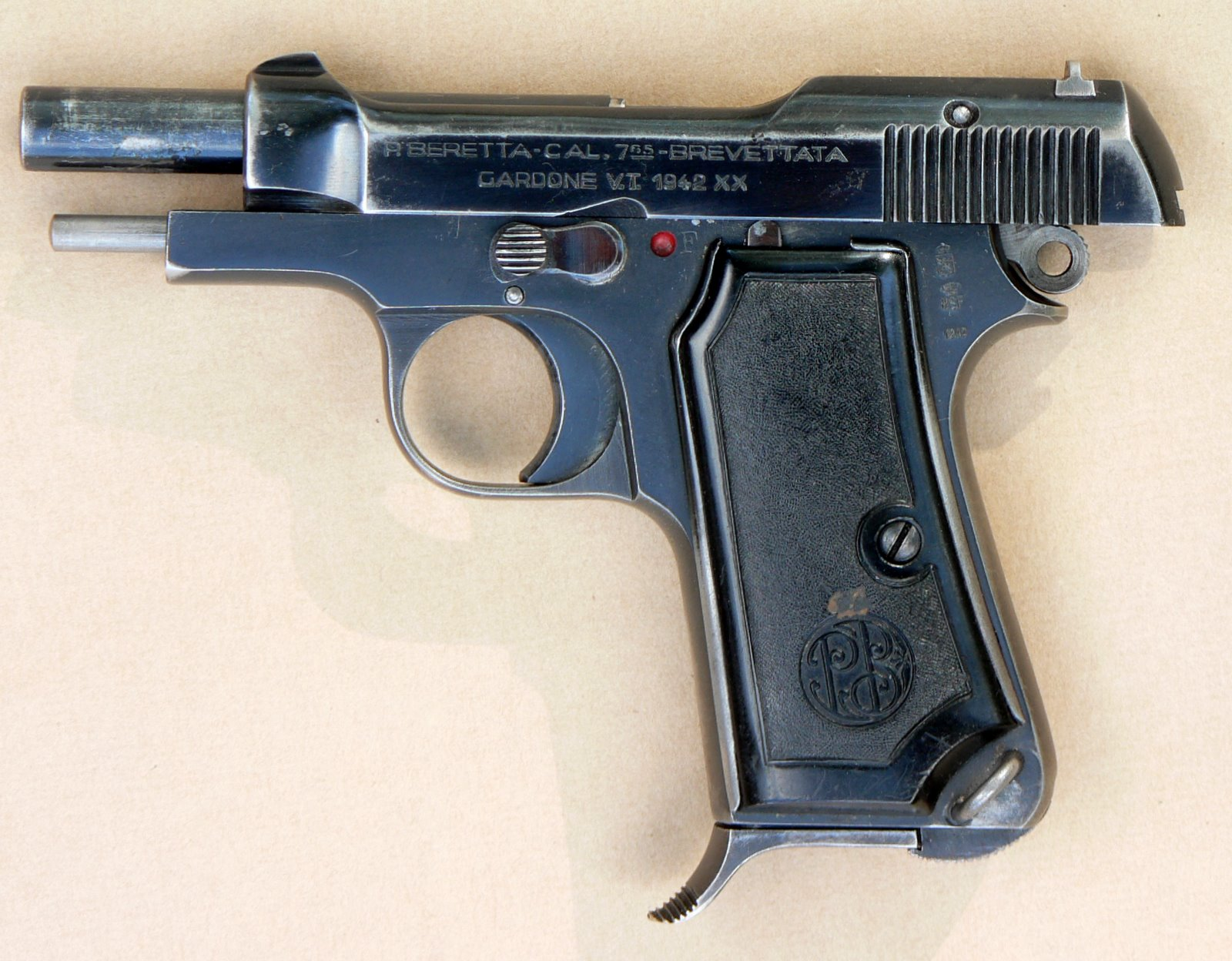
M1935 slide open

The Beretta M1935 is a compact .32 ACP caliber blowback pistol that was manufactured by Italian firm Beretta.

== History ==
In the early 1930s, the Italian army was impressed by the Walther PP pistol. Beretta did not want to lose a big Italian military contract and designed the compact M1934 for the Italian army, which accepted it in 1937. The M1935 is simply an M1934, modified to fire .32 ACP ammunition.

== Specifications ==
The M1935 is a single-action semi-automatic blowback pistol that fires .32 ACP ammunition. It is constructed from carbon steel with plastic grips and is equipped with a frame safety that also acts as a take down lever and slide hold open. When the last shot has been fired the slide is retained open by the empty magazine and must be held open manually by the safety lever to reload the pistol. The magazine capacity is eight rounds.

== Intended market ==
The M1935 was purpose built and designed for the Italian armed forces; however, it was also sold to the civilian market and issued to the German forces in 1944 and 1945.

== Design advantages ==
Fitted with the Beretta-style open slide, the M1935 has a reliable feeding and extraction cycle. It was made with few parts and is very simple to maintain. The M1935 has a very robust construction with long service life if properly maintained.

== Limitations ==
The low magazine capacity of eight rounds and short effective range reduces the M1935 to a last resort self-defense weapon. The slide is not of the self-catching type; the magazine retains the action to the rear. When the magazine is removed the action returns forward on an empty chamber. This slows down reloading of the pistol. However, if the safety is thumbed into the safe position it also acts as a slide catch, the magazine can then be released and a full magazine can be inserted, the slide release / safety can then be released, loading a round, then the pistol can now be fired in single action.

== Production ==
- From 1935 to 1967, about 525,000 units.
- Mod. 1935 cal. 7.65 / .32ACP
- Start / end of production from 1935 to 1967
  - Quantity produced about 525,000
- Start - End -Serial numbers
  - 1935 - 1959 from about 410000 to 923048
  - 1962 - 1963 from A10001 to A14130
  - 1966 - 1967 from H14131 to H14673

== World War II prize guns ==
The Beretta M1935 was captured in huge numbers during World War II from Italian and German armed forces by allied soldiers, who liked it because of its small size, rugged design and good construction. Many of these captured pistols are operational to this day and widespread in the US, Canada, Australia, New Zealand, France and in the United Kingdom. The M1935 is compact and easy to hide, with ammunition available for it.

== Users ==
- Italy
- Nazi Germany
- Finland
- Japan

== See also ==
- Beretta M1934
