= Medusa Model 47 =

Multi-caliber revolver

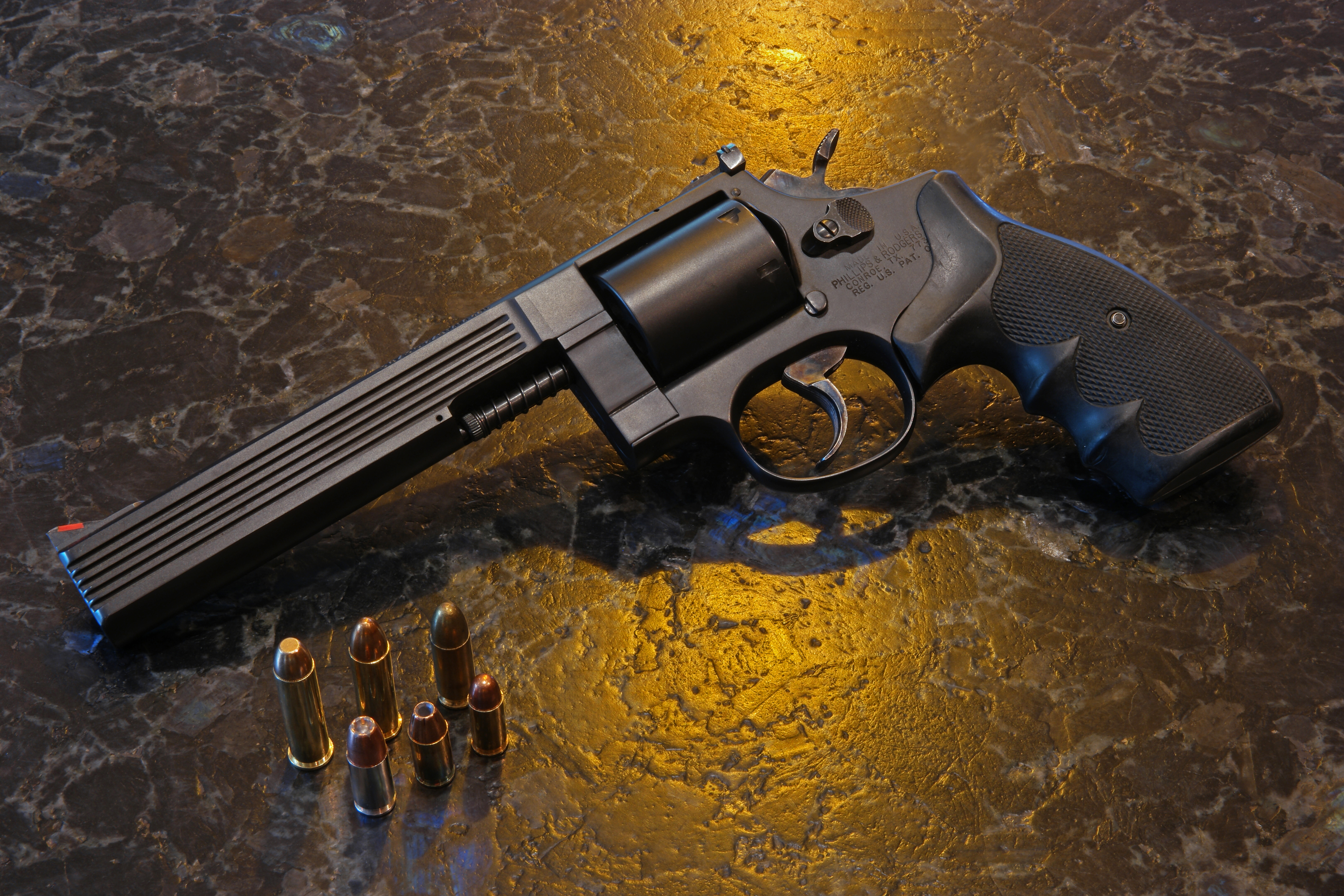
- Type: Revolver
- Place of origin: United States

Production history
- Designed: 1990s
- Manufacturer: Phillips & Rodgers Inc.

Specifications
- Mass: 46 oz (1.3 kg) (approximate for 6-inch barrel)
- Barrel length: 2.5 to 6 in (64 to 152 mm)
- Cartridge: Various
- Caliber: .38 caliber/9 mm caliber
- Action: Double action / single action
- Feed system: 6-round cylinder
- Sights: Iron sights

The Medusa Model 47 (or Medusa M47) is a revolver manufactured by Phillips & Rodgers Inc. of Huntsville, Texas, in the late 1990s. Based on the Smith & Wesson K frame, it is notable for being capable of chambering and firing approximately 25 different cartridges within the 9 mm caliber family, such as: .357 Magnum, .38 Special, .380 ACP, and 9×19mm Parabellum. While smaller diameter cartridges can be fired, accuracy suffers. The revolver was not a commercial success and the company that produced them ceased operations after just a few hundred units were made.

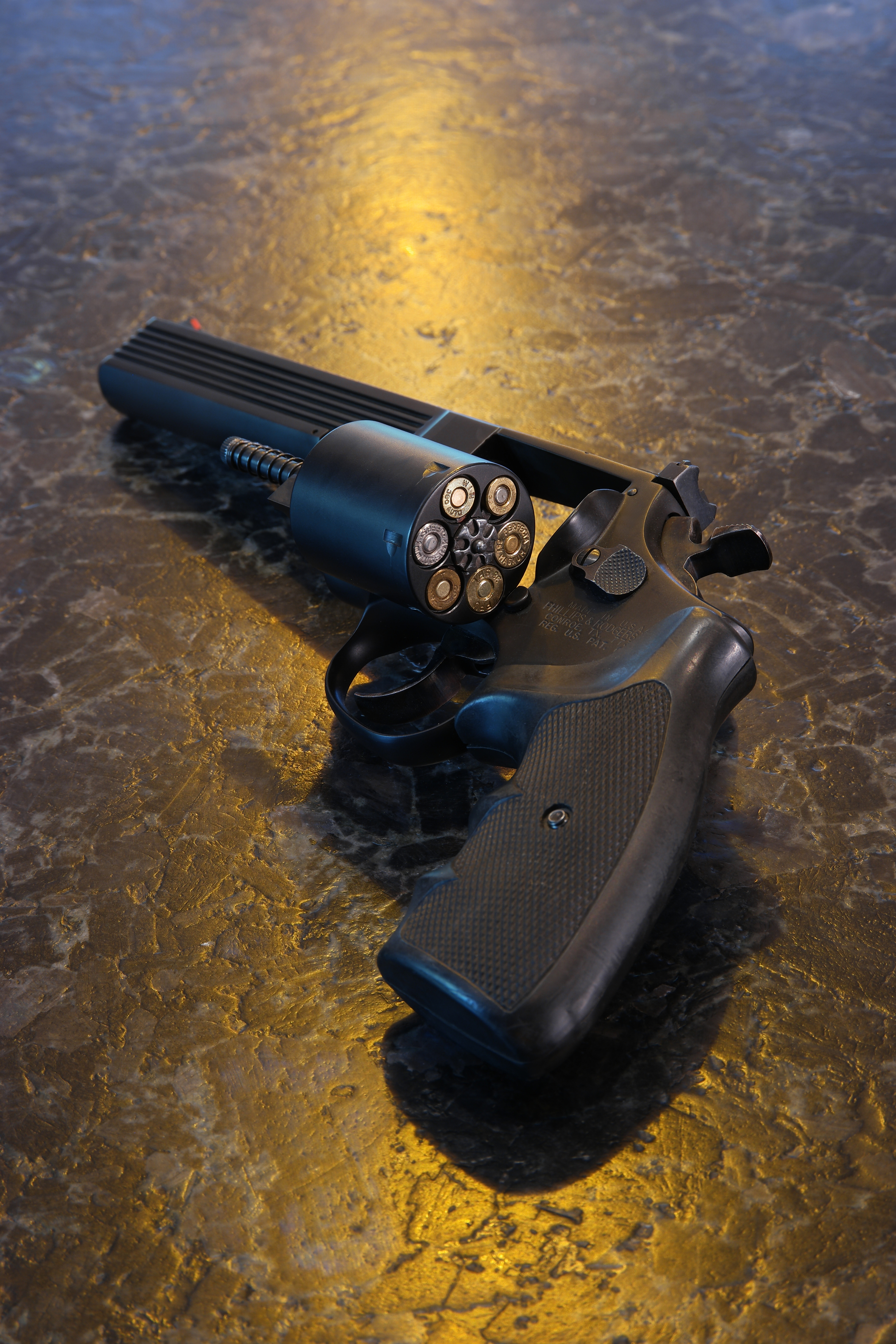
With a swing-out cylinder

== History ==
The company that created the Medusa M47 is Phillips & Rodgers Inc., designed principally by Jonathan W. Philips Jr and Roger A. Hunziker, who produced a relatively small numbers of the hand gun in the late 1990s. Jonathan W. Phillips was a gunsmith and he also worked as a computer scientist for NASA. He was mainly responsible for the designing of the cylinder, extractor and ejector mechanism as well as the system that is used for positioning the cartridges. He applied for two patents on February 3, 1993, for the “Ejector and cartridge positioner for revolvers” and the "Ejector and cartridge positioner". He later filed for a patent that was called "Bore for weapons" on February 27, 1996, that outlines the rifling that the Medusa was going to use. Roger A. Hunziker designed the firing pin mechanism for the Medusa. He filed for a patent on August 1, 1995, for the "Firing pin mechanism". Phillips & Rodgers Inc. not only produced the Medusa M47 revolver but they also made several conversion cylinders for revolvers made by Smith & Wesson, Colt, and Ruger. Very few of these revolvers were actually produced.

== Firing pin ==
The firing pin mechanism was designed by Roger A. Hunziker. It is very similar to the system of Smith & Wesson revolvers. The firing pin is not a part of the hammer. Instead, it floats freely in the frame while under spring tension, so it does not rest against the primer of a cartridge. The hammer has a special feature: unless the trigger is squeezed, it will not be in contact with the firing pin. Instead, it rests a few millimeters back. There is also a transfer bar system between the hammer and firing pin. This allows the hammer to hit the firing pin only when the bar is up and the trigger is pulled.

== Cylinder ==
The design of the cylinder includes a spring-loaded tooth that extends into the chamber. When a rimmed cartridge is loaded, the tooth is pushed out of the way into the center of the cylinder by the cartridge and remains there until the round is extracted. The rim of the cartridge and the frame hold the round in place. When a rimless pistol cartridge is placed in the cylinder, there is no rim to stop the round from sliding down the chamber if it is not head spaced for that caliber. Thus, when the rimless cartridge is inserted, the tooth will be pushed down initially as the wall of the case slides in, but when the extraction groove near the base of the case is over the tooth, it will be pushed back out by spring pressure and catch the round. The tooth will keep the cartridge from sliding out the front of the cylinder, and the back of the frame will keep it from sliding out the back.

== Construction ==
The cylinder is made of mil spec 4330 modified vanadium steel. The Medusa M47 is based on the Smith & Wesson’s K frame, which is one of the most common revolver frame sizes, especially for revolvers that are chambered in the 9mm, .38, and .357 family of calibers. The revolver is able to be fired in both double and single action. Revolvers of this size have been very popular with police and military groups as well as the civilian market due to its reasonable weight and dimensions. In order to handle the immense pressure of the various rounds the pistol can fire the frame has to be very strong. It is constructed of 8620 steel which is hardened to 28 Rockwell. The barrel is composed of 4150 chromemoly steel. The barrel is also fluted, which may save some weight and speed up cooling of the barrel, but in practical terms these effects are minimal in a firearm so small, so the fluting is mostly for style.
