= Chronopolis (short story) =

1960 short story by J. G. Ballard

- Author: J. G. Ballard
- Language: English
- Genre: Science fiction
- Publication date: 1960
- Publication place: England

Chronopolis is a science fiction short story by British writer J. G. Ballard, first published in 1960. The story begins with a man in prison, Newman, and proceeds to examine his fascination with the concept of time in a world where clocks have been prohibited and are regulated by time police.

"Chronopolis" appears in an anthology edited by Andrew Goodwyn, Science Fiction Stories.
