= Beretta M1934 =

Italian semi-automatic pistol

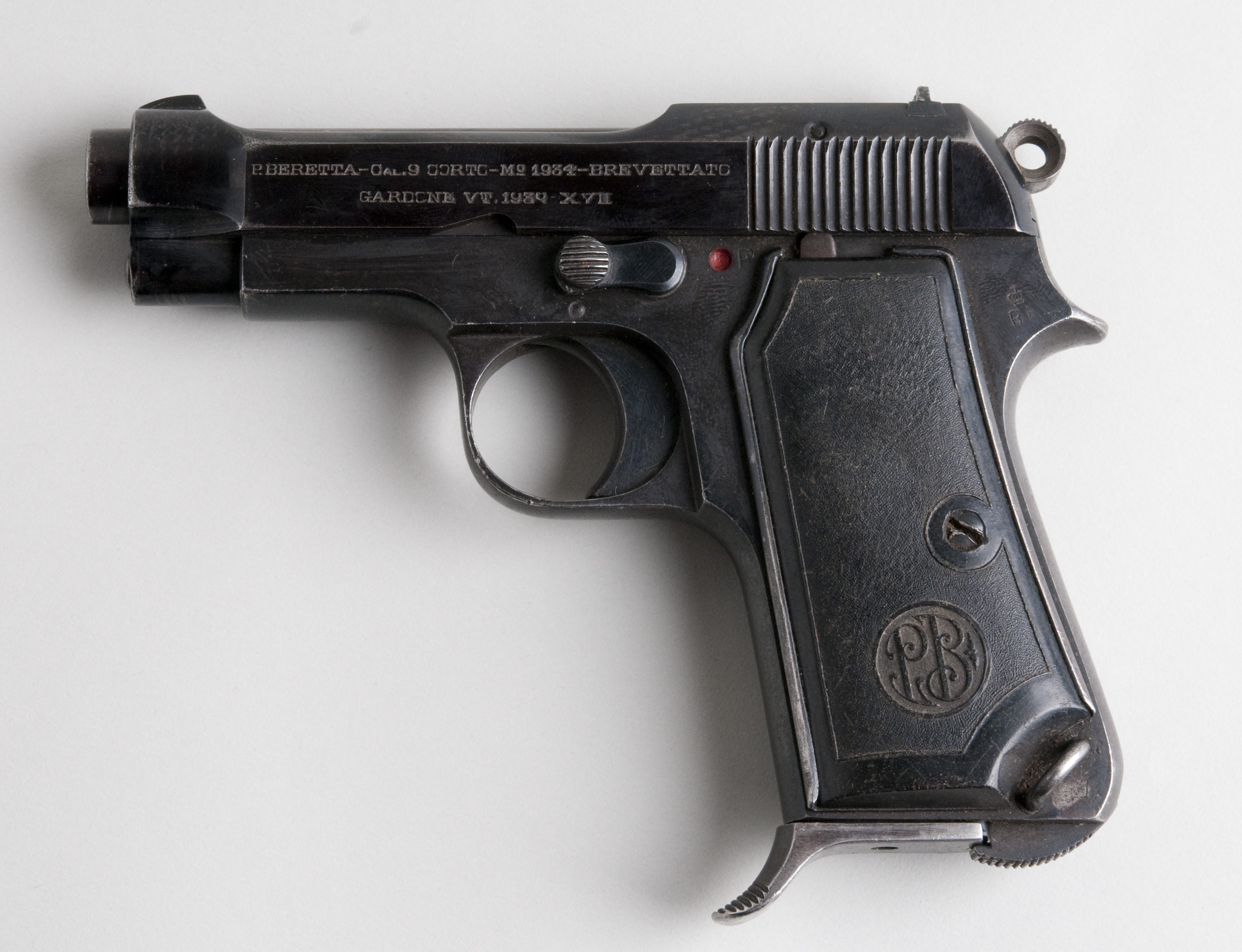
- Beretta M1934.
- Type: Semi-automatic pistol
- Place of origin: Kingdom of Italy

Service history
- In service: 1935–1991
- Used by: see users
- Wars: Second Italo-Abyssinian War; Spanish Civil War; World War II; Tuareg Rebellion (1990–1995)

Production history
- Manufacturer: Beretta
- Produced: 1934–1991
- No. built: 1,080,000

Specifications
- Mass: .763 kg (1.68 lb) (loaded); .697 kg (1.54 lb) (empty)
- Length: 15.2 cm (6.0 in)
- Barrel length: 8.9 cm (3.5 in)
- Cartridge: 9×17mm Corto (.380 ACP)
- Action: Blowback
- Rate of fire: 28 rounds per minute
- Muzzle velocity: 290 m/s (950 ft/s)
- Effective firing range: 40 m (130 ft)
- Feed system: 7-round detachable box magazine
- Sights: Fixed front blade and rear notch

The Beretta Model 1934 is an Italian compact, semi-automatic pistol which was issued as the service pistol of the Royal Italian Army beginning in 1934. As the standard sidearm of the Italian army it was issued to officers, NCOs and machine gun crews. It is chambered for the 9mm Corto, more commonly known as the .380 ACP.

== History and usage ==
Fabbrica d'Armi Pietro Beretta SpA of Gardone Val Trompia has a history in firearms manufacturing reaching back to 1526, when they were established as a maker of barrels. But it was not until 1915 that, responding to the needs of the military during World War I, they produced their first pistol, the model 1915. Beretta has become one of the world's largest pistol makers and the Beretta 1934 (M1934) was their most numerous product in the World War II era.

The mod. 34 was the final product of the mod. 1915 evolution, going through its 1919, 1923 and 1931 iterations. It was offered in .380 ACP, since it was a popular caliber among several European countries' armies, and since the Italian Army showed a specific interest in the German Walther PP pistols.

The first contract for the pistol was made by the Ministry of the Interior, that bought 5,000 units for the Italian Police.

The Italian Army adoption was delayed for another year since the commission for the adoption of the new standard pistol was interested in an extra safety on the frame, as the Walther PP used. Once the commission realised that the extra safety was redundant and increased the price per unit, they opted to adopt the gun as initially proposed by Beretta. The first batch of 150,000 units was delivered between 1937 and 1938, soon followed by several others.

This model was followed by the Beretta M1935, which was similar to the M1934 in most respects, except that it fired a .32 ACP (7.65 mm Browning) cartridge.

Pistols made during the Fascist Era are marked with their year of manufacture in two forms: the conventional Julian date in Arabic numerals and the date in the Fascist Era in Roman numerals. The Fascist calendar commenced on 28 October 1922, so a pistol from 1937 may carry either "XV" or "XVI" as its Fascist year. Pistols taken by the armed forces usually exhibit acceptance marks stamped into the frame on the left just above the grip: "RE" (Regio Esercito) for the army, "RM" (Regia Marina) for the navy, or "RA" (Regia Aeronautica) for the Air Force, in the form of an Eagle wearing a Royal Crown for the Royal Air Force. Police pistols may be marked "PS" (Pubblica Sicurezza). The Romanian military, at the time an Axis power, also purchased model 1934 (and 1935) pistols. The calibre marking appears as 9 mm Scurt (short in Romanian) rather than 9 mm Corto. Romanian Army M1934s differ from Italian M1934s in that the Romanian pistols use the Russian sight picture, where the Italian pistols use the standard sight picture used by Western armies.

An M1934, serial number 606824, was used by Nathuram Godse in the 1948 assassination of Mahatma Gandhi. The pistol, manufactured in 1937, was carried by an officer during Italy's invasion of Abyssinia and subsequently taken by a British officer as a war trophy. It is not known how it came to India, but Godse was given the unlicensed firearm by a co-conspirator.

== Design ==
Fitted with the characteristic Beretta open slide, the M1934 has a very reliable feeding and extraction cycle; the elongated slot in the top of the slide acts as the ejection port. It is made with relatively few parts and very simple to maintain. The M1934 is very robust in construction with a long service life if properly maintained.

9mm Corto (.380 ACP) is less powerful than most other military service pistol cartridges, such as 9mm Parabellum or .45 ACP. The magazine capacity is only 7 rounds. When the empty magazine is removed it no longer holds the slide back. The slide will come forward and close the gun unless it is held open by application of the safety, a separate operation, and this slows down the reloading of the pistol.

== Users ==
Romanian contract M1934 pistol

- Algeria
- Finland – 1,400 examples imported from Italy, used by home front troops from 1943.
- Nazi Germany – under designation Pistole 671(i)
- Kingdom of Italy – Royal Italian Army
- Italy − Widely used by Italian Army officers and the Polizia di Stato as late as 1988
- Libya
- Mali − People's Movement for the Liberation of Azawad
- Kingdom of Romania − Romanian Royal Army
- Yugoslav Partisans − captured pistols
- Yugoslavia − Yugoslav People's Army
- Nathuram Godse — used the pistol to assassinate Mohandas Gandhi on 30 January 1948.

== Production ==
From 1934 to 1992, about 1,080,000 units were produced globally.

== See also ==
- Beretta M1935
