= Make Room! Make Room! =

1966 novel by Harry Harrison

- Cover of 1967 Penguin UK paperback reissue, illustration by Alan Aldridge.
- Author: Harry Harrison
- Language: English
- Genre: Dystopian science fiction
- Publisher: Doubleday
- Publication date: November 2, 1966
- Publication place: United States
- Media type: Print (hardback & paperback) Electronic (ebook)
- Pages: 216

Make Room! Make Room! is a 1966 science fiction novel written by Harry Harrison exploring the consequences of both unchecked population growth on society and the hoarding of resources by a wealthy minority. It was originally serialized in Impulse magazine.

Set in 1999 from August until moments after New Year's Eve ends and the year 2000 begins, the novel explores trends in the proportion of world resources used by the United States and other countries compared to population growth, depicting a world where the global population is seven billion people, plagued with overcrowding, resource shortages and a crumbling infrastructure. The plot jumps from character to character, recounting the lives of people in various walks of life in New York City, population 35 million. (Note: Note that while none of the population predictions in the book came true by 2000, two out of the three were satisfied (in the real world) by the year 2025: the world human population surpassed 7 billion in the year 2010, and the United States population was over 345 million in 2025; in contrast, the population of New York City remained less than 10 million as of the end of 2025 (the entire surrounding metropolitan area had an estimated population below 20 million, as recently as 2022).)

The novel was the basis of the 1973 science fiction film Soylent Green, although the film changed much of the plot and theme and introduced cannibalism as a solution to feeding people.

== Plot summary ==
Make Room! Make Room! is set in an overpopulated New York City in 1999 (33 years after the time of first publication). Thirty-year-old Police Detective Andy Rusch lives in half a room, sharing it with Sol, a retired engineer who has adapted a bicycle to generate power for an old television set and a refrigerator.

When Andy lines up for their continually reducing water ration, he witnesses a public speech by the "Elders", older people forcibly retired from work. A riot breaks out after a nearby food shop has a surprise sale on "soylent" (soy and lentil) steaks. The shop is looted by the mob. Billy Chung, an 18-year-old Taiwanese-American, grabs a box of steaks. He eats some of them and sells the rest to raise enough money to land a job as a Western Union messenger boy. His first delivery takes him into a fortified apartment block, complete with the rare luxuries of air conditioning and running water for showers. He delivers his message to a rich racketeer named "Big Mike" O'Brien and sees Shirl, Mike's 23-year-old live-in mistress. Billy leaves the apartment but fixes it so he can get back into the building later. He breaks into Mike's place, but when Mike catches him in the act, Billy accidentally kills him and flees, empty-handed.

A piece of evidence may connect an out-of-town crime boss who may be trying to expand into New York City, a threat to Mike's associates. They see to it that Andy keeps working on the case, in addition to his regular duties.

During his investigation, Andy becomes enamored of Shirl. He ensures that she is permitted to stay in the apartment until the end of the month. During this month, they enjoy the luxuries. Afterwards, Shirl moves in with Andy. Shirl soon becomes disappointed with how little time the overworked Andy has for her. She eventually sleeps with a wealthy man she meets at a party.

To evade capture, Billy leaves the city, eventually breaking into the abandoned Brooklyn Navy Yard, where he comes to live with Peter, who is eagerly awaiting the new millennium as the end of the world. Soon they are attacked and displaced by a trio. They find a new home in a car. Months after the murder, Billy decides to visit his family, believing the police have lost interest in him.

Meanwhile, Sol decides he can no longer remain passive in the face of humanity's overpopulation crisis. He joins a march to protest the overturning of a legislative bill that supports population control. Sol is injured in a riot and catches pneumonia. A few days after his death, an obnoxious family takes over his living quarters, making Shirl and Andy's life much more miserable than before.

Andy stumbles upon Billy Chung, cornering him in his family's home. When Billy moves to attack Andy with a knife, he stumbles, and Andy accidentally shoots and kills him. The gangsters have lost interest by this point, but his superiors disavow Andy's actions, and he is temporarily demoted to ordinary patrolman. When he returns to his quarters, he finds Shirl has left him.

Andy is on patrol in Times Square on New Year's Eve, where he spots Shirl among rich party-goers. As the clock strikes midnight, Andy encounters Peter, who is distraught that the world has not ended and asks how life can continue as it is. The story concludes with the Times Square screen announcing that "Census says United States had biggest year ever, end-of-the-century, 344 million citizens."

== Concept and creation ==
Author Harry Harrison claimed, "The idea came from an Indian I met after the war, in 1946. He told me, 'Overpopulation is the big problem coming up in the world' (nobody had ever heard of it in those days) and he said, 'Want to make a lot of money, Harry? You have to import rubber contraceptives to India.' I didn't mind making money, but I didn't want to be the rubber king of India!"

== Short story ==
Several years after writing the novel, Harrison created the short story "Roommates" (1971), largely by joining excerpts from the novel. Harrison describes the impetus and creation of the short story in his introduction for it in The Best of Harry Harrison. He recounts how he was asked for an excerpt for reprinting, but that he did not think any simple excerpt stood alone. So he took various scenes from the "roommates" plot strand and combined them into the short story.
