= Peter Wyngarde =

British stage, screen, radio actor (c. 1926/1927–2018)

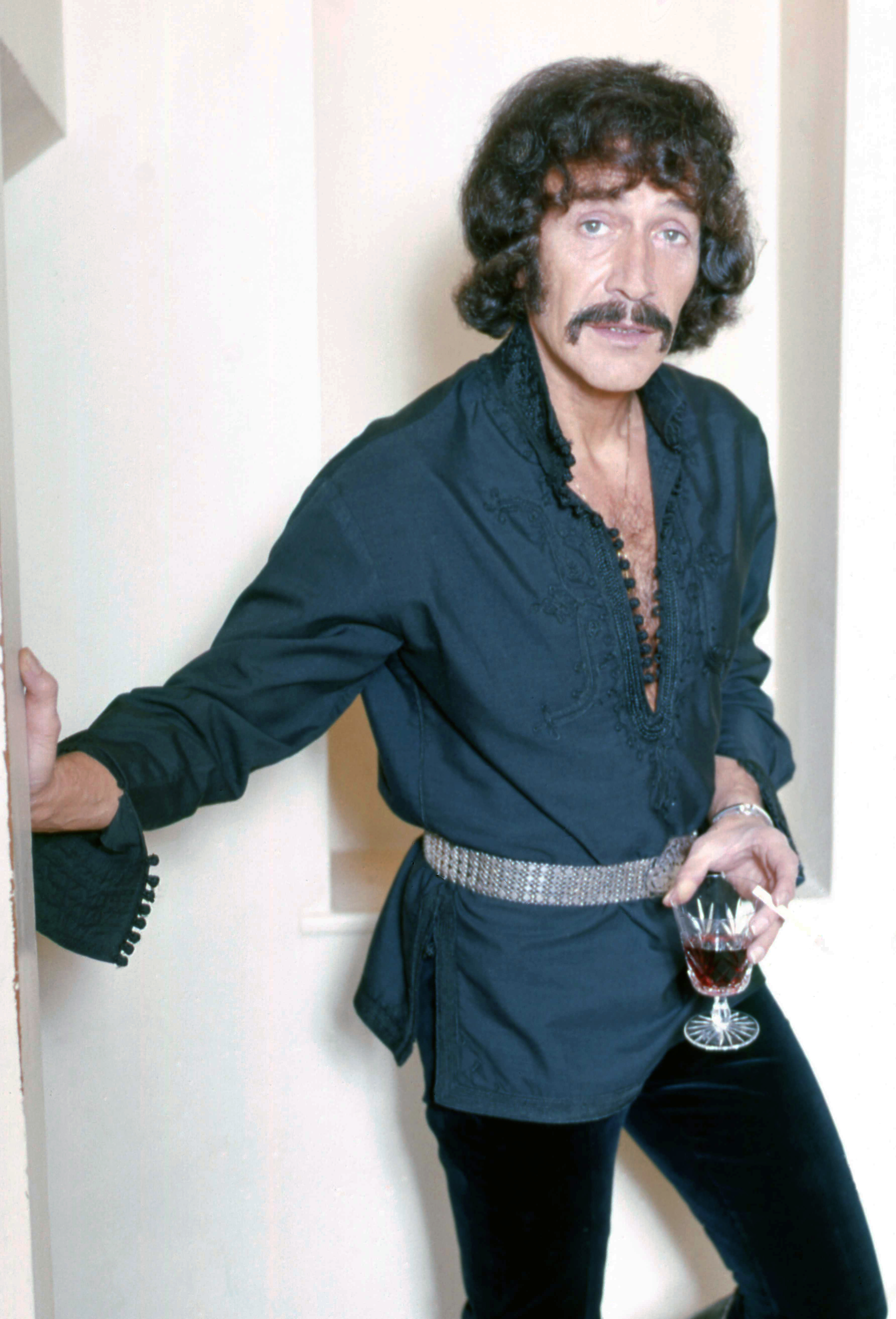
- Wyngarde in 1973
- Born: Cyril Goldbert c. 1926 or 1927 (disputed); Marseilles, France; or Singapore (disputed)
- Died: 15 January 2018 (aged 89 or 90); Chelsea, London, England
- Education: Western District Public School for Boys, Shanghai; Lunghua Academy
- Occupation: Actor
- Years active: 1946–2015
- Spouse: Dorinda Stevens (m. 1951; div. 1956)

Peter Paul Wyngarde (born Cyril Goldbert; circa 1926 or 1927 – 15 January 2018), until 1945 called Cyril Louis Goldbert, was a British actor who spent his early life in the Far East. He had a successful career on stage from the mid-1940s and slowly gained screen roles, especially in television in the 1950s and 1960s, before becoming well known for portraying the character of Jason King in the television series Department S (1969) and Jason King (1971). His acting career came to an end in the 1990s, but he had occasional appearances in the 21st century.

Wyngarde's flamboyant dress sense and stylish performances led to his becoming a style icon in Britain and elsewhere in the early 1970s. Various details of Wyngarde's early and personal life, including his place and date of birth, birth name, family and ethnic background, and sexual orientation, have been disputed.

== Background and early life ==
=== Name ===
Wyngarde's name as a child was Cyril Goldbert, and in reporting his death, BBC News gave his full name as Cyril Louis Goldbert.

=== Date and place of birth ===
By his own account, Wyngarde was born on 23 August 1933. However, in an interview in 1993 he said he did not know his age. On 14 December 1945, he arrived in England on the SS Arawa, and the ship's passenger list gives his age as 18, suggesting he was born before 15 December 1927. On official documents related to sea voyages in 1960, his date of birth was given as 28 August 1929 for a voyage into San Francisco, then as 27 July 1929 on the way home to England in October. In 2003, The Encyclopedia of British Film gave the year as 1927, and the registration of his death states his date of birth as 23 August 1927.

A biography published in 2020 which draws on personal knowledge of Wyngarde and on a large archive gives his date of birth as 28 (not 23) August 1928. Most official documents state the year as 1927 or 1929, while the more informal sources have reported a range between 1924 and 1937. (Note: When he was appearing in a BBC television play in 1950, a newspaper reported on 13 January that he was aged 25, so born before January 1925. J. G. Ballard writes in his Miracles of Life that "the future Peter Wyngarde ... was four years older than me..." Ballard was born in November 1930, so if he were correct it would mean that Wyngarde was born no later than November 1926. A list of the Internees of Lunghwa Camp made in Shanghai in 1943 says that Cyril Goldbert had been born about 1928, but not where. Wyngarde's appreciation society has given different dates: in 2016, while he was alive, it was saying 23 August 1933, and this date was used by BAFTA at its 2018 awards. After his death, the date was amended to 28 August 1937, and a photograph of a Bailiwick of Jersey passport issued on 1 August 1994 showing that date was published. In April 2019 it was amended again to 28 August 1928.)

After speaking to his mother in September 1956, The Straits Times said he was then aged 26.

Wyngarde was first included on an electoral register at Belsize, Hampstead, in 1948, which might support 1927 as his year of birth, as only those aged 21 and over were allowed to vote in the United Kingdom at that time.

Wyngarde's mother seems to have told The Straits Times that he was born in Marseilles, France, and Wyngarde said he was born at an aunt's home in Marseilles. His death registration states his birthplace as Singapore, and for the sea voyages in 1960 his place of birth was also stated as Singapore. In July 1972, he spent ninety minutes at Changi International Airport, Singapore, waiting for a connecting flight to Athens, and commented on this "I don't believe I have been to Singapore". Throughout his life, Wyngarde gave Marseilles as his place of birth, and this is the view taken by the biography published in 2020.

=== Family ===
Malaya about 1922, with the British Crown colony of the Straits Settlements coloured red

When Wyngarde travelled from Shanghai to Britain by sea in 1945, as Cyril Goldbert, the records of the ship, Arawa, name his next of kin as "Mr. H. Goldbert, c/o Ministry of Shipping, London", and the biography published in 2020 names him as Henry Goldbert. A citizen of the Russian Empire by birth, in October 1919 Goldbert was naturalized as a British subject in Singapore, with The Straits Times reporting that he had lived in the Straits Settlements for nineteen years. Born in 1897, his parents were Marco Goldbert and Rosa Klivger, and in April 1904 Mrs Goldbert took over the license of the Singapore Hotel in North Bridge Road. In 1910, her licence was moved to another address. In December 1906, Henry Goldbert won a school prize for "Scripture (Jews)", and in 1913 he was taking YMCA Engineering Classes and was about to sit for a Board of Education South Kensington certificate.

Wyngarde's mother was Marcheritta Marie Goldbert, born Ahin (1908–1992), known as Madge. In interviews, Wyngarde said she was French. There was a Eurasian family called Ahin living in Singapore. In 1947, she stated the name and nationality of her father as Andrew Nicolich Ahin, deceased, Swiss. She and Henry Goldbert were separated by 1937.

On 6 March 1929, The Straits Echo reported that Mr H. Goldbert was leaving his position as branch manager of the United Motor Works, Seremban, and that he and his wife were about to leave for Singapore on the night mail train.

In June 1934, in Singapore, a "V. Ahin", described as a young Eurasian mechanic and a brother of Mrs Golbert (sic), was fined fifteen Straits dollars for his behaviour in March in trying to stop the posting of a summons on his sister's door in Kim Yean Road. A Victor Ahin was noted in 1941 as a nephew of Mr P. A. Ahin, chief engineer in the dredging section of the Public Works Department.

Wyngarde had two younger Goldbert siblings: Adolphe Henry Peter Goldbert (1930–2011), and Marion Colette Simone Goldbert (1932–2012). In 1946, they also came by ship from Shanghai to England, arriving at Southampton on RMS Strathmore on 30 April 1946, aged sixteen and thirteen, both stating their destination as Prenton, Birkenhead. In England, Adolphe dropped his first name and was known as "Joe". Henry Goldbert was in England at the time and arranged for his younger children to be fostered by a family in Liverpool. He then set off for Bombay on the Franconia, intending to return to his life in the East. Wyngarde met his brother and sister after their arrival, but had little further contact with them or their children.

Henry Goldbert had an older brother, Cyril Arthur Goldbert, born in 1895 in Mykolaiv, now in Ukraine, who died in 1958 in Australia. A sea port of the Russian Empire, in the later 19th century about a fifth of Mykolaiv's population was Jewish, and although the community suffered a pogrom in 1899, the same was true in 1926. The surname Goldbert is rare, with only some 118 people worldwide known to be using it in 2025, almost half of them living in Israel. If Cyril and Henry Goldbert's family were Jewish, conversions to Christianity were then common in the Russian Empire, and Wyngarde's biographer reports that Henry Goldbert was a Roman Catholic.

Henry Goldbert sailed on the RMS Britannic from Port Said to Liverpool in August 1944, giving his age as 47 and his occupation as Marine Engineer, then some months later from Manchester to New York City, arriving there in May 1945. Social security records in the United States give his date of birth as 1897 and his birthplace as "Hicolieff", Soviet Union, and name his parents. At the time of the 1950 United States census, Henry Goldbert was living in San Francisco, California, with his much older sister Esther Reggoch, both giving their native land as "Russia", and was the owner of a barber shop. His age was given as 53, and he stated his marital status as "separated". Esther Risoff Goldbert had been naturalized as a US citizen in California in 1938. Perhaps coincidentally, Wyngarde visited San Francisco in July 1960.

Wyngarde said that Henry Goldbert was one of his three stepfathers, and that his father was an Englishman named Henry Wyngarde, whose career in the British Diplomatic Service was in Hong Kong, Malaya, Singapore, and India, before he became an importer and exporter of antique watches living in Eaton Square, London. No such person has been traced in public records. The biography of 2020 says Henry and Madge Goldbert had a business buying and selling antique watches in Shanghai in the 1930s, that they divorced in 1937, and that Wyngarde's mother soon married Charles Leo Juvet and had a son called Paul Edouard Juvet, born in 1938. There was a Swiss horological family called Juvet based in Shanghai. It was first reported in April 1950 that Wyngarde was a maternal nephew of the French actor-director Louis Jouvet, and this was still being written about twenty years later. Evidence that his mother was a sister or sister-in-law of Louis Jouvet is lacking, and Jouvet appears to be unrelated to the Swiss Juvet family. However, when Paul Edouard Juvet died at Geneva in 1998, Wyngarde is reported to have taken responsibility for settling his affairs and paying for his funeral.

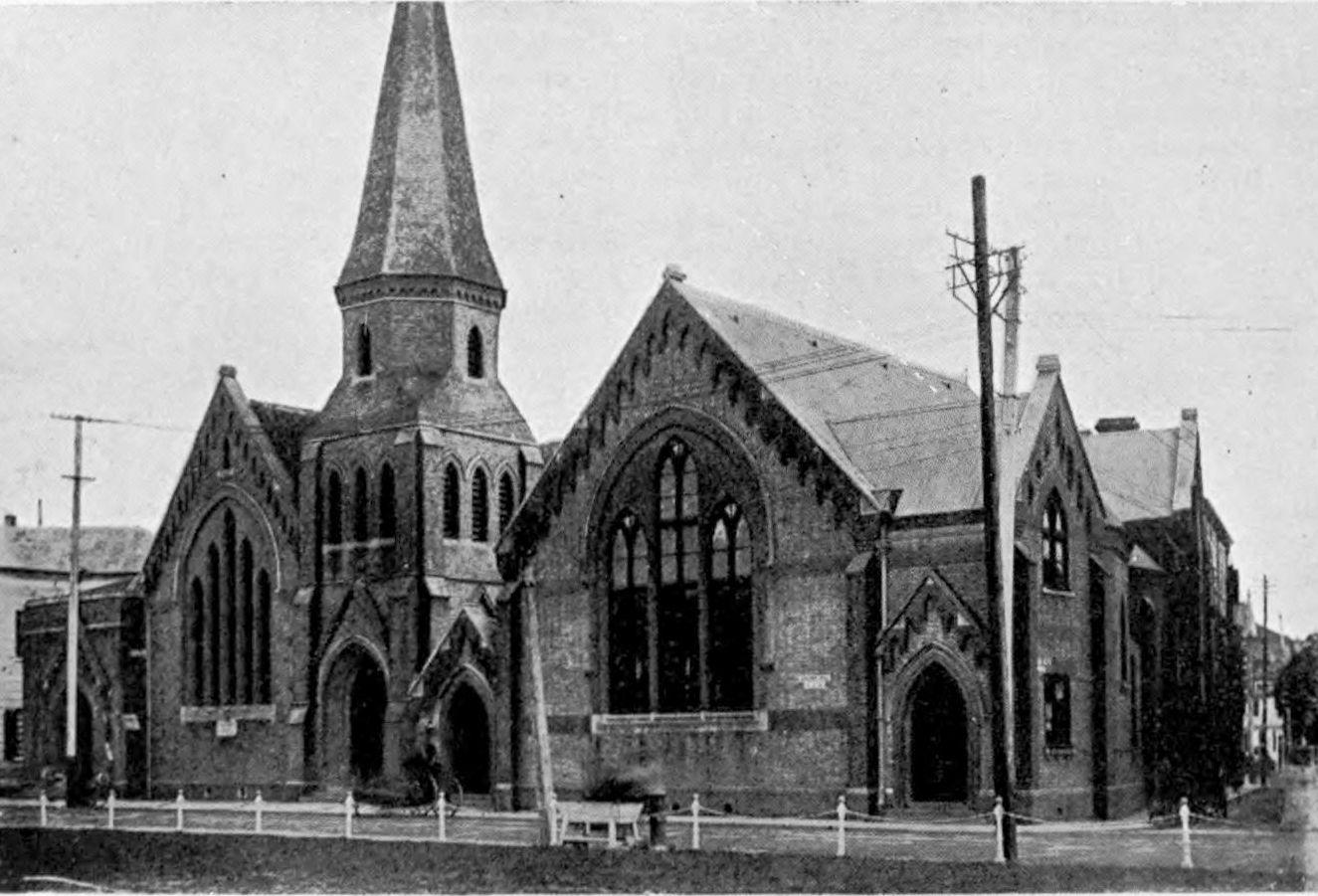
The Union Church, Shanghai, about 1938

On 10 December 1947, at the Union Church on the Bund in Shanghai, under the name of Marcheritta M. Goldbert, Wyngarde's mother married John MacAulay, known as Ian, giving the name of her father. After his mother's marriage, Wyngarde sometimes used his new stepfather's surname.

The MacAulays lived in the Sultanate of Johor, Malaya, until Ian MacAulay retired, and in 1956 were living 140 miles from Singapore. On their retirement to Britain, they settled near MacAulay's home town of Stornoway, in Scotland. Wyngarde's mother died in 1992, aged 84, and was buried on the Isle of Lewis.

In 1952, Wyngarde's brother was married in the Church of England, at All Saints Church, Tudeley, as Henry. A. P. Goldbert. He was then serving in the Royal Navy and was described in a local newspaper as "second son of Mr and Mrs H. Goldbert of Kuala Lumpur Malaya". He died at the age of 81 in 2011.

=== Early life ===
Wyngarde's mother told The Straits Times in 1956 that her son had spent "his first few years" in Malaya. He later claimed to have been speaking both Russian and French fluently at the age of five.

Wyngarde often spoke about having had a traumatic early life. In 2012, he wrote to his sister-in-law Lillian Goldbert "From early childhood we had to fend for ourselves." He told an interviewer that after his parents' divorce, his father took him to China "only months before war with China broke out" in the summer of 1937. He spoke about living in Shanghai when the Japanese Army took over the Shanghai International Settlement on 8 December 1941. Correspondence between 1942 and 1943 held in the National Archives shows that in 1943 Henry Goldbert was serving on SS Lyemoon, that his three children, including 15-year-old Cyril, were then living in Shanghai, that efforts were being made by the British Ministry of War Transport, the Prisoners of War Department, and various boarding schools, to repatriate the children to Britain, and that Cyril could not be accommodated because of his age.

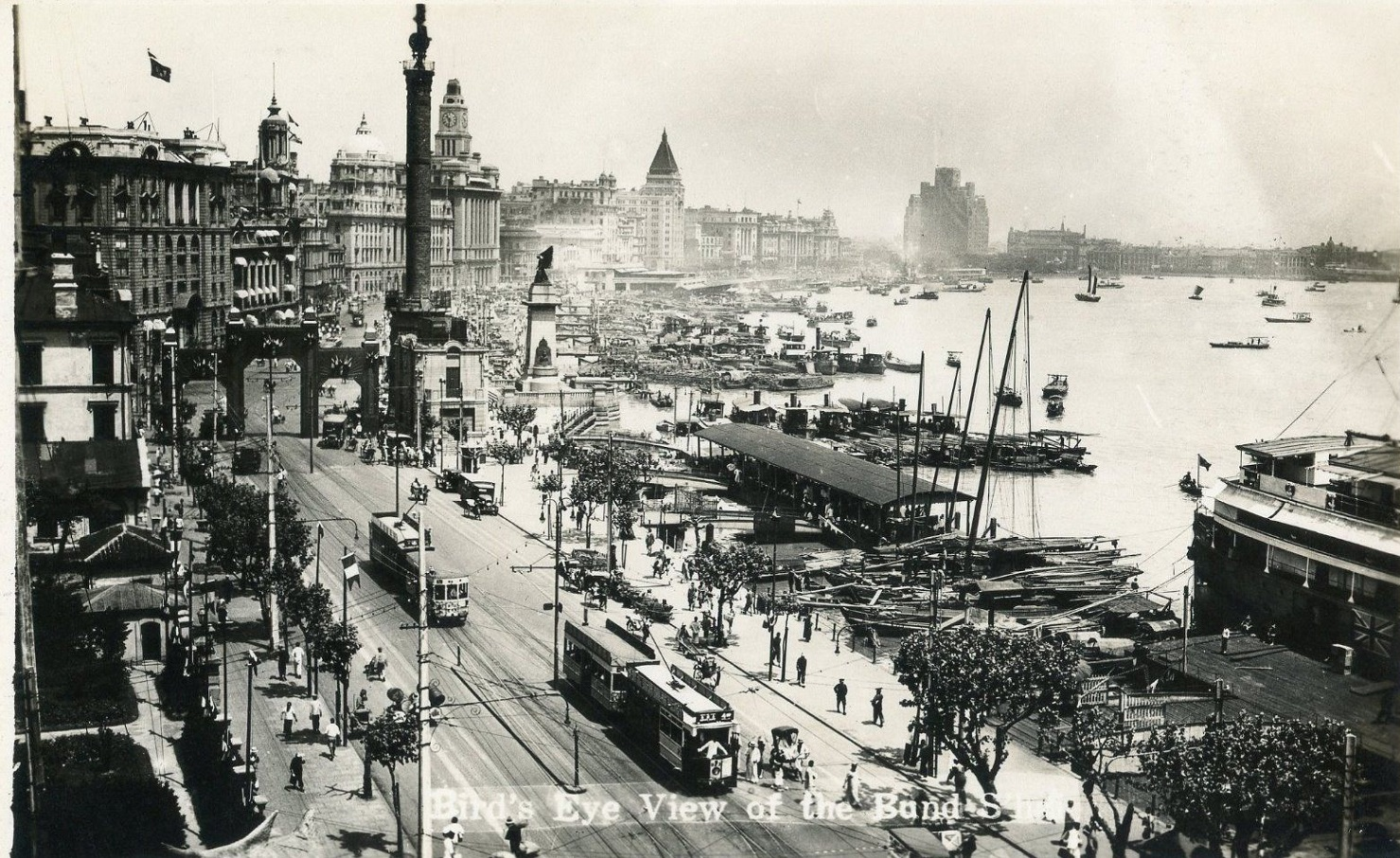
A view of the Bund, Shanghai, about 1930

Before internment, Wyngarde was educated at the Western District Public School for Boys in Yuyuan Road, Shanghai, where after the arrival of the Japanese there were compulsory lessons in Japanese. Yuyuan Road was within the Shanghai French Concession.

In April 1943, Wyngarde was interned in the Lunghua Civilian Assembly Centre. There were some 300 children in the camp, who continued their education at a school called the Lunghua Academy. This had "a full-scale syllabus which met the requirements of the then School Certificate" and taught maths, French, English, Latin, history, and general science. Outside the classroom, there were football, hockey, and softball, plus concerts and dances. J. G. Ballard was also there and travelled to Britain in 1945 with Wyngarde and other former internees. He later wrote of this period

Separated from his parents, he lived with another family in G Block, and amused everyone with his fey and extravagant manner. Theatre was his entire world, and he played adult roles in the camp Shakespeare productions, completely dominating the bank managers and company directors who struggled to keep up with him. He was four years older than me, and very witty company, with a sophisticated patter I had rarely come across... I once strolled with Cyril through some ruined buildings on the outskirts of the camp, listening to him set out his plans for his conquest of the West End.

Ballard also claimed Wyngarde had told him he was planning to use the stage name of Laurence Templeton. For some years Wyngarde denied knowing Ballard or said he could not remember him, but in an undated letter published by his biographer in 2020 he said he had "pinned down" Ballard as a boy he had known in the camp who at the time was called Bryant.

In one interview in the 1970s, Wyngarde said he was interned as an unaccompanied five-year-old, due to an administrative error, but this appears to be part of a scheme to lower his age, since the records show that he was interned from the age of fifteen to just before his 18th birthday. He began acting during his internment, when he played all the characters in a version of Doctor Jekyll and Mr Hyde.

Interviewed by Ray Connolly in 1973, Wyngarde said: "As a child it was difficult to differentiate sometimes between fact and fantasy".

Following the Surrender of Japan, the internment camps were liberated in August 1945. Cyril Goldbert left Shanghai that autumn and travelled to England on the Cunard-White Star Line ship Arawa. Passenger records show that he travelled alone, aged eighteen, and arrived in Southampton on 14 December 1945. He later said that the ship had arrived in Liverpool and that it was greeted by King George VI.

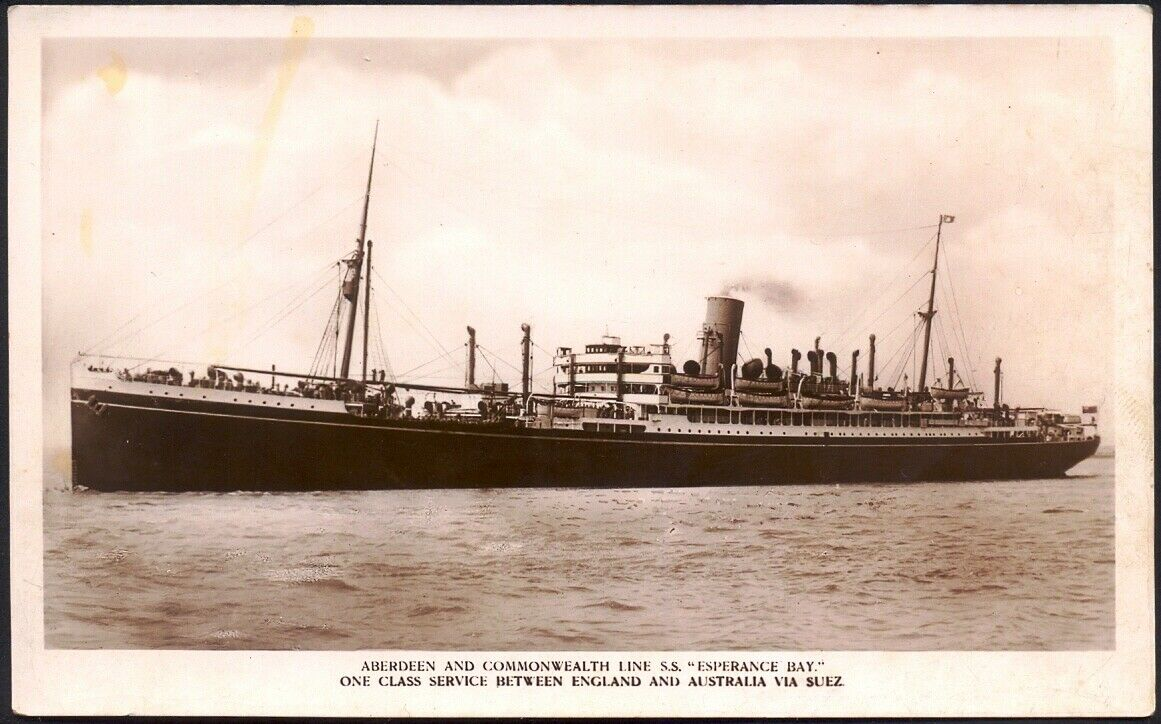
SS Arawa, formerly Esperance Bay

The Guardian newspaper said of Wyngarde in March 2020 that "his life story is shrouded in mystery". His own accounts of his life after leaving Shanghai for England appear to have been embellished with a history of medical treatment and education. This helped to account for the six-year gap created by his claim to have been a 12-year-old boy when he left Shanghai, rather than a man of eighteen. He said he had spent two years in a Swiss sanatorium, recovering from his war experiences. He was always vague about his education, but hinted that he had attended schools in Switzerland, France, and England, after which he had briefly studied law at Oxford and had worked in a London advertising agency for a while, before starting work as a professional actor.

== Career ==
=== Early stage career ===
Within a few months of his arrival in England in December 1945, Wyngarde began his professional acting career, beginning to use the name of Peter Wyngarde. He first appeared on stage at the Buxton Playhouse in June 1946, playing Ensign Blades in Quality Street. The theatre had just re-opened after being closed for six months. Soon after that it presented J. B. Priestley's When We Are Married, and in July 1946 Wyngarde appeared in this at the Embassy Theatre, Hampstead, playing Gerald Forbes. In the later months of 1946, he was on tour in a play called Pickup Girl, playing three parts.

In April 1947, Wyngarde was reported to be a newcomer to the Nottingham Playhouse theatre company, "and an asset... responsible for much good fun". Towards the end of that year, he had the role of Morris Dixon in a production of Noël Coward's Present Laughter at the Theatre Royal, Birmingham.

In May and June 1949, Wyngarde was back at the Embassy Theatre, playing Cassio in a new Nottingham Playhouse production of Othello, with Michael Aldridge as Othello and Rosalind Boxall as Desdemona. The Stage commented "Cassio is obviously a good fellow, not particularly quick-witted, but as trusting and open as his dusky master. Peter Wyngarde invests him with gaiety and sincerity."

Wyngarde appeared in While the Sun Shines at the Richmond Theatre, Richmond-upon-Thames, in December 1949, playing a French officer.

In January 1950, the Essex Newsman reported that he was a former member of the Colchester Repertory company. The same month, a new theatre company was formed at the Richmond Theatre, with Oliver Gordon as resident producer, the members including Martin Wyldeck, Raymond Francis, and Wyngarde. In February, at Richmond, Wyngarde was in They Knew What They Wanted, and in March in Mountain Air.

In February 1951, as part of the Festival of Britain, Wyngarde appeared in Hamlet at the New Theatre, Bromley, playing Voltimand.

In May 1952, he was back at the New Theatre, Bromley, appearing in a play called Separate Rooms, when on 6 May he was taken ill with an attack of malaria at Charing Cross Station while on his way to the theatre. In June, he was at the Irving Theatre playing Jonah, the commander of an Israeli platoon surrounded by a minefield, in Natan Shaham's They'll Arrive To-morrow. This was the first Israeli play to be presented in London. The reviewer of The Times said "Mr Peter Wyngarde, as the commanding officer, makes perhaps the strongest impression."

In April 1954, Wyngarde played the Ghost in an Arts Theatre production of The Enchanted by Giraudoux. In September 1954 he was at the Arts Theatre playing the Bastard of Orleans in George Bernard Shaw's Saint Joan, with Siobhán McKenna and Kenneth Williams.

On 24 April 1958, Wyngarde opened at the Apollo Theatre playing Count Marcellus in Duel of Angels with Vivien Leigh. In the first half of 1959, he had a season at the Bristol Old Vic which he considered a highlight of his career. He appeared as Petruchio in The Taming of the Shrew from 24 February to 14 March, then produced and directed the Eugene O'Neill play Long Day's Journey into Night, which ran from 17 March to 7 April, and finally from 19 May to 6 June 1959 played the title role in Cyrano de Bergerac.

In the spring of 1960, a Duel of Angels production was put together for the United States, with a new cast, apart from Leigh and Wyngarde. This opened at the Helen Hayes Theatre on Broadway and had a run there from 19 April to 1 June. Wyngarde toured the US with the play and won both the San Francisco Award for Best Actor in a Foreign Play and a Tony Award for Most Promising Newcomer. He returned to Britain in October.

In March 1963, Wyngarde had top billing as Werner Loder, a German newspaper publisher, in Night Conspirators, a play by Robert Muller about the return of Hitler from hiding. Cyril Luckham played an archbishop and Ronald Leigh-Hunt an ambassador, but Hitler did not appear on stage. This had a run at the Saville Theatre and a tour. The play had been presented for the first time on ITV's Armchair Theatre in May 1962, with Wyngarde in the same part and The Stage calling it "powerful and horribly plausible".

In 1968, Wyngarde had the part of Nikolay in The Duel, a play by John Holton Dell based on the novella by Chekhov, with Nyree Dawn Porter as Nadya. A tour of this production was launched at the Theatre Royal, Brighton, on 18 March.

=== Early television career ===
In 1950, when few people in England had televisions, Wyngarde began to appear in television plays and series. The number of British "television households" was then reported as 344,000, but by 1955 it was said to be 4,500,000, and it went on shooting up.

Wyngarde's first credited screen role appears to have come in a BBC Sunday Night Theatre play called "The Rope", broadcast in January 1950, playing Charles Granillo. He and a friend played by David Markham strangle a young man, hide his body in their flat, then invite his friends and family to a party to complete the perfection of the murder.

In June 1954, he had the lead part of Fritz Lobheimer in a BBC production of Liebelei, directed by Rudolph Cartier, opposite Jeanette Sterke. This was the first full-length play by Arthur Schnitzler to be televised in Britain.

For his role as John the Baptist in the first episode of Jesus of Nazareth (February 1956), Wyngarde travelled to the Holy Land and baptized Jesus (played by Tom Fleming) in the River Jordan.

Soon after the launch of ITV, Wyngarde appeared on ITV Television Playhouse on 20 December 1956, playing a British Army officer in the play The Bridge by Joseph Schail, with Ingeborg Wells.

He is said to have first become a "heart-throb" in 1957, in a BBC television adaptation of A Tale of Two Cities, playing Sydney Carton. In March, he was Hovstad in a Play of the Week called "An Enemy of the People", in which a scientist played by John Robinson finds a medicinal spa is polluted, and the town fights him. Jill Dixon was Petra. In August, he guest-starred in Overseas Press Club - Exclusive! in an episode about the killing of George Polk, playing a Greek, Andrea Bakolas. In December, in another Television Playhouse, "Love Her to Death", he was a young man unhappily married to a rich older woman who despises him, played by Jean Kent.

In January 1958, Wyngarde was in a production for television of The Dark Is Light Enough, by Christopher Fry, with Dame Edith Evans in the part of Countess Ostenburg, which had been written for her. The same month, he had the lead part of David Linden in an Armchair Theatre version of The Shining Hour, opposite Diana Fairfax and Angela Baddeley.

Beginning in May 1958, Wyngarde appeared as Long John Silver in a six-episode BBC serial of The Adventures of Ben Gunn, with Rupert Davies playing Captain Flint. The Kentish Independent found that "one of the smoothest, most sophisticated actors of to-day" had found a new angle on the part of Silver.

In 1959, Wyngarde had a leading role as Jan Wicziewsky in Julien Green's South on Granada TV, thought to be the earliest television play with an openly homosexual theme. The Lord Chamberlain had banned the play when it was about to be staged in London in 1955. A review in The Stage said "Peter Wyngarde as Jan... gave a stunningly brilliant performance, controlled and delicately pitched.

In November 1959, Wyngarde played Isambard Kingdom Brunel in a television documentary about him, Engineer Extraordinary. He commented

I jumped at the chance to play Brunel because he is such a wonderful person, a really big personality. He crowded into his life the adventures of a dozen lives, and the achievements of a score of men.

In 1960, Wyngarde was Roger Casement in the first episode of Granada Television's On Trial series, produced by Peter Wildeblood, and commented that "very little make-up was needed for the part... I am exactly Casement."

In April 1962, Wyngarde appeared in a BBC Sunday-Night Play staging of John Galsworthy's "Loyalties", which is about anti-semitism. He was Ferdinand de Levis, a Jew, who accuses Captain Dancy, a war hero played by Keith Michell, of stealing £1,000 from him. In July, in an Out of This World episode, he played the captain of a space ship who is ordered to jettison a young stowaway, played by Jane Asher, into space, and reluctantly obeys the order.

In April 1964, Wyngarde had the title role in Rupert of Hentzau on BBC1, with George Baker as Rudolf Rassendyll and Barbara Shelley as Queen Flavia.

In a Play of the Week production of A Midsummer Night's Dream for ITV, directed by Joan Kemp-Welch and broadcast on Midsummer's Eve in June 1964, Wyngarde took the part of Oberon, king of the fairies, with Anna Massey as his Titania, Benny Hill as Bottom, and Alfie Bass as Fluke. A few months later, in another Play of the Week, Luigi Pirandello's The Rules of the Game, Wyngarde starred with Anthony Quayle and Gwen Watford.

In 1966, Wyngarde appeared in an episode of The Saint, "The Man Who Liked Lions", playing Tiberio, an assassin obsessed with lions. At the end, Tiberio and Simon Templar fight a duel in Roman costume, and Tiberio meets a sticky end, savaged by his own lion. Also in 1966, he appeared with Diana Rigg and Patrick Macnee in The Avengers episode "A Touch of Brimstone", as Cartney, leader of a recreation of the Hellfire Club. In 1967, he returned as Stewart Kirby in another episode, "Epic".

He also guest-starred in The Baron and in the American show I Spy.

In 1967, Wyngarde appeared in The Prisoner, in "Checkmate", as the authority-figure called Number Two. In June came another appearance with Roger Moore in The Saint: "The Gadic Connection" and in September he was Konrad von Kroll in the Love Story episode "It's a Long Way to Transylvania", with The Stage complaining that "Peter hides his handsome features behind a variety of gruesome masks" and TV Times reporting that Wyngarde was "delighted with his part as a spine-chilling werewolf with a taste for redblooded young ladies." Then in an episode of The Troubleshooters broadcast in November, he played a desert oil sheikh who tries to buy a white girl when negotiating oil rights.

In The Champions: "The Invisible Man" (1968), Wyngarde is a senior doctor gone to the bad who has invented an "invisible man" device which can control people. He uses it to force Sir Frederick Howard (Basil Dignam) to steal gold bullion worth ten million pounds from the Bank of England for him.

=== Early films ===
After making his film debut in an uncredited minor role as a soldier in Dick Barton Strikes Back (1949), Wyngarde gained attention for his occasional appearances in feature films.

He took the role of Pausanias opposite Richard Burton in the film Alexander the Great (1956), and with Donald Sinden had a major role in the film The Siege of Sidney Street (1960), in which he "seethed anarchist fury".

Wyngarde played the Marquis des Grieux in a TV play made from Dostoevsky's The Gambler, about the tables of Roulettenberg, first shown in August 1956.

In the BBC-TV play The Widows of Jaffa (June 1957), Wyngarde plays an Arab interpreter with divided loyalties, in a story about a Gaza Strip refugee camp written by Evan Jones. In a second play for the BBC the same year, Ordeal by Fire, directed by Rudolph Cartier, Wyngarde plays a scholar, Jerome Taillard, in a tale of 15th-century France, with Elizabeth Sellars playing a new Joan of Arc, after the death of the first by burning at the stake. (This film is not, as claimed by IMDb, about forest fires in North America.)

In Jack Clayton's The Innocents (1961), Wyngarde had non-speaking scenes as the leering Peter Quint, with Deborah Kerr and Pamela Franklin. He followed this by starring in the occult thriller Night of the Eagle (1962), a rare film appearance in a lead role. The New York Times called the movie "quite the most effective 'supernatural' thriller since Village of the Damned".

In Lucy in London (1966), a US television movie starring Lucille Ball, her character, Lucy, finds herself appearing in The Taming of the Shrew as Kate, and Wyngarde plays himself, appearing as a Shakespearean actor playing the part of Petruchio.

=== Radio ===
Wyngarde played the journalist Nigel Bathgate on the BBC Light Programme, in a five-part dramatization of Ngaio Marsh's Artists in Crime, broadcast in August and September 1953, with Mavis Villiers as Bobbie O'Dawne.

In August 1954, he starred with Dorothy Gordon in a BBC Radio production of Jean Anouilh's Léocadia, playing Prince Albert Troubiscoi, who is in love with an opera singer, Léocadia. In April 1955, he again starred in an Anouilh play on BBC radio, this time voicing the part of Frantz in The Ermine. He spoke the part of Orestes in the Oresteia of Aeschylus for the Third Programme, first broadcast in three parts on 27 May 1956, with Howard Marion-Crawford playing Agamemnon.

In February 1957, again on the Third Programme, Wyngarde was the narrator for a BBC Drama Repertory Company performance of Anton Chekhov's Uncle Vanya. In September, he had the title role of Sir Willoughby Patterne in BBC Radio's dramatization of George Meredith's novel The Egoist.

Wyngarde returned to radio in January 1967, in a broadcast of Terence Rattigan's The Sleeping Prince on the Home Service, with Millicent Martin and Fay Compton.

=== Jason King ===
Wyngarde as Jason King

Wyngarde became a British household name through his starring role in the spy-fi series Department S (1969–1970). His character, Jason King, a novelist and detective, was reputedly based on the author Ian Fleming. Department S, a fictional division of Interpol based in Paris, dealt only with "inexplicable and baffling" cases and was masterminded by Sir Curtis Seretse, supported by a former CIA agent, Stewart Sullivan, a computer expert, Annabelle Hurst, and King. Wyngarde persuaded the producers to model King on him, with the result that King led a hedonistic lifestyle in Paris, dressed decadently, and drove a Bentley S2 Continental sports saloon. Wyngarde commented many years later "I decided Jason King was going to be an extension of me". He noted that his hair was long at the time because he had just been appearing in a Chekhov play, The Duel, and added in another interview that "Jason King had champagne and strawberries for breakfast, just as I did myself."

As early as 1964, Wyngarde was complaining that glamorous dressing gowns for men must have gone out of fashion, as they were so difficult for his wardrobe master to find.

With its "peculiarly British humour", Department S failed to sell to a United States network, which was then the touchstone for any ITC production, and only one series was made, but after the show ended, the character of Jason King was spun off into a new action series called Jason King (1971–1972). The managing director of ITC, Lew Grade, told Wyngarde

"You, with your funny dark hair, moustache and terrible clothes, are not my idea of a hero at all, but my wife loves you, so you have to do another series."

One obituary described Wyngarde as playing the role "in the manner of a cat walking on tiptoe, with an air of self-satisfaction". The kinder assessment of National Review was that Jason King was a "self-caricature" of Wyngarde, and summed him up:

King was a best-selling crime writer, ladies' man, charismatic, eccentric, flamboyant, witty, ingenious. His moustache was dramatic. His tailoring was epic. His boots were snakeskin, his dressing gowns silk, his foulards silk, his cravats silk, his voice silk. His coats were sweeping, his caftans evoked decadence in Tangier, rather than a grubby pilgrimage along the hippie trail, and his tight leather outfit was worn with obvious and unashamed delight.

The Independent said of Wyngarde's Jason King that

He was frilly and flared in every way, like the Dr Who of the era, Jon Pertwee, another fully frilly and flared telly hero. He might as well have come from another planet, a sci-fi show such as Space: 1999 or The Tomorrow People... No TV personality rivalled Jason King for sheer insouciant, arch, camp style.

The two television shows turned Wyngarde into an international celebrity, and he was mobbed by female fans on a visit to Australia. Carl Gresham, his promotional events manager at the time, said later that "During the '70s we had a contract to officially open over thirty Woolworths newly refurbished stores throughout the UK." He added that other than Morecambe and Wise, who were also among his clients, Wyngarde was "the most requested and highest paid celebrity" making such personal appearances.

In the role of King, the Glasgow Herald reported that Wyngarde "became a style icon, with his droopy moustache, hair that looked like a bearskin hat, and a wardrobe of wide-lapelled, three-piece suits, cravats and open-necked shirts in colours so bright they might hurt sensitive eyes." In the summer of 1970, he won the John Stephen Fashion Award for Best Dressed Personality, given by Radio Luxembourg and decided by its listeners and by readers of Fab 208 magazine. Other nominees for the award included Cliff Richard and George Best, but they were far behind in the voting. At least one boy was given the names "Jason Wyngarde".

The Jason King show ran for one series of 26 fifty-minute episodes. More lightweight than Department S and more cheaply made, in Simon Heffer's assessment "Jason King saw Wyngarde become an ever-more comic turn." By 1972, Wyngarde had tired of playing this "blasé idiot".

=== Later career ===
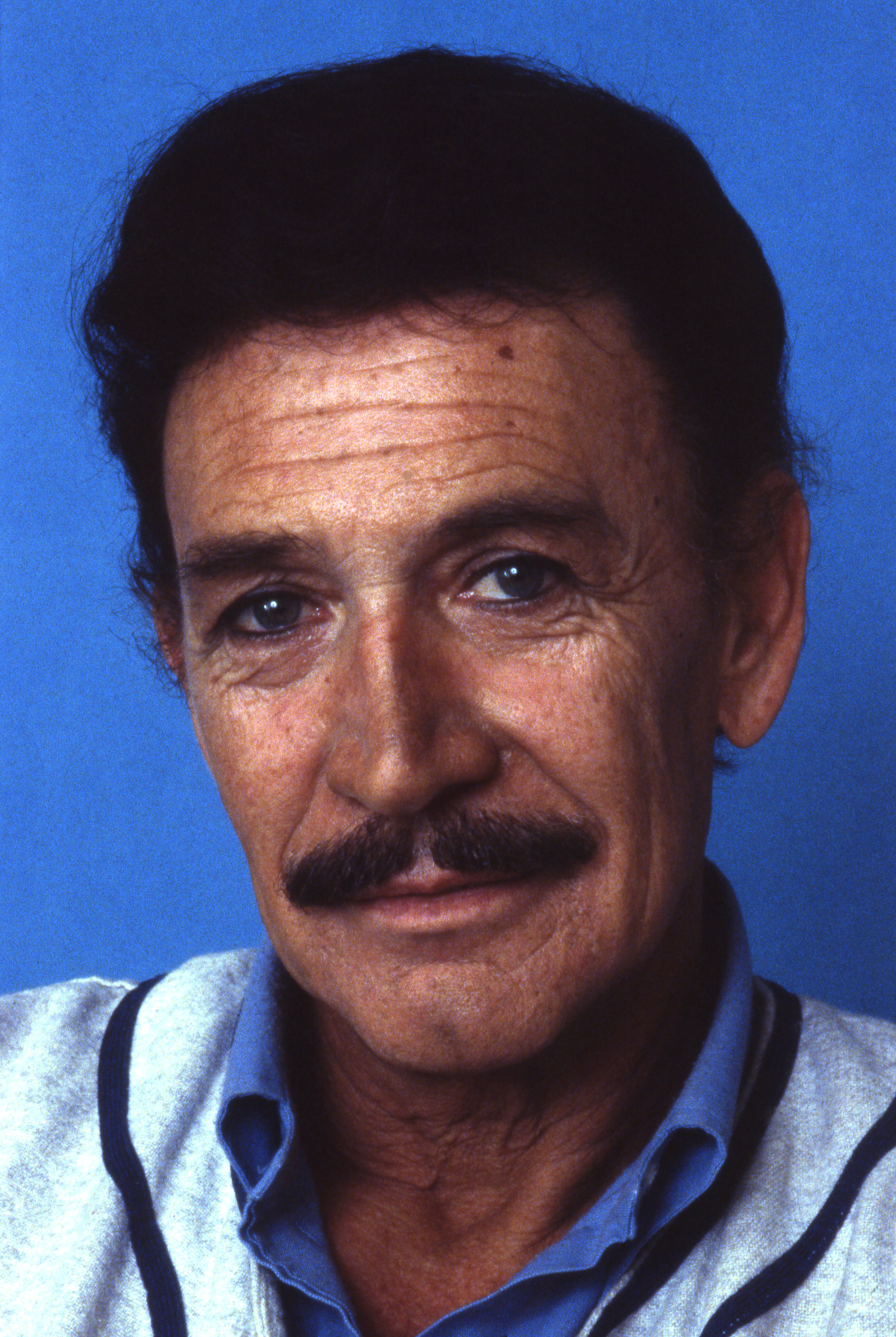
Wyngarde in 1981

In May 1972, Wyngarde was on stage at the Metro, Bourke Street, Melbourne, playing the title role in the first Australian production of Simon Gray's Butley. His performance got glowing reviews, and on 1 June The Stage reported that he had "scored a big hit", but nevertheless the play had a shorter run than was hoped.

With Stanley Baker, Max Bygraves, Dickie Henderson, Cliff Michelmore, and Ron Moody, Wyngarde took part in a fund-raising lunch on 24 November 1972 to gather donations for children's charities.

On 5 January 1973, Wyngarde, Rolf Harris, and Katie Boyle were the judges in a television contest staged in Liverpool called "Miss TV Europe", which was won by Sylvia Kristel. Wyngarde chaired the panel and presented the prizes. From 22 January, he was back on stage, appearing for a week at the Royal Shakespeare Theatre, Stratford-upon-Avon, in Mother Adam by Charles Dyer, playing Adam, a middle-aged museum attendant living with his crippled mother, played by Hermione Baddeley. At the end of January, this play went on tour, going next to the Playhouse, Weston-super-Mare, and then in February on to Glasgow. The Scotsman commented drily that "Peter Wyngarde has another try at breaking away from his image".

In the early 1970s, under the name of John Macaulay, Wyngarde wrote a play, Chameleons, later renamed as Boy.

Wyngarde had said in 1972 that he had a "great wish to do a musical". On 21 June 1973, a front-page story in The Stage announced a major tour of a revival of the musical The King and I, with Wyngarde playing the King of Siam and Sally Ann Howes in the part of Anna. This show was launched at the Forum Theatre, Billingham, at the end of June, and for a publicity stunt Wyngarde and Howes sailed up the River Thames and under Tower Bridge in a Chinese junk, in costume. The show went to Birmingham, Glasgow, Hull, Leeds, Manchester, and Nottingham, and arrived at the Adelphi Theatre in the West End on 10 October 1973. It ran until 25 May 1974, clocking up a total of 260 performances.

Between January 1975 and the summer of that year, Wyngarde toured in the title role of Bram Stoker's Dracula, once again beginning at Billingham. The Hartlepool Northern Daily Mail noted that "COUNT DRACULA has risen from the grave once again to visit Billingham, but the intrepid Count will be a week late in arriving. The Count is making his bid for stardom on the stage of Billingham Forum Theatre later this month." Wyngarde later claimed that "My problem is that women fall in love with Jason King, but then find that I'm really Dracula".

Wyngarde's career suffered a setback from the publicity surrounding a conviction on 16 October 1975 for "gross indecency", and never fully recovered. In 2008, the Irish Independent stated the outcome was that "his career was terminated in 1975".

From the end of September to 15 November 1975, at the Yvonne Arnaud Theatre, Guildford, and on tour, he directed a revival of Present Laughter and also played the part of Essendine, which Noël Coward had written for himself. Then in December, at the same theatre, he directed Time and the Conways. Soon after, from February to March 1976, he toured in The Merchant of Venice, both directing the play and appearing in it as Shylock. Near the end of the run, at the Spa Theatre, Bridlington, he was given a civic reception by the Mayor.

Between June and September 1976, Wyngarde toured in Anastasia, a play by Guy Bolton based on a work by Marcelle Maurette. It then had a run at the Cambridge Theatre in the West End from 22 September to October 1976. Wyngarde played Prince Bounine, who plots to gain millions from the inheritance of the Grand Duchess Anastasia by means of a lookalike. Nyree Dawn Porter appeared as Anna Broun and Elspeth March as the Dowager Empress. The part of Bounine was the one played by Yul Brynner in the film Anastasia (1956).

In the late 1970s, Wyngarde worked in the theatre in Austria and South Africa. In 1977, he played a summer season at Vienna's English Theatre, appearing as George Bernard Shaw in Dear Liar, then as Bosanquet in Big Toys and as Shylock in The Merchant of Venice. In 1978, he played an Arab oil sheikh in the film Himmel, Scheich und Wolkenbruch ("Sky, Sheikh and Cloudburst"), performing in German. Between the later months of 1978 and March 1979, he was on stage in Cape Town, Durban, and Salisbury, Rhodesia, appearing in Ira Levin's play Deathtrap.

Wyngarde took the role of the masked General Klytus in the film Flash Gordon (1980). This led on to an appearance later that year (in the persona of Klytus) in The Queen Special, a 50-minute film for television to promote the Flash Gordon soundtrack and Queen's album "The Game".

In 1983, at the Royal Alexandra Theatre, Toronto, and at the Prince of Wales Theatre in the West End, he appeared as Alexander Howard in the thriller Underground, with Raymond Burr and Marc Sinden.

In January 1984, Wyngarde appeared in three episodes of Crown Court as a leading criminal barrister defending a woman accused of blackmail. A month later, he guest-starred in the Doctor Who story Planet of Fire. Also in 1984, with Carol Royle and Gareth Hunt, Wyngarde had a leading role in the Hammer House of Mystery and Suspense story "And the Wall Came Tumbling Down", in which action switches between the 1980s and the 1640s, with Wyngarde playing a member of a coven of witches and a general commanding a NATO nuclear base. In December of the year, he was in The Two Ronnies Christmas Special, playing Sir Guy in a medieval story.

In 1985, Wyngarde appeared on television in the first series of Bulman, playing Gallio, a vice boss, in the episode "I Met a Man Who Wasn't There". The Liverpool Echo interviewed him about the part, noting that it was "the latest in a string of baddies he has played to get away from the hero image". It asked whether Jason King might yet return. Wyngarde said King had taken up four years of his life, and it was still possible the character could make a come-back.

In August 1986, Wyngarde was at the Hilton British Airways Playhouse, at the Hilton Hotel, Singapore, playing a murderer, Roat, in Wait Until Dark. A local review found that he "comes across well as the diabolical Mr Roat, but his comic abilities hamper his transition into a seasoned and sadistic murderer." In 1989, in the film Tank Malling, he played Sir Robert Knight, a seriously wicked business man.

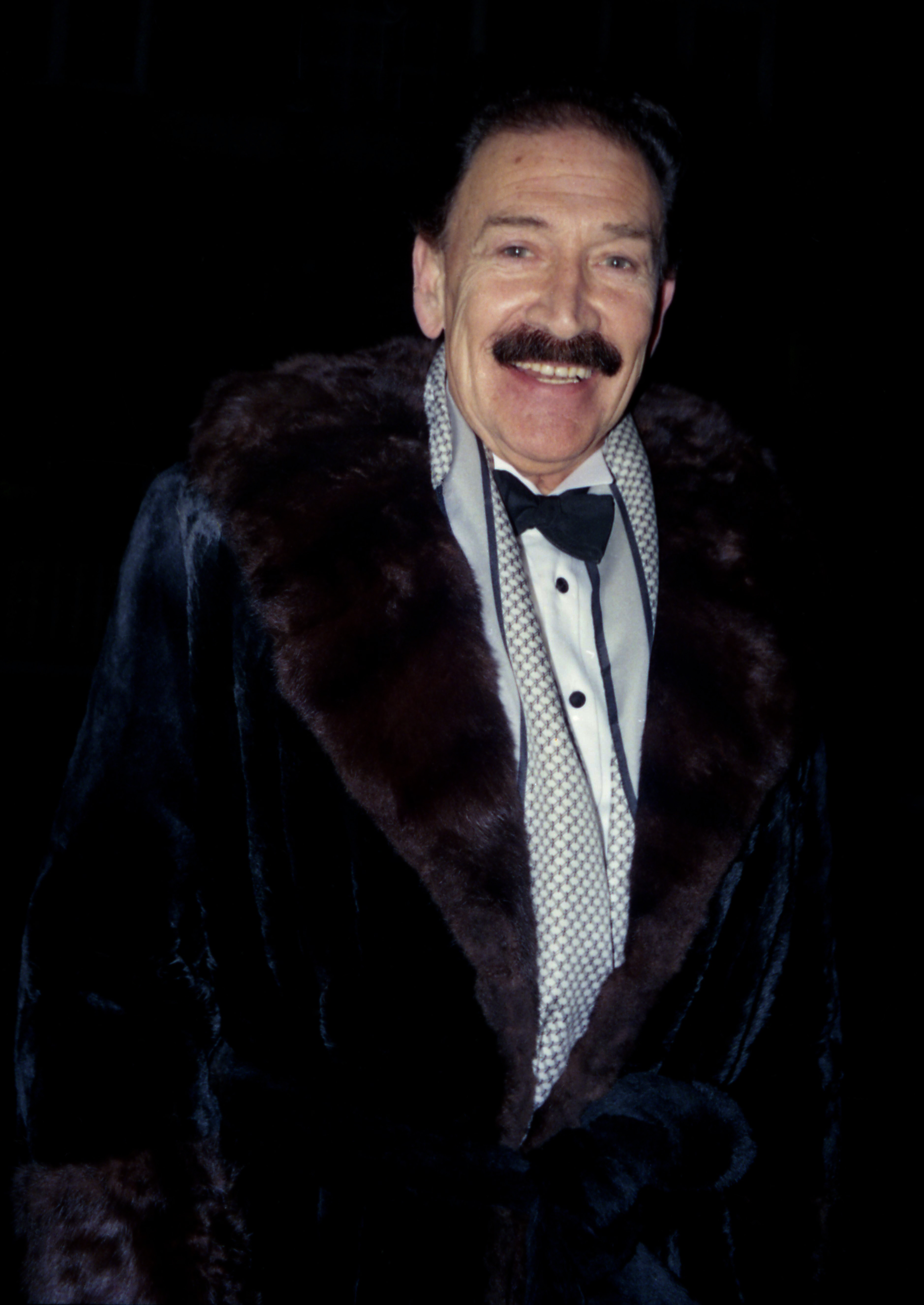
Wyngarde in 1992 by Allan Warren

In the 1990s, Wyngarde made appearances in The Lenny Henry Christmas Special (December 1994) and The Memoirs of Sherlock Holmes (1994), playing the part of Langdale Pike, king of gossip columnists, in "The Three Gables". One of his lines is "I withstand the blasts of time, can't you see?"

In 1995, Wyngarde was on the brink of playing the title role in The Cabinet of Dr. Caligari, at the Liverpool Playhouse, but left due to a throat infection while the show was still in previews. He was replaced by Peter Byrne, but only six days later he also left the show. After this, Wyngarde mostly stopped acting, apart from occasional voice work. He continued to appear in public at an event called "Memorabilia" and at others celebrating his past performances.

=== Advertising ===
For the Milk Tray Man campaign from 1970 to 1974, Wyngarde was the voice for the line 'And all because the lady loves Milk Tray'.

=== 21st century appearances ===
In November 2002, Wyngarde was one of the three subjects of an episode of the ITV programme After They Were Famous, together with Peter Sarstedt and Emlyn Hughes. The programme revealed that since his days of stardom Wyngarde had taken up the sport of clay pigeon shooting. In March 2004, he took part for the fourth time in a charity clay pigeon shoot at Vera Lynn’s country estate at Ditchling, together with Vinnie Jones, Richard Dunwoody, and Ross Burden.

Wyngarde and Cleo Rocos appeared on Channel 4 as guests of Simon Dee, in a one-episode revival of his chat show Dee Time, in January 2004.

Screenwriter Mark Millar has said that when he was casting his film Layer Cake (2004), the director Matthew Vaughn wanted Wyngarde for a part in it, but was told he had died. Seven years later, Vaughn again requested him, this time for a role in X-Men: First Class, but was again wrongly told that Wyngarde was dead.

In 2007, Wyngarde recorded extras for a DVD box-set of The Prisoner, including a mock interview segment called "The Pink Prisoner".

In December 2013, Wyngarde narrated an episode of the BBC Four Timeshift series, "How to Be Sherlock Holmes: The Many Faces of a Master Detective", when he talked about his appearances with two Holmes actors, Douglas Wilmer and Jeremy Brett.

Wyngarde appeared as himself in It was Alright in the... (2015), a documentary series for Channel 4. Asked about wearing blackface to play a Turk in The Saint, he said he had been uneasy about it and had done it only in the hope that a theatre director might pick him to play Othello.

=== Records ===
In 1970, Wyngarde recorded an album released by RCA Victor as an LP entitled Peter Wyngarde. This is a collection of spoken-word tracks to music by Vic Smith, with words by Wyngarde, produced and arranged by Hubert Thomas Valverde. Two seven-inch singles of tracks from the album were also issued in 1970, one of 'Peter Wyngarde "Commits" Rape' and the other of 'La Ronde de L'Amour', with 'The Way I Cry Over You' on the B-side. In the 'Rape' track, Wyngarde uses a range of foreign accents, including French, German, American, Chinese, Japanese, and Russian, to explain how perceptions of rape vary around the world. The fourth track consisted of Wyngarde reading the poem "The Unknown Citizen" by W. H. Auden. The LP was billed as addressing "the darker side of human behaviour".

The claim has been made that the album was withdrawn from sale after four days, but this is not reported elsewhere. Wyngarde commented "When RCA came up with an offer, they told me I could do whatever I liked – that's what really appealed to me. I saw the record as an entertainment in its own right; to be enjoyed tongue-in-cheek... we wanted to do something new." He also suggested that RCA was "mired in a scenario similar to The Producers", as it had wanted his album to be a tax loss and was shocked by its success.

In 1998, the album was reissued on CD by RPM Records, re-titled When Sex Leers Its Inquisitive Head. The album is now treated as a curiosity because of its unusual spoken-word style and the controversial subject matter.

== Personal life ==
In 1949, Wyngarde met the actress Dorinda Stevens. An obituary in The Times says they later went on holiday to Sicily and were married while there. In 1950, Wyngarde was living at 56, Strand-on-the-Green, Chiswick. In 1953, as Dorinda Wyngarde and Peter Wyngarde, both are recorded as living at 9, Holland Park, Kensington. It lasted for three years, and by November 1955 Stevens was described in a TV Times profile as "a bachelor girl, sharing a mews flat near Portland Place, London, with Cassio, her wire-haired terrier". (Wyngarde had been playing Cassio in the summer of 1949.) In 1957, while filming in Karen, Kenya, she married the Canadian cinematographer William Michael Boultbee.

Interviewed for The Sydney Morning Herald in 1972, Wyngarde said his biggest regret was that he "married far too young", adding: "It lasted three years and the last year was pretty hell. However, one just goes on learning from one's mistakes doesn't one?"

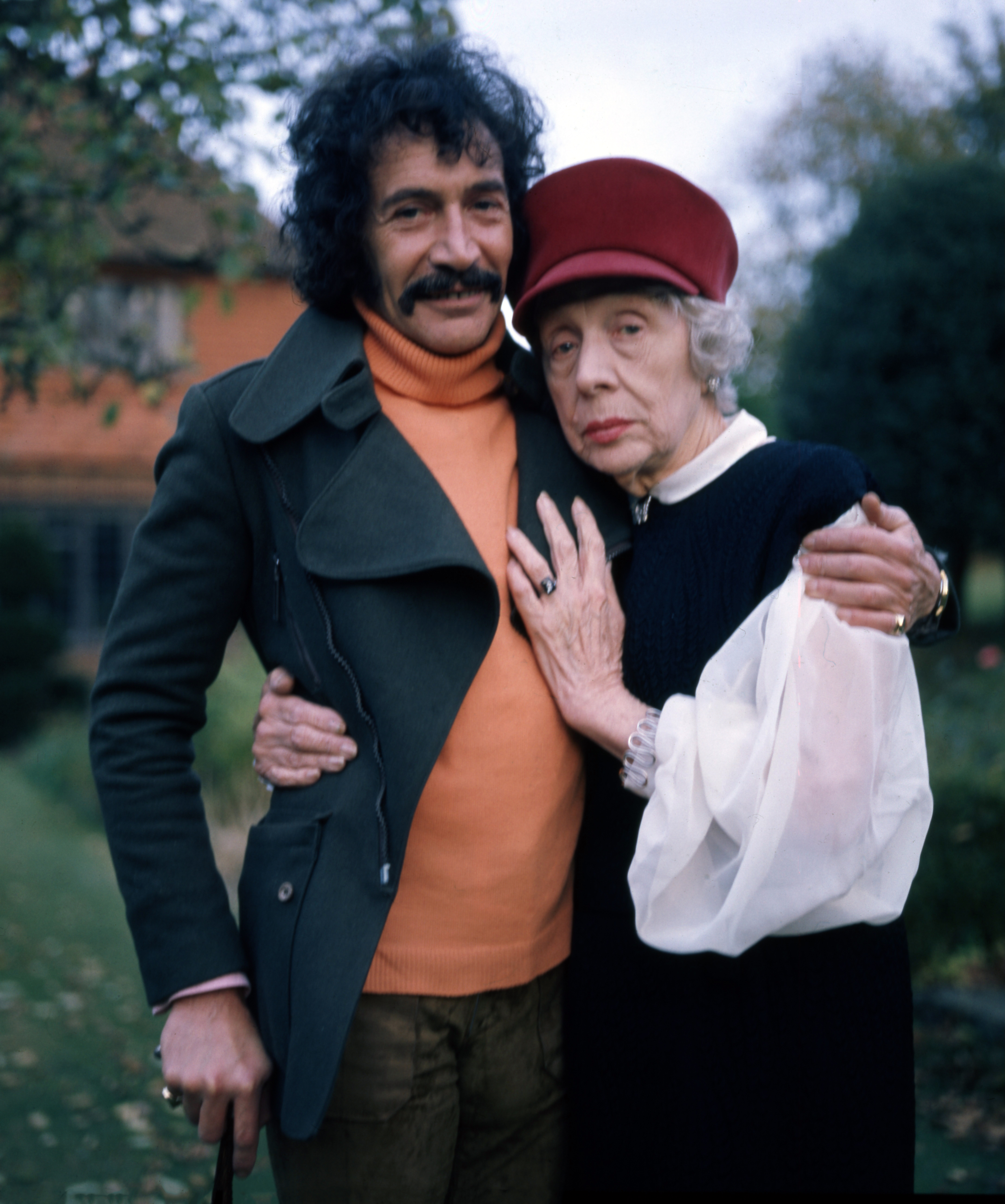
Wyngarde and Edith Evans, his neighbour at Cranbrook, Kent

In August 1956, using his earnings from Alexander the Great, Wyngarde bought a cottage at Kilndown in Kent, next door to the actress Edith Evans, and for some years spent much of his time there when not working.

From 1956 to 1958, Wyngarde appears to have shared a flat in London with Ruby Talbot. At 11, Oxford Mews, Paddington, the names on the 1956, 1957, and 1958 lists of electors are "Ruby J. Talbot" and "Peter P. Wyngarde". At no. 4 were Lawrence Dundas, Earl of Ronaldshay, and his wife Katherine. In July 1957, Talbot married Reginald Stenning at Chanctonbury.

In 1958, Wyngarde rented a flat at number 1, Earls Terrace, off Kensington High Street, London, and would keep it for the rest of his life. He shared that flat for some years with fellow actor Alan Bates; according to some sources, this was a romantic relationship, and it was sometimes assumed within the acting community that Wyngarde was gay. It has been claimed that he was the target of the nickname "Petunia Winegum", but this may have originated in a comedy sketch, rather than being a name used in real life.

In 1958, Wyngarde appeared with Vivien Leigh in a stage production of Duel of Angels at the Apollo Theatre, and in 1960 they both went to New York to take the same parts in the play when it was presented there. He became her lover after she ended her affair with Peter Finch. On 20 June 1960 the Singapore Free Press carried a story saying Leigh was on a visit to England and wanted to discuss a divorce with Laurence Olivier. It printed a photo with the caption "Vivien with Peter Wyngard [sic], her frequent companion these days". Wyngarde later called Leigh "the love of my life".

On 25 October 1960, travelling first class on the Cunard liner RMS Queen Elizabeth, Wyngarde arrived at Southampton from New York City, giving his marital status as single, his date of birth as 27 July 1929, his occupation as "Actor", and his address as "Conifer Tree, Kilndown, Cranbrook".

In 1971, Felicity Kendal appeared in Jason King, and some years later Wyngarde said "I fell in love with her". Kendal commented that he was "great fun".

In July 1974, at a trial at the Old Bailey, Jeremy Dallas-Cope, described as Wyngarde's "£20-a-week male secretary", was found guilty of forging nearly £3,000-worth of cheques from his employer's bank account (equivalent to £27,968 in 2025) "to pay for his good life among the Chelsea elite", and was sent to prison for two years. On being found out, Dallas-Cope had talked his flat-mate into attempting suicide and into taking the blame for the fraud. He too was convicted and given a prison sentence.

Wyngarde's personal life came under scrutiny in October 1975 when he was prosecuted under his real name, Cyril Goldbert, for gross indecency with a crane driver in public toilets in Gloucester bus station. The allegation related to the evening of 8 September of that year, and Wyngarde pleaded guilty. His solicitor said in his defence that he was not a homosexual and "did not go in there for this purpose", but he admitted to masturbation and sought to mitigate this as an "aberration" brought on by excessive drinking. Wyngarde was convicted and fined £75. In April 2023, the Peter Wyngarde website published an email from the Home Office saying "Further to your application on behalf of the deceased, since the conduct constituting the offence was perceived sexual activity between persons of the same sex (unproven), and the conviction met the conditions for a disregard, then he is posthumously pardoned. This is retrospective."

In July 1977, the Inland Revenue lodged a petition in the High Court of Justice for the winding-up of the company Wyngarde Productions, and a winding-up order was made in October. The liquidator took until May 1980 to finish his work, and the company was dissolved in February 1984.

Late in 1977, Wyngarde represented himself successfully at the hearing of a paternity action in a court in Vienna, with a 23-year-old woman claiming to have given birth to his child. He later commented:

The girl maintained that I'd f****d her and left her pregnant. To be honest, I can't really remember whether I did or not, as I was drinking quite a lot at the time.

Wyngarde told an interviewer some years later that at the height of his fame "I drank myself to a standstill ... I am amazed I am still here". But he added that he had stopped drinking in the early 1980s.

On 22 November 1982, Wyngarde was declared bankrupt. At the time, the newspapers reported that his financial downfall had been caused by buying a farm in Gloucestershire for £53,000; that within four years, his income had plummeted, and that at the time of the hearing he was unemployed and living on social security. He was discharged from bankruptcy on 14 June 1988.

In May 1996, under the headline "Good buy for Jason: how are the mighty fallen", the Daily Mirror printed a reader's photo of Wyngarde looking at men's overcoats in an Oxfam charity shop. Revisiting 1975, the story mocked "the discovery in court that the real name of this debonair heart-throb was Cyril Louis Goldbert".

In December 1996, Wyngarde told the Scotland on Sunday newspaper that his reputation as a lady-killer was "not completely undeserved", and added "There's no such thing as being gay or bisexual or heterosexual. It's just how you feel at the time. It's about relationships." After his death, Bob Stanley posted on Twitter: "My favourite Peter Wyngarde line, to a friend of mine over dinner, "I'm 50% vegetarian, 100% bisexual"", but the source of this is unclear. In May 2025, Simon Heffer repeated it, without attribution.

In old age, Wyngarde answered questions about what he liked best. He said his favourite book was Brideshead Revisited, his favourite film The Thief of Baghdad (the Alexander Korda one) his favourite poet W. H. Auden, his favourite television shows Inspector Montalbano, Seinfeld, and True Crime, his favourite colour azure blue, his favourite drink paw paw juice, and his favourite animal the panther. The person he most admired was Luchino Visconti. The sports he most enjoyed were fencing, tennis, pistol target shooting, and clay pigeon shooting. When asked what had been the best moment in his acting career, he replied "When the director of the famous Old Vic asked me to do a season there."

In 2012, Wyngarde was found to be suffering from emphysema and coronary artery disease. As a result, he had a triple coronary artery bypass at the Chelsea and Westminster Hospital.

Wyngarde was a friend of the singer Morrissey. When asked in 2021 "What deceased personal friend do you miss the most?", Morrissey's answer was "Victoria Wood or Peter Wyngarde." In his Autobiography (2013), Morrissey wrote about visiting Wyngarde's flat in Earls Terrace:

It's an Edwardian warren of clerical ferocity – a tornado of books and papers and swelling pyramids of typescripts, half-finished, half-begun. His voice is still of great clarity and sound, his eyes unchanged since that period known as his prime. But he is no longer on stage or television. Film generally tells us that people of Peter's age don’t actually exist, or, if they do, they are hopelessly infirm and in the way of the main storyline. He sits before me as one who knew his duty and did it, beyond all praise, alive in the cinema of the mind.

== Death and legacy ==
Wyngarde died on 15 January 2018. His agent and manager, Thomas Bowington, said on Good Morning Scotland that he had been admitted to the Chelsea and Westminster Hospital in October 2017 and had had a long illness. He told Associated Press that "His mind was razor sharp until the end. He entertained that whole hospital."

The funeral took place on 25 January at the Golders Green Crematorium, which has no limits on the form and content of the service. Two recordings of Wyngarde's voice were played, "Once Again (Flight Number 10)" from his album, and part of his solo performance of Samuel Beckett's A Piece of Monologue. The music included Annie Lennox's Love Song for a Vampire.

Administration of Wyngarde's estate was granted in the Brighton probate registry on 23 April 2019, with two members of the Goldbert family appointed as administrators, seemingly against Wyngarde's wishes. Tina Wyngarde-Hopkins's biography of Wyngarde and the Hellfire Club web site detail some disputes between the author and Wyngarde's administrators over his estate.

An auction of 250 items from the actor's estate took place on 26 March 2020 and included books, pictures, props used on stage, a snakeskin jacket and other clothes, photographs, jewellery, and Wyngarde's childhood teddy-bear. All items were sold, and the auction fetched over £35,000. The trophy for Best Dressed Personality of 1970, a hallmarked silver figure of Beau Brummell, with a plaque reading "John Stephen Fashion Award – Peter Wyngarde – Best Dressed Personality – 1970", reached the highest sale price, with a winning bid of £2,200.

In National Review, under the heading "An International Man of Mystery", Andrew Stuttaford wrote

Peter Wyngarde’s death was accompanied by wryly affectionate obituaries and, among Brits of a certain age, a certain sadness: For a brief iridescent moment, one of the zanier icons of their youth had shone. Now he was gone.

== In popular culture ==
A comic-book character called "Mastermind" was created by Stan Lee and Jack Kirby for The X-Men in 1964. Inspired by the Avengers episode "A Touch of Brimstone", Chris Claremont and John Byrne later renamed Mastermind as "Jason Wyngarde", redesigning the character to resemble Wyngarde.

Mike Myers credited Wyngarde with inspiring the character of Austin Powers.

In 1992, an episode of Harry Enfield's Television Programme featured a parody of ITC aventure series titled The Playboys, with Enfield as Jason Queen, based on Wyngarde as Jason King. Similarly, a 1993 episode of The Comic Strip Presents..., "Detectives on the Edge of a Nervous Breakdown" included Peter Richardson as Jason Bentley, also parodying Wyngarde's character.

== Biographies and appreciation societies ==
In 2012, a career biography of Wyngarde by Roger Langley, the organiser of Six of One, the appreciation society of The Prisoner television series, was published by Escape Books. A second edition of the book appeared in 2019.

Peter Wyngarde had an active fan club from the mid-1950s to 1985. An appreciation society called the Hellfire Club was founded in 1992, with the actor's support, with Diana Rigg and Joel Fabiani among the members. At first, the members received a quarterly magazine by post, with Issue Number 1 dated January 1993, and Issue Number 28 dated Autumn 1999. This went online in October 1999 and as of 2025 the web site is still regularly updated.

In 2020, the organiser of the Hellfire Club published a biography of Wyngarde, drawing on personal knowledge of him and on hundreds of documents from an archive she had built up over some thirty years. In 2018, three weeks after his death, she had changed her surname from Bate to Wyngarde-Hopkins. Steven Berkoff wrote "This is an intimate biography that is elegantly crafted, intensively researched, and presented with the utmost honour."

== Films ==
- Dick Barton Strikes Back (1949) – soldier (uncredited)
- The Dybbuk, BBC movie based on the play by Shloyme Rappoport (October 1952) – Channon
- Alexander the Great (1956) – Pausanias
- The Gambler, based on Dostoevsky's novel (BBC, August 1956) –Marquis des Grieux
- The Widows of Jaffa (BBC, June 1957) – Mustafa, an Arab interpreter
- Ordeal by Fire (BBC, October 1957) – Jerome Taillard
- The Siege of Sidney Street (1960) – Peter
- The Innocents (1961) – Peter Quint
- Night of the Eagle (1962) – Norman Taylor
- Lucy in London, a television movie starring Lucille Ball (1966) – himself and Petruchio
- Himmel, Scheich und Wolkenbruch (1979) – Scheich Al-Abdullah
- Flash Gordon (1980) – Klytus
- Tank Malling (1989, also released as Beyond Soho) – Sir Robert Knight

== Television ==
1950s

- Sunday Night Theatre: "The Rope" (8 January 1950), as Charles Granillo
- Sunday Night Theatre: "As You Like It", in two parts (15 and 19 March 1953), as Silvius
- Sunday Night Theatre: "L'Aiglon" by Edmond Rostand (12 April 1953), as Prokesch
- Sunday Night Theatre: "Will Shakespeare" by Clemence Dane (24 and 28 May 1953), as Will Shakespeare
- The Honourable History of Friar Bacon and Friar Bungay by Robert Greene, BBC Television (17 November 1953), as Earl of Lincoln
- Sunday Night Theatre: "The Rose Without a Thorn" by Clifford Bax (27 and 31 December 1953), as Francis Derham
- Liebelei, a full-length BBC Television play by Arthur Schnitzler (15 June 1954), as Fritz
- Stage by Stage: "The Relapse, or, Virtue in Danger" by John Vanbrugh (7 December 1954), as Worthy
- Terminus: "Hour of Decision" (4 June 1955), as Tommy Glen
- Play of the Week: "The Salt Land" by Peter Shaffer (8 November 1955), as Arich
- Jesus of Nazareth: "Preparing the Way" (12 February 1956), as John the Baptist
- Nom-de-Plume: "The Man from the Sea" (18 May 1956), as Blunt
- Nom-de-Plume: "Child of Her Time" by Ian Dallas (8 June 1956), as Monsieur Latouche
- Nom-de-Plume: "Elephants Don't Disappear" (31 August 1956), as Erich Weiss
- ITV Television Playhouse: "The Bridge" (20 December 1956), as Major Marshall
- Assignment Foreign Legion: "The Debt" by Max Ehrlich and A. R. Rawlinson (28 December 1956) as Lt. Charles Designe
- Play of the Week: "An Enemy of the People" (20 March 1957), as Hovstad
- ITV Television Playhouse: "Evening in Hochsberg" (4 April 1957), as Nicholas Florian
- A Tale of Two Cities, BBC television series adapted from Dickens by John Keir Cross, seven episodes (4 August to 15 September 1957), as Sydney Carton
- Overseas Press Club - Exclusive!: "The George Polk Story" (3 August 1957), as Andrea Bakolas
- Jack Hylton's Monday Show: "Hotel Riviera" (1957), as Young Maharajah
- Sunday Night Theatre: "The English Family Robinson 4: Free Passage Home" by Iain MacCormick (17 November 1957), as Dr Bannerji
- ITV Television Playhouse: "Love Her to Death" (6 December 1957), as Lionel Collins
- Armchair Theatre: "The Shining Hour" by Keith Winter (5 January 1958), as David Linden
- General Electric Theater: "Time to Go Now" (19 January 1958), as Raymond De Tresk
- Television World Theatre: "The Dark is Light Enough" by Christopher Fry (26 January 1958), as Richard Gettner
- Sword of Freedom: "The Sicilian" by Ian McLellan Hunter (7 March 1958), as Colonna
- The Adventures of Ben Gunn, from a novel by R. F. Delderfield, all six episodes (1 June to 6 July 1958), as Long John Silver
- Sunday Night Theatre: "The Royal Family of Broadway" (3 August 1958), as Anthony Cavendish
- Play of the Week: "The Education of Mr. Surrage" (20 January 1959), as Geoffrey Valance
- Epilogue to Capricorn: three episodes (October to December 1959), as Peter Vauxhall
- Play of the Week: Engineer Extraordinary, Television Wales and the West (18 November 1959), as Isambard Kingdom Brunel
- Play of the Week: "South", based on a play by Julien Green (24 November 1959), as Lieutenant Jan Wicziewsky

1960s

- Granada Television's On Trial: "Sir Roger Casement" (8 July 1960), as Sir Roger Casement
- Play of the Week: "Negative Evidence" (7 February 1961), as Major Peter Brayling
- One Step Beyond: "Nightmare" (1961), as Paul Roland
- BBC Sunday-Night Play: "Loyalties" by John Galsworthy (29 April 1962), as Ferdinand de Levis
- Armchair Theatre: "Night Conspirators", by Robert Muller (6 May 1962), as Werner Loder
- Out of This World: "Cold Equations" (14 July 1962), as Captain Martin Barton
- About Religion: "Dinner with the Devil" by Christopher Hollis (23 December 1962)
- Play of the Week: "Darkness at Noon" by Arthur Koestler and Sidney Kingsley (15 January 1963), as Gletkin
- Play of the Week: "Camino Real" by Tennessee Williams and Hugh Leonard (27 January 1964), as Casanova
- Play of the Week – A Midsummer Night's Dream (24 June 1964), as Oberon
- Play of the Week: "A Choice of Coward, 1 – Present Laughter" (10 August 1964), as Garry Essendine
- Rupert of Hentzau: six episodes (19 April to 24 May 1964) as Rupert of Hentzau
- R3: "The Forum" (2 January 1965), as Dr Henri Lefevbre
- Play of the Week: "The Rules of the Game" by Luigi Pirandello (15 February 1965), as Guido
- Sherlock Holmes in "The Illustrious Client" (20 February 1965) as Baron Grüner
- Walt Disney's Wonderful World of Color: "The Further Adventures of Gallegher: A Case of Murder" (26 September 1965), as Sir Richard Westerby
- Festival: "Ashes to Ashes" by Marc Brandel (2 February 1966)
- The Avengers: "A Touch of Brimstone" (19 February 1966) as Cartney
- The Man in Room 17: "First Steal Six Eggs" (29 April 1966), as Paul Panacek
- The Saint: "The Man Who Liked Lions" (18 November 1966), as Tiberio Magadino
- The Baron: "The Legions of Ammak" (30 November 1966), as King Ibrahim and Ronald Noyes
- Turn Out the Lights: "The Boyhood Haunt" (January 1967), as Richard Merlin
- ITV Play of the Week: "The Crossfire" (7 February 1967), as Hugo de Croissillon
- The Avengers: "Epic" (1967), as Stewart Kirby
- The Saint: "The Gadic Collection" (24 June 1967), as Turen
- Love Story: "It's a long way to Transylvania" (7 September 1967), as Konrad von Kroll
- I Spy: "Let's Kill Karlovassi" (11 September 1967), as George
- The Revenue Men: "The Exile" by N. J. Crisp (3 November 1967), as General Daniel
- The Troubleshooters: "A Nice White Girl – Is She For Sale?" (17 November 1967) as Sheik Mohammed bin Falik
- Scottish Television's Scottish Playbill : "The Queen of Scots" (29 November 1967), as William Maitland of Lethington
- The Prisoner: "Checkmate" (December 1967) as Number Two
- The Champions: "The Invisible Man" (1968), as Dr John Hallam
- Department S (28 episodes, 1969–1970), as Jason King

1970s

- Jason King (26 episodes, 1971–1972), as Jason King

1980s

- The Queen Special, a film for television to promote Queen's albums "The Game" and "Flash Gordon" (8 November 1980), as Klytus / Narrator
- Crown Court: "The Son of His Father", Parts 1, 2, and 3 (17, 18, and 19 January 1984), as Charles Marchington QC
- Doctor Who: Planet of Fire, Parts 1, 2, 3, and 4 (23 February to 2 March 1984), as Timanov
- Hammer House of Mystery and Suspense: "And the Wall Came Tumbling Down" (19 November 1984), as Daniel Haswill and General Haswill
- The Two Ronnies: "1984 Christmas Special" (25 December 1984), as Sir Guy
- Bulman: "I Met a Man Who Wasn't There" (1985), as Gallio
- The Comic Strip Presents...: "The Yob" (12 March 1988), as Mr Kendal

1990s

- Memoirs of Sherlock Holmes in "The Three Gables" (1994), as Langdale Pike
- The Lenny Henry Show: "The Lenny Henry Christmas Special" (December 1994), as Mr Bad

2000s

- After They Were Famous, with Emlyn Hughes (2 November 2002) as himself
- Dee Time on Channel 4, with Simon Dee (January 2004), as himself

2010s

- Timeshift: "How to Be Sherlock Holmes: The Many Faces of a Master Detective" (December 2013), as himself
- It was Alright in the... for Channel 4 (2015), as himself
