= South (Play of the Week) =

- Play of the Week episode
- Directed by: Mario Prizek
- Written by: Gerald Savory
- Based on: Sud by Julien Green
- Original air date: 24 November 1959
- Running time: 80 minutes

"South" is a 1959 British made-for-television play written by Gerald Savory, directed by Mario Prizek, and starring Peter Wyngarde, Graydon Gould, and Helena Hughes. First aired on Play of the Week on 24 November 1959, the production was adapted from Sud, a 1953 play by Julien Green. The British Film Institute has described "South" as the "earliest known gay TV drama" in the United Kingdom.

== Premise ==
A dashing Polish Army lieutenant named Jan Wicziewsky is in exile in the United States deep South as civil war approaches. He is faced with the question of who he really loves: the plantation owner's angry niece, Miss Regina, or the tall, blond, rugged officer who suddenly arrives at the plantation, a handsome man called Eric MacClure.

== Cast ==
- Peter Wyngarde as Lieutenant Jan Wicziewsky
- Bessie Love as Mrs. Strong
- Graydon Gould as Eric MacClure
- Helena Hughes as Regina
- Barbara Assoon as Eliza
- Juliet Cooke as Miss Priolleau
- Noel Dyson as Laura Priolleau
- Karal Gardner as Angelina Broderick
- Alan Gifford as Edward Broderick
- Karl Lanchbury as Jimmy Broderick
- Johnny Sekka as Jeremy

== Production history ==
A television play is a live drama performance broadcast from the television studio, and they often were not recorded or if they were, they were later wiped. This production was thought to be a lost film, until it was re-discovered in 2013 by curators at the British Film Institute. Simon McCallum of the BFI said "it just wasn't known that this film existed other than to a few specialist researchers", and the production "is a milestone" in gay cultural history. The 1961 film Victim, with Dirk Bogarde was generally considered the milestone for gay representation on film and TV, but with this discovery, South becomes the earliest known British gay TV drama. Peter Wyngarde who played the lead character was a closeted gay man at the time, but it was known in the acting world that he was gay. McCallum said "you have to give Wyngarde a massive pat on the back in terms of the bravery in taking this role. There were quite bad reactions from some of the press." Julien Green who wrote the original play the film is based on, was also gay. The play was set to be performed in London in 1955, but was banned by the Lord Chamberlain, because of the homosexual themes. By 1959, the Lord Chamberlain had eased his hard-line stance on homosexual themes, and Gerald Savory adapted the play for television.

== Contemporary reviews ==
In 1959 a reporter for the Daily Sketch wrote: "I do NOT see anything attractive in the agonies and ecstasies of a pervert, especially in close-up in my sitting room. This is not prudishness. There are some indecencies in life that are best left covered up." A November 1959 review in The Stage, said "Green's dialogue was so full of compassion, understanding and tenderness that his subject didn't seem distasteful, and Mario Prizek, a new Canadian director, toned down his production so much that it kept perfect pace with the script...Peter Wyngarde as Jan, the man who couldn’t talk of his life like other men, gave a stunningly brilliant performance, controlled and delicately pitched". And in describing the plot of the film, they said "So moved, so profound is (Wicziewsky's) love for Eric MacClure that he forces a duel on him and allows himself to be killed rather than live without him."

== See also ==
- List of rediscovered films
- Victim
