= The Adventures of Ben Gunn (TV series) =

British television series

- Genre: Adventure
- Based on: The Adventures of Ben Gunn by R.F. Delderfield
- Written by: R.F. Delderfield
- Starring: John Moffatt; Peter Wyngarde; Rupert Davies
- Country of origin: United Kingdom
- Original language: English
- No. of series: 1
- No. of episodes: 6

Production
- Producer: Desmond O'Donovan
- Running time: 30 minutes
- Production company: BBC

Original release
- Network: BBC 1
- Release: 1 June – 6 July 1958

The Adventures of Ben Gunn is a British television series which originally aired on the BBC in 1958. It was based on R.F. Delderfield's 1956 novel The Adventures of Ben Gunn, written as a prequel to Robert Louis Stevenson's Treasure Island.

== Main cast ==
- John Moffatt as Ben Gunn
- Peter Wyngarde as John Silver
- Rupert Davies as Captain Flint
- Meadows White as Ben Gunn - as an Old Man
- John H. Watson as Jim Hawkins
- Richard Coleman as Nick Allardyce
- Nigel Arkwright as Gabriel Pew
- Sean Lynch as Israel Hands
- Gertan Klauber as Black Dog
- Rodney Burke as Anderson
- Neil Hallett as Tom Morgan
- Terry Baker as Davis
- Olaf Pooley as Billy Bones
- Michael Corcoran as Darby Magraw
- Ayton Medas as Big Prosper
- Basil Hoskins as Gaston
- Peter Vaughan as Sergeant Hoxton
- John Barrett as Private Barnes
- Anthony Harrison as Captain Ayrton

== Bibliography ==
- Baskin, Ellen . Serials on British Television, 1950-1994. Scolar Press, 1996.
