= The Rules of the Game (play) =

Play by Luigi Pirandello

The Rules of the Game (Italian: Il gi(u)oco delle parti [il ˈdʒ(w)ɔːko ˈdelle ˈparti]) is a play by Luigi Pirandello. It was written and first performed during 1918 (and first published in 1919) at the time when his wife was suffering from mental illness, but before she was committed to a mental hospital. It was first performed at the Teatro Quirino in Rome, with Ruggero Ruggeri as Leone. The Italian title means The Game of Roles, but the play is not usually published with that title in English.

The characters in Pirandello's better-known work Six Characters in Search of an Author (1921) are rehearsing this play.

== Plot summary ==
Leone is estranged from his wife Silia who is having an affair with a man called Guido. Rather than allow himself to feel betrayed and angry, Leone chooses to empty himself of all emotion, becoming — in his own words — like an empty eggshell. He manipulates Guido into taking his place in a duel, in which Guido dies. Other characters include a group of drunken young men, who give Silia the opportunity for her scheming, and one of whom becomes the duellist; two friends of Leone, Barelli and Dr Spiga; and Leone's servant, Philip.

== Performances ==
The play has been translated into English by Robert Rietty. Performances in England include:

- 1953: BBC Third Programme, radio.
- 1955: Arts Theatre, London: with Donald Pleasence as Leone, Melissa Stribling as Silia, Robert Cartland as Guido. Directed by John Fernald.
- Play of the Week (ITV Granada, 15 February 1965), with Anthony Quayle, Peter Wyngarde and Gwen Watford
- 1966: The Oxford Playhouse: with Leonard Rossiter as Leone, Judi Dench as Silia. Directed by James Grout.
- 1971: The Royal National Theatre, London: with Paul Scofield, Joan Plowright, Tom Baker. Directed by Anthony Page. Translation by Robert Rietty and David Hare.
- 1982: Yvonne Arnaud Theatre, Guildford with tour and Haymarket Theatre, London: with Leonard Rossiter, Mel Martin, Stephan Chase. Directed by Anthony Quayle.
