= The Adventures of Ben Gunn =

1956 novel

- First US edition
- Author: R.F. Delderfield
- Language: English
- Genre: Adventure
- Publisher: Hodder & Stoughton (UK); Bobbs-Merrill (US)
- Publication date: 1956
- Publication place: United Kingdom
- Media type: Print

The Adventures of Ben Gunn is a 1956 adventure novel by the British writer R.F. Delderfield. It is a prequel to Robert Louis Stevenson's Treasure Island.

In 1958 it was adapted into a BBC television series of the same title starring Peter Wyngarde and Rupert Davies.

== Bibliography ==
- Baskin, Ellen . Serials on British Television, 1950-1994. Scolar Press, 1996.
- Drew, Bernard A. Literary Afterlife: The Posthumous Continuations of 325 Authors' Fictional Characters. McFarland, 2010.
