= What the Butler Saw (The Avengers) =

- The Avengers episode
- Screen title
- Episode no.: Season 4 Episode 22
- Directed by: Bill Bain
- Written by: Brian Clemens
- Original air dates: 22 February 1966 (Scottish Television); 26 February 1966 (ABC Weekend TV)

Episode chronology
← Previous "A Touch of Brimstone"	Next → "The House That Jack Built"

"What the Butler Saw" is the twenty-second episode of the fourth series of the 1960s British spy-fi television series The Avengers, starring Patrick Macnee and Diana Rigg. It was first broadcast by Scottish Television on Tuesday 22 February 1966. ABC Weekend Television, who commissioned the show, broadcast it in its own regions four days later on Saturday 26 February. The episode was directed by Bill Bain and teleplayed by Brian Clemens.

== Plot ==
A butler asks for a pay rise to a hidden man in a chair. Another butler, Benson, is called in and brings in a gun on a plate. The first butler is shot dead by the hidden man.

Steed visits a barber for a shave. His barber reports that one of three high officers is a spy, but is stabbed dead before he can say more. Steed, in disguises that spoof the styles of the various services, investigates the three officers - Vice Admiral Willows, Brigadier Ponsonby-Goddard and Group Capt. "Georgie" Miles - and learns about their respective vices: Willows is a gambler, the Brigadier a drunkard and Miles notorious as a womanizer. Steed also meets the Brigadier's octogenarian father, Major General Ponsonby-Goddard, who reenacts cavalry battles in the garden, and Sergeant Moran, who delivers supplies to Group Capt. Miles's residence.

Mrs Peel seduces Miles with photographs of herself, is invited to dinner and finds out that he is neither a spy nor a womanizer. Steed enrolls at the training academy which the murdered butlers attended and discovers that Miles's butler, Hubert Hemming, is also the head of the academy. Steed learns to polish shoes, press trousers, and adhere to the motto, "Brighter, Better, More Beautiful Butling". He impresses Hemming, but Hemming's second, Benson, suspects Steed to be an imposter.

Hemming is lured away from his work and, apparently unwilling to go along with a plan, killed by Benson. Steed discovers Hemming's body and is held by Benson at gunpoint. Benson informs him that his false references make him trustworthy. Benson sends Steed to butler for Miles, whilst Miles is romancing Mrs Peel. As the three officers attend a private conference, Steed and their other butlers get instructions to pour wine over their masters. Benson then fetches their stained uniform jackets. Steed and Mrs Peel discover that Benson has hidden recorders in the jackets for his real boss, the hidden man in the chair, now revealed as Sergeant Moran, resentful of being reduced to a delivery boy. With the help of the Major General, Steed and Mrs Peel defeat Moran and Benson, before flying off in a helicopter.

== Cast ==
- Patrick Macnee as John Steed
- Diana Rigg as Emma Peel
- Thorley Walters as Hubert Hemming
- John Le Mesurier as Benson
- Denis Quilley as Group Capt. "Georgie" Miles
- Humphrey Lestocq as Vice Admiral Willows
- Howard Marion-Crawford as Brigadier "Percy" Ponsonby-Goddard
- Kynaston Reeves as Major General Ponsonby-Goddard
- Ewan Hooper as Sergeant Moran
- Leon Sinden as Squadron Leader Hogg
- David Swift as Barber
- Norman Scace as Reeves
- Peter Hughes as Walters
- Pamela Davies as the WREN

== Production ==
Production for the episode was completed from mid-late December 1965 to early January 1966.

== Reception ==
Lamp stands shaped Minoan bulls used to decorate Miles's bachelor pad, designed by Harry Pottle, started retailing in a department in London six months after the episode was aired and have been cited as having "overtones of virility and eroticism and evidently considered highly saleable".
