= Commonwealth Line =

Australian shipping company

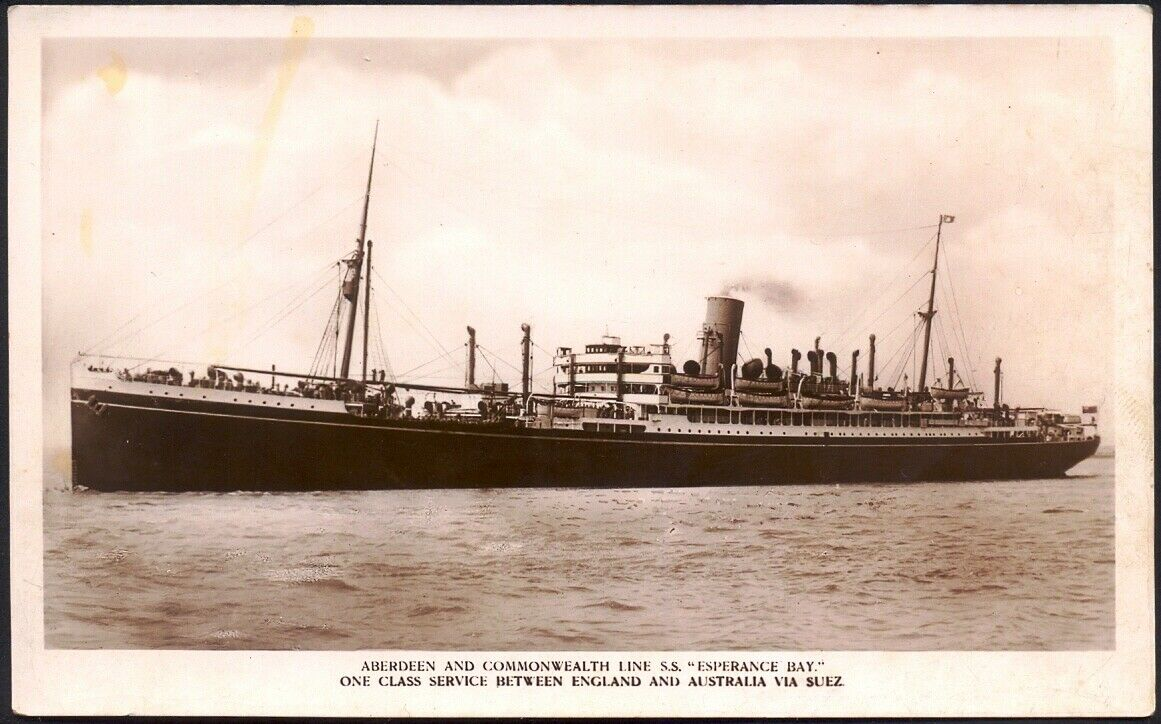
- The Bay-class Esperance Bay (launched 1921, later renamed Arawa)
- Company type: Government-owned
- Owner: Australian Federal Government

The Commonwealth Line was a shipping company owned and operated by the Australian federal government between 1916 and 1928. It was officially known as the Commonwealth Government Line of Steamers until 1923, and thereafter as the Australian Commonwealth Line of Steamers.

== History ==
The Commonwealth Line began as a pet project of Prime Minister Billy Hughes. While visiting England in mid-1916, Hughes purchased 15 tramp steamers to transport Australian commodities (particular wool and wheat) to export markets. This was a risky venture, as the British government had the right to requisition some or all of the fleet for the war effort. However, Hughes managed to convince H. H. Asquith not to take any of the vessels, so long as no more were purchased before the end of the war. Back in Australia, another 23 ships came under the new company's control, which had been seized by the government from German and Austrian owners.

After the war's end, the Commonwealth Line built five large ocean liners to carry immigrants from England. By 1921, the company was making only a small profit each year and was often a target for industrial (labour) action. In 1923, Hughes was replaced as prime minister by Stanley Bruce, who opposed the government's ownership of the line as a financial burden and an unfair competitor against private operators. The Bruce Government sold off the fleet over the next few years, culminating in a final sale to the White Star Line in 1928. They were later on sold to the Aberdeen Line, which renamed itself the Aberdeen & Commonwealth Line. On paper the fleet was valued at around £8 million, but the government received only £500,000 due to the buyer defaulting.

In the final parliamentary vote to approve the sale, the entire Labor Party voted against and were joined by only non-Labor members, Percy Stewart and William Watson. Billy Hughes absented himself from the vote. In the prior debate, he described the line as "my progeny, and whether it be unique or a monstrosity, I, like most parents, am still attached to the poor thing ... I am present at the obsequies of the Line, as I was at its birth".

== Ships ==
The fleet of ships that were operated included requisitioned sailing ships.

In 1921–1922, the company built a fleet of five Bay-class ocean liners, principally for the emigrant trade from the British Isles to Australia.

- Moreton Bay
- Esperance Bay
- Hobsons Bay
- Jervis Bay
- Largs Bay

Moreton Bay was the first to be launched, at the Barrow Shipyard on 21 April 1921.

== See also ==
- Australian National Line, a similar government-owned corporation formed in 1956
