= SS Esperance Bay =

British ocean liner

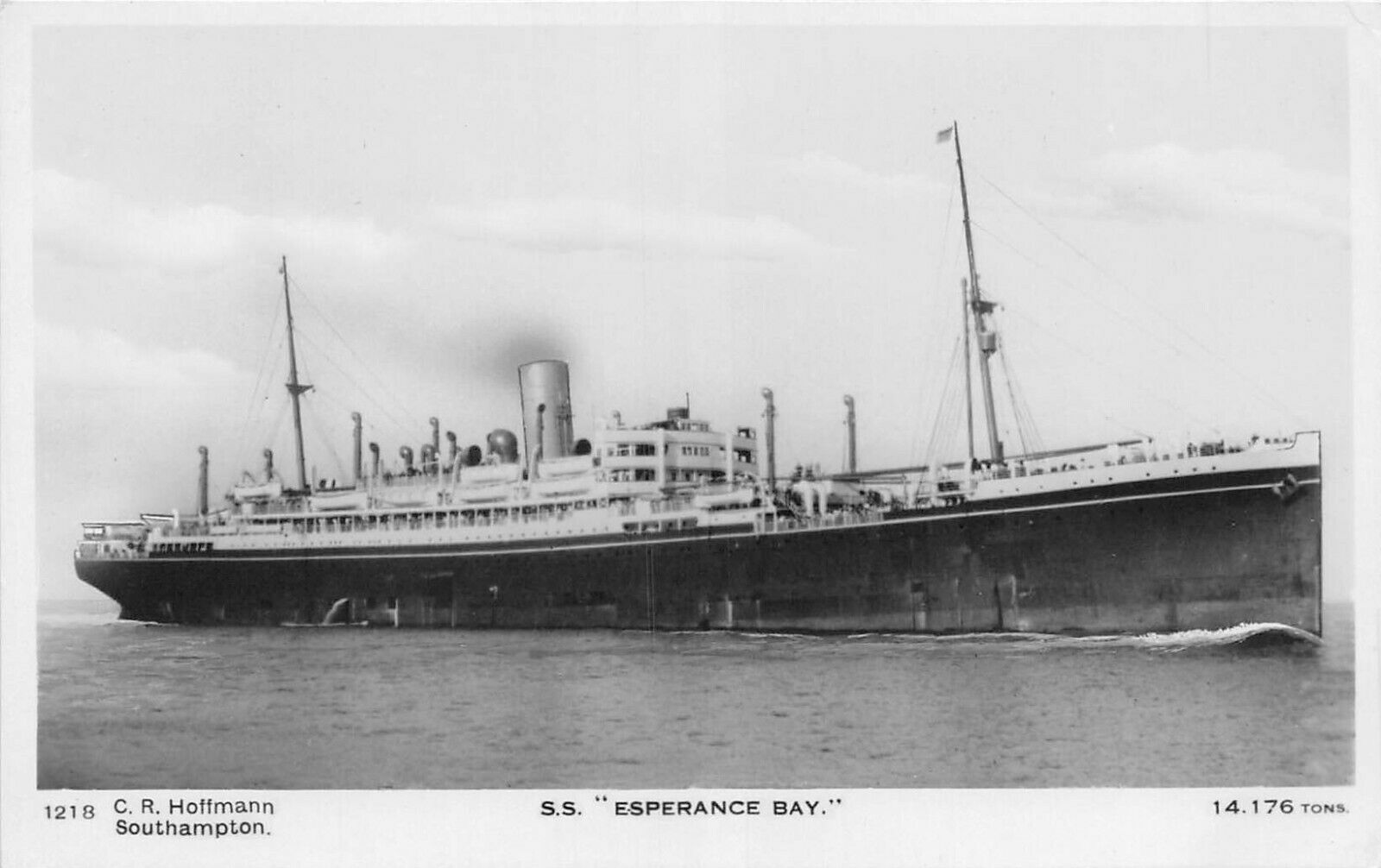
- SS Esperance Bay c. 1930 in Southampton

History

United Kingdom
- Name: Esperance Bay; Arawa
- Namesake: Esperance Bay, Western Australia
- Owner: Commonwealth Line, White Star Line, Shaw, Savill & Albion Line
- Port of registry: Lloyd's Register
- Builder: William Beardmore & Company, Glasgow
- Yard number: 617
- Launched: 15 December 1921
- Fate: Scrapped Newport, Wales May 1955

General characteristics
- Type: Twin-screw steamer ocean liner
- Tonnage: 14,462 GRT (in 1938); 8,598 NRT (in 1938)
- Length: 530 ft 8 in (161.75 m) overall
- Beam: 68 ft 2 in (20.78 m)
- Depth of hold: 33 ft (10 m)
- Propulsion: Two oil-burning steam turbines
- Speed: 16 knots (30 km/h; 18 mph)

SS Esperance Bay, later SS Arawa and HMS Arawa, was a British merchant ocean liner, launched in December 1921, which saw service mostly between England and the Far East and Oceania until scrapped in 1955.

The ship was named for Esperance Bay, which had itself been named for the French ship Espérance (1781).

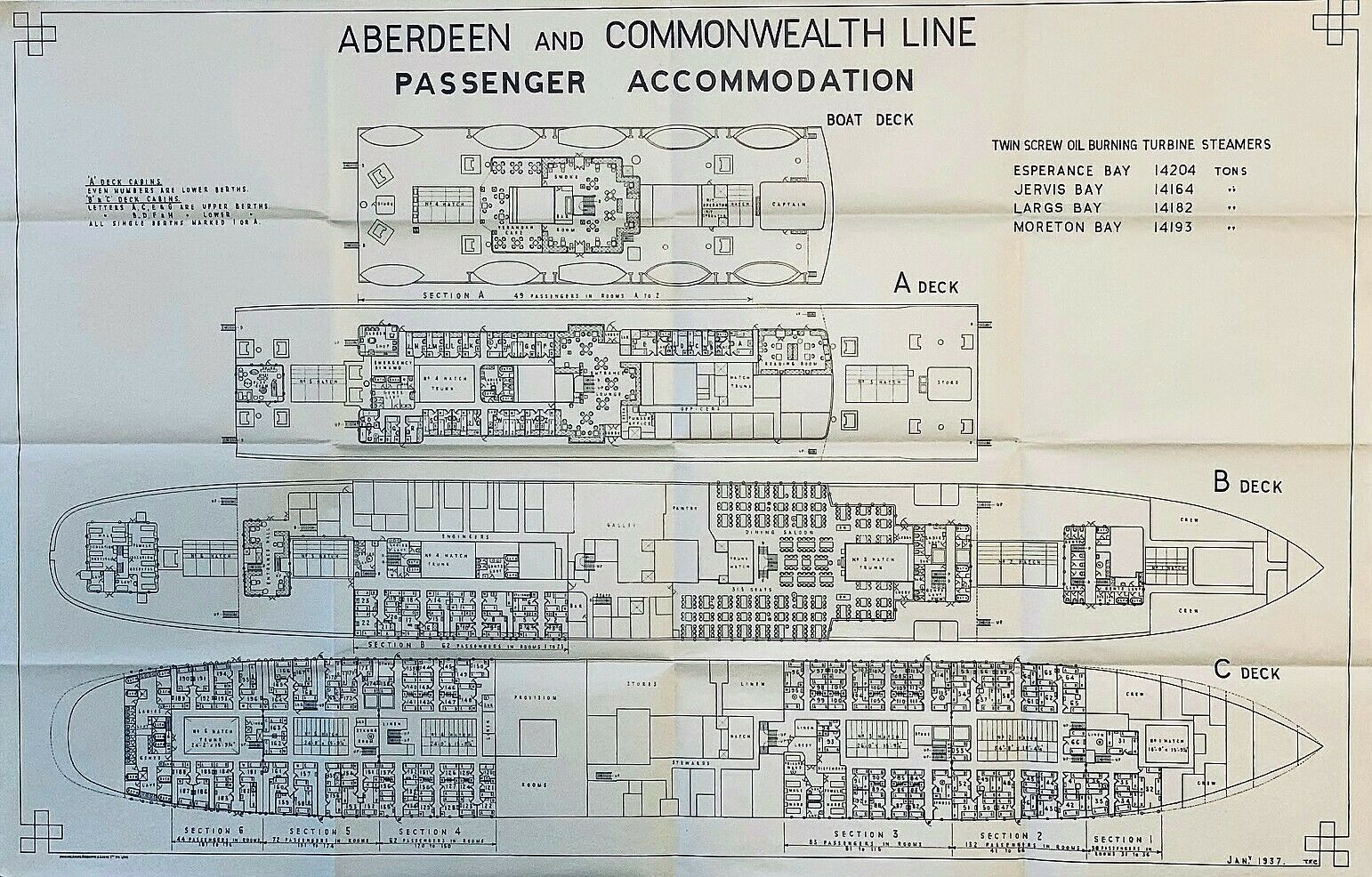
The five Bay-class ships were built to an identical design, each with three decks, A, B, and C, with the Boat Deck above them. Passengers travelled together, in a single class.

When her sister ship Moreton Bay was launched by Vickers Shipbuilding & Engineering on 21 April 1921, it was reported that Largs Bay and Esperance Bay were under construction by William Beardmore & Company for the Commonwealth Line, Australia.

Altogether, there were to be five Bay-class ships, each named after a bay in Australia, and built to an identical design, and they were planned for the launching of a new regular steamship service to Australia. While they were planned as single-class ships, they also had "a limited number of 2-berth first-class State Rooms, each with private bath".

Esperance Bay was launched at Dalmuir on 15 December 1921 and was designed to carry 700 passengers. On 10 July 1922, after being fitted out, the ship steamed down the River Clyde, ready for her first scheduled voyage to Australia. She was registered in London. On 1 August, she duly set off from Tilbury for Brisbane, carrying the first contingent of women emigrants for Australia under the Overseas Settlement Act Scheme.

In May 1928, the ship and her four sisters, including Hobsons Bay and the future HMS Jervis Bay, were sold to the White Star Line who operated them under one of their subsidiaries.

In July 1935, as Esperance Bay, the vessel took part as a guest ship in the Silver Jubilee of George V review of the fleet at Spithead.

In 1936, Esperance Bay was bought by the Shaw, Savill & Albion Line, of London, was extensively refitted on the Clyde for the direct route to New Zealand through the Panama Canal, and was renamed SS Arawa. This was reported as "revival of a famous name", which was that of the company's SS Arawa, lost in World War I. Confusingly, her sister ship Hobsons Bay was then renamed as Esperance Bay.

When World War II broke out in September 1939, Arawa was at Wellington in New Zealand. She was quickly requisitioned by the Admiralty and in October was sent to Sydney for conversion to an armed merchant cruiser called HMS Arawa. From there, she was posted to the China station with HMS Liverpool. The ship served in this role until 1941, when she was transferred to the Ministry of War Transport and went to Birkenhead and was converted to a troop ship, with bunks for transporting up to 1,850 men. In 1942, she took forces to Durban, returning home to England by way of Buenos Aires with a cargo of meat. In November 1942, she took part in Operation Torch as a troop ship, landing soldiers in North Africa. In 1943, she was making crossings of the North Atlantic, to bring American forces to Britain for Operation Bolero. After Victory in Europe Day, 8 May 1945, she was sent to the Mediterranean for the repatriation of prisoners of war, and from there was posted onwards to Bombay, with a view to being used in the ongoing Pacific War.

Following the Surrender of Japan on 15 August, towards the end of October 1945 Arawa docked in Shanghai, sent there to repatriate some 600 British subjects to England. Most, including the future actor Peter Wyngarde and the future author James Graham Ballard, had been liberated from the Lunghua Civilian Assembly Centre. Arawa made the voyage to Southampton in November and December, carrying 582 British passengers.

On 7 February 1946, Arawa returned to her pre-war life, steaming to New Zealand by way of Panama. In August 1947, she was put to work to re-open the route between England, Cape Town, and New Zealand. On 4 May 1954, in the Thames Estuary, she collided with a steamer called Borde, and was damaged. The other vessel's bosun was reported to be missing, but he was later found on Arawa, having jumped from one to the other in his underwear at the moment of collision.

Arawa made her last voyage in December 1954. From May 1955, she was scrapped at Cashmore's in Newport, Wales.

== In popular culture ==
Arawa appears in the last chapter of Empire of the Sun, in which the character Jim, based on the novel's author James Graham Ballard, boards with his mother and reflects on his life after the war. This scene was omitted from the 1987 film adaptation.
