= Play of the Week (TV series) =

British TV drama series (ITV, 1966–1967)

- Country of origin: United Kingdom
- Original language: English

Original release
- Network: ITV
- Release: 1955 – 1967

Play of the Week is a 90-minute British television anthology series produced for the ITV network by a variety of companies including Granada Television, Associated-Rediffusion, ATV and Anglia Television.

== Synopsis ==
Approximately 500 episodes aired on ITV from 1955 to 1967. The first production was Ten Minute Alibi, produced by Associated-Rediffusion on 14 May 1956 while the earliest to survive is There Was a Young Lady, broadcast live on 23 July 1956 and simultaneously telerecorded on film.

The first production not to be transmitted live was Henrik Ibsen's The Wild Duck which was also film recorded. The first to be pre-recorded on videotape was Mary Broome, a Granada production broadcast on 3 September 1958. Subsequently, only one play was transmitted live, Associated-Rediffusion's Search Party on 26 July 1960. The recording of The Liberty Man, a Granada production broadcast on 1 October 1958, contains the original advertisements during the first commercial break. The Violent Years was networked from Anglia on its opening night, 27 October 1959, and exists at the University of East Anglia.

The series included You in Your Small Corner by Barry Reckord, first broadcast in June 1962, which was an early taboo breaking drama depicting lovers from white and black backgrounds kissing. This also survives.

Other productions included:

- Look Back in Anger - produced by Granada, broadcast 28 November 1956, does not exist
- Morning's at Seven - produced by H.M. Tennent for ATV, broadcast 21 August 1957, does not exist
- Death of a Salesman - produced by Granada, broadcast 27 November 1957, does not exist
- The Importance of Being Earnest - produced by Associated-Rediffusion, broadcast 26 March 1958, does not exist
- Playboy of the Western World - produced by Granada, broadcast 26 November 1958, does not exist
- The Skin of Our Teeth - produced by Granada, broadcast 17 March 1959, Acts I & II exist, Act III's status is unknown
- South - produced by Granada, broadcast 24 November 1959, earliest known drama to feature a gay story line. Available to watch via BFI
- The Member of the Wedding - produced by Granada, broadcast 16 February 1960, does not exist
- The House of Bernarda Alba - produced by Associated-Rediffusion, broadcast 23 February 1960, does not exist
- The Birthday Party - produced by Associated-Rediffusion, broadcast 22 March 1960, does not exist
- I Remember Mama - produced by Associated-Rediffusion, broadcast 27 June 1961, does not exist
- The Lark - produced by Granada, broadcast 28 August 1962, does not exist
- The Rose Tattoo - produced by Granada, broadcast 13 January 1964, does not exist
- The Rules of the Game, broadcast 15 February 1965, with Anthony Quayle, Peter Wyngarde, and Gwen Watford
- Come Back, Little Sheba - produced by Anglia, broadcast 8 March 1965, does not exist
- A Choice of Kings - produced by Rediffusion, broadcast 11 October 1966, survives

== Directors ==
Among its directors were Tony Richardson, Peter Wood, Peter Brook, Vivian Matalon, and Desmond Davis.

== Stars ==
Notable guest stars included Sean Connery, Michael Caine, Peter O'Toole, Laurence Olivier, Vivien Leigh, Peggy Ashcroft, Maggie Smith, Julie Christie, Alan Bates, Judi Dench, Deborah Kerr, Paul Scofield, Laurence Harvey, Glenda Jackson, Susannah York, Leslie Caron, Richard Harris, Edith Evans, James Mason, Claire Bloom, David McCallum, Donald Sutherland, John Gielgud, Oliver Reed, Mel Ferrer, Diana Rigg, Marius Goring, Felicia Montealegre Bernstein, Margaret Whiting and Peter Sallis
