= Overseas Press Club – Exclusive! =

British anthology series

- Genre: Adventure
- Directed by: A. Edward Sutherland; David MacDonald
- Country of origin: United Kingdom
- Original language: English
- No. of series: 1
- No. of episodes: 13

Production
- Producers: Bernard Luber; David MacDonald; Maurie M. Suess
- Running time: 30 minutes
- Production companies: Ardleigh Films; Associated British-Pathé

Original release
- Network: ITV
- Release: 15 June – 17 September 1957

Overseas Press Club – Exclusive! is a British adventure anthology television series that first aired on ITV in 1957. Each episode featured a different story based on a purportedly real case involving foreign correspondents of the Overseas Press Club. It was shot at ABPC's Elstree Studios.

Actors who appeared on the show included Ralph Bellamy, Phyllis Calvert, Faith Domergue, Nicole Maurey, Claude Dauphin, Kieron Moore, Eric Pohlmann, John Laurie, Leonard Sachs, Ferdy Mayne, Stratford Johns, Lee Montague, Peter Wyngarde, Anton Diffring, Julia Arnall, André Morell, Stanley Meadows, Jack MacGowran, Helen Haye, Betty McDowall, Alan Tilvern, Austin Trevor, Nigel Stock and Lloyd Lamble.

== Bibliography ==
- Noble, Peter (1960). British Film and Television Year Book, 1959-60. BA Publication.
