= A Touch of Brimstone =

- The Avengers episode
- Episode no.: Season 4 Episode 21
- Directed by: James Hill
- Written by: Brian Clemens
- Original air dates: 15 February 1966 (Scottish Television); 19 February 1966 (ABC Weekend TV)

Guest appearances
- Peter Wyngarde; Colin Jeavons; Carol Cleveland; Robert Cawdron

Episode chronology
← Previous "The Danger Makers"	Next → "What the Butler Saw"

"A Touch of Brimstone" is the twenty-first episode of the fourth series of the 1960s British spy television series The Avengers, starring Patrick Macnee as John Steed and Diana Rigg as Emma Peel. It was filmed in the third and fourth weeks of December 1965, and was first broadcast on British television on 15 February 1966. The episode was directed by James Hill and written by Brian Clemens. The plot involves Steed and Peel infiltrating the Hellfire Club (which replicates the historic Hellfire Club) whilst investigating harmful pranks on high profile political and business figures.

The episode contained visual reference to sado-masochistic pornography, and featured Rigg wearing a kinky "Queen of Sin" costume, which she designed herself. Consequently, it was not shown on American television; a scene where Peter Wyngarde's character The Honorable John Cleverly Cartney attempting to whip Peel was cut down for some UK screenings. "A Touch of Brimstone" was the most watched episode of The Avengers on its original showing.

== Plot ==
Steed and Peel are investigating Cartney, who is suspected of involvement in pranks on high profile political and business figures. Through subterfuge, Peel connects with Cartney, who is attracted to her. She overhears Darcy arriving and informing Cartney that he has arranged another prank. Steed infiltrates Darcy's residence and, after knocking out Cartney's housekeeper, Horace, finds a pair of rubber scissors. Real scissors are used on an electrified ribbon by an official opening the "International Friendship Club", killing him.

Darcy did not expect to be involved in murder and is distraught. Steed gets him drunk and, under the pretence of knowing him from a party, learns of the Hellfire Club, which is responsible for the pranks. Peel visits Cartney and discovers information that leads to the Club, an organization that engages in orgiastic rituals and which revels in "ultimate sins", replicating the historic Hellfire Club.

During a Club party, Darcy arrives and demands a meeting with the superiors on the "circle of justice", asking why they plotted a murder and implicated him. The centre of the circle opens as a trapdoor and Darcy is killed. On Peel's recommendation, Steed applies to join the Hellfire Club and is given two membership tests; firstly drinking a large amount of alcohol (which he does easily) and then removing a pea guarded by an axe-wielding member. Rather than trying to grab the pea, like another member who lost two fingers, Steed blows the pea away as the axe falls. Steed is welcomed by the group and overhears that the Club is planning a coup which will have the "whole country up in arms". The following day, Steed and Peel attend the next event, and spot a cache of explosives. Steed questions a drunk girl and deduces that the Club intend to blow up Culverston House, where three foreign leaders are staying. Peel re-enters in a "Queen of Sin" outfit, holding a snake. Cartney tells the group "She's yours to do with as you will". Members carry Peel, throwing rose petals on her. As the revellers watch a fight, Horace recognizes Steed and exposes him as a spy. Steed wins the ensuing sword duel against the club expert. Peel defeats two members laying out explosives underground, before being attacked with a whip by Cartney, who drops to his death through the trapdoor when his whip catches the switch.

== Cast and crew ==
The cast for the episode were:

- Patrick Macnee as John Steed
- Diana Rigg as Emma Peel
- Peter Wyngarde as The Honorable John Cleverly Cartney
- Colin Jeavons as Lord Darcy
- Carol Cleveland as Sara Bradley
- Robert Cawdron as Horace
- Jeremy Young as Willy Frant
- Michael Latimer as Roger Winthrop
- Bill Wallis as Tubby Bunn
- Steve Plytas as Kartovski
- Art Thomas as Pierre
- Alf Joint as Big Man
- Bill Reed as Huge Man
- Alan Meacham as Theatre-goer (uncredited)
- Lewis Alexander as VIP (uncredited)

Production crew included:

- Writer: Brian Clemens
- Director: James Hill
- Producer: Julian Wintle
- Music: Laurie Johnson
- Photography: Alan Hume
- Art Director: Harry Pottle
- Film editor: Richard Best
- Designer for Diana Rigg's wardrobe: John Bates
- Designer for Diana Rigg's shoes: Edward Rayne
- Assistant director: Frank Hollands
- Camera operator: Geoffrey Godar
- Hairdresser: Pearl Orton
- Sound editor: Jack Knight

== Production ==
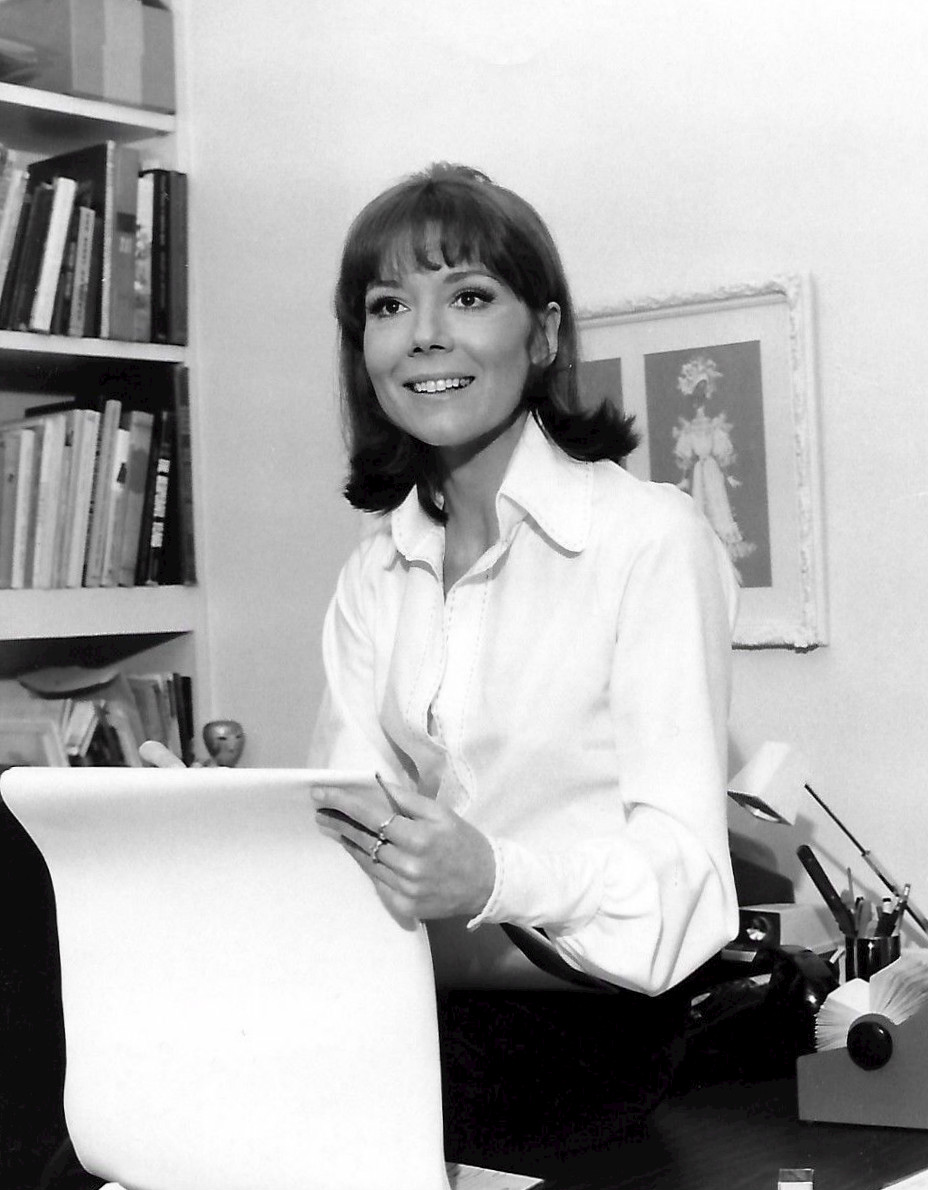
Diana Rigg (pictured in 1973)

Production for the fourth series of The Avengers began in May 1965, with a shooting schedule of ten days and a budget of £30,000 per episode, although many of the episodes ran over schedule, averaging 14 days to complete. Rigg and Macnee worked fourteen-hour days, and each had around 60 pages of dialogue to learn each week.

"A Touch of Brimstone" was filmed in the third and fourth weeks of December 1965, with a working title of "The Hellfire Club". It was written by Brian Clemens and directed by James Hill. The episode was first broadcast by Scottish Television on Tuesday 15 February 1966, and it was broadcast in the London and Tyne-Tees regions on 18 February. ABC Weekend Television, who commissioned the show, broadcast it in its own regions four days later on Saturday 19 February, as the twenty-first episode of the fourth series. During Rigg's time on the show, each episode had a two-line subtitle after the main title. For "A Touch of Brimstone" the subtitle was "In which Steed Joins The Hellfire Club – And Emma Becomes the Queen of Sin". When broadcast in France, the episode was titled "Le Club de L'Enfer."

== Reception and influence ==
The episode received the highest UK viewing figures for any episode of The Avengers, attracting an estimated 8.4 million viewers, which made it the fifth most-viewed programme of that week. Michael Billington wrote in The Stage that the episode had "just the right mixture of extravagance and menace". He praised the lead actors, calling Macnee's playing of Steed "unimprovable", describing Wyngarde's part an "immaculate performance", and saying that although Rigg's portrayal of Emma Peel has received a mixed reception, he felt that she had "made a definable character out of Emma Peel, sometimes without much help from the scriptwriters".

The episode is known for the scenes in which Peel wears a kinky "Queen of Sin" costume (which Rigg designed herself), complete with a dog collar with three-inch spikes, whalebone corset, and high leather boots. Rigg also carried a large snake. The members of the Hellfire Club have been described as engaging in "uninhibited debauchery". Towards the end of the episode, Cartney, wielding a whip, confronts Peel. Clemens recalled in 2000 that there had been "four or five" lashes of the whip in the final cut. The full scene was included on a 1993 video release from Lumiere Pictures, from which the media historian James Chapman counted "up to 12 cracks" but noted that at no point was the whip seen to have made contact with Peel. Due to the content, the episode was not broadcast when The Avengers aired on American network television; it did air on British television, but with the whipping scene edited down to one crack of the whip in some ITV regions. The full scene was included on a 1993 video release from Lumiere Pictures.

The Media historian James Chapman wrote in 2002 of the episode, "With its visual references to sado-masochistic pornography", it was predictable that "A Touch of Brimstone" would experience censorship difficulties with the ITV network, and also not be broadcast in America. Chapman also considered that the episode highlighted inconsistencies in the way that women were portrayed in The Avengers, as although Peel is dressed as a dominatrix, Cartney tells his fellow club members to "do with her as you will" and she is taken away by them seemingly for their own agenda. Her escape is not shown, but she next appears fighting one opponent and then in the confrontation against Cartney, during which he attacks her with a whip. Chapman argues that Peel "is therefore made to play the roles of both dominatrix and victimised woman ... [she] embodies aspects of both dominant and passive femininity."

The Women's Studies scholar Sherrie A. Inness wrote in 1998 that the episode provides an example of how The Avengers "emphasized women's sexuality ... [by having] Emma expose her curvaceous form". Inness describes the Queen of Sin outfit and argues that this emphasis on the character's sexuality "reduced her tough image and showed viewers that, despite her karate abilities, she was all woman." Considering the character of Peel in the series overall, Inness concludes that although the character, with her combat abilities, was an unusual depiction of women at the time, and appealed to female viewers, the character nevertheless "helped to reinforce stereotypes about women." In contrast, in 2005 the film critic Anne Billson wrote that Peel's character demonstrated that heroines "could be sexy without being reduced to a dumb sex object" and notes that in A Touch of Brimstone, Peel's expression demonstrates her repugnance at a remark from Cartney that women are "mere vessels of pleasure". Journalist Maria Alvarez argued in New Statesman in 1998 that there was an "unyielding hardness rather than feminine softness" to Peel's demeanour while wearing the outfit. Alvarez commented that the combination of "danger and eroticism, seemed as integral to [Peel's] style and personality as the smooth leather and kinky boots that encased her were testaments to self-containment and enigma" and that Peel was an exemplar of a modern action woman.

Tom Lisanti and Louis Paul, authors of Film Fatales: Women in Espionage Films and Television, 1962–1973 (2002) cited the episode as one of Diana Rigg's finest. It was rated as one of the five best episodes of the fourth series by Paul Cornell, Martin Day and Keith Topping in The Avengers Dossier (1998). The authors wrote that it was the zenith of the series, describing it as camp, "and with the magnificent OTT [over the top] grandeur of Wyngarde. One laughs at the sheer verve of it".

This episode was Chris Claremont's inspiration for the Hellfire Club in Marvel Comics' "X-Men", in particular the story arc in Uncanny X-Men #132–134. Hellfire Club member Jason Wyngarde's name and likeness is based on Peter Wyngarde, who was later known for the role of Jason King.

It was reported in 1993 that fans were still sending Rigg postcards of her dressed as the Queen of Sin to be autographed.
