= Union Church (Shanghai) =

Former Protestant church in Shanghai, China

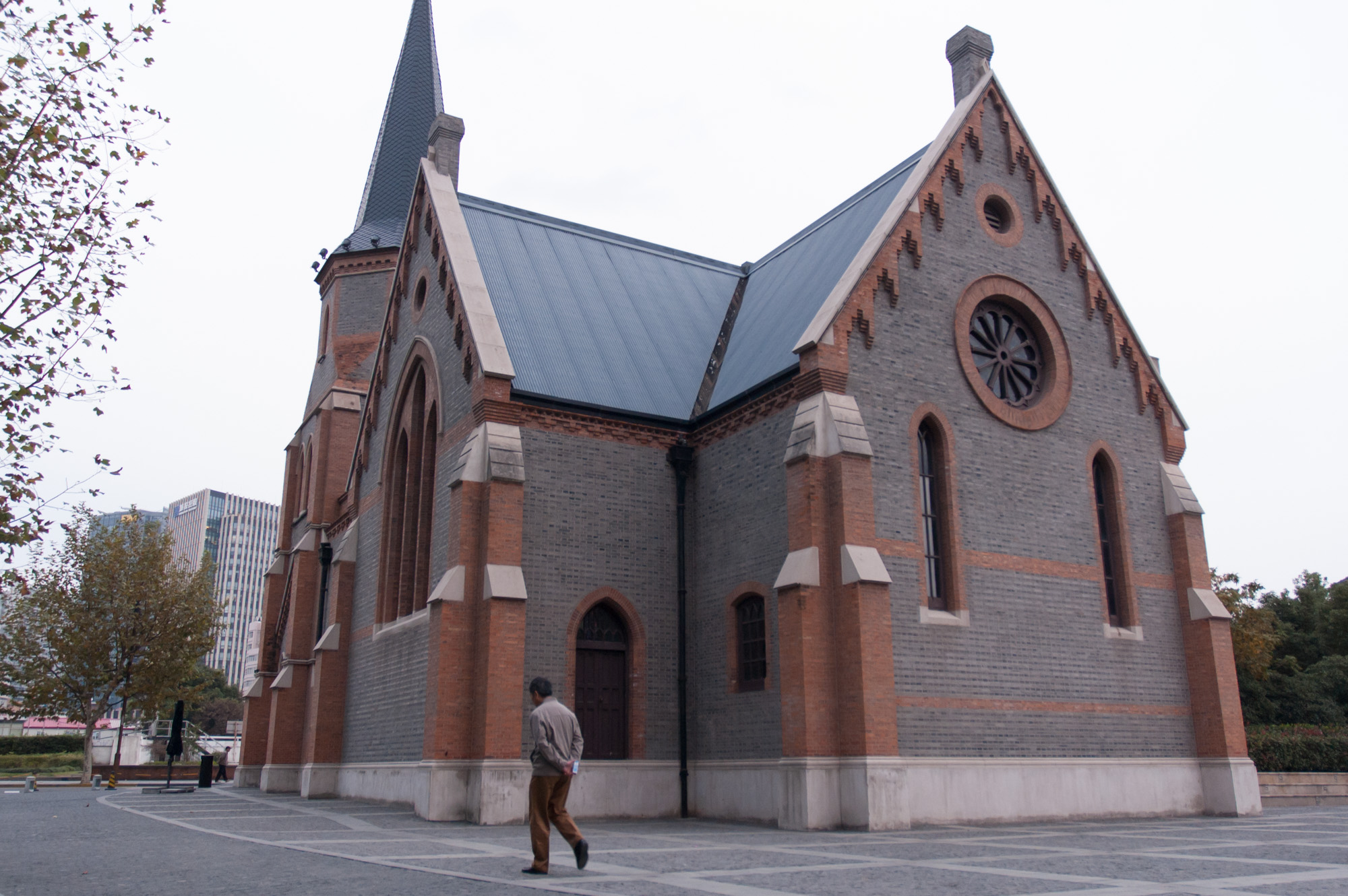
The restored church in 2014

The Union Church is a former Protestant church on the Bund in Shanghai, built in the Gothic Revival style in 1886.

== Origins ==
For ease of travel, most 19th-century churches in Shanghai were built on rivers, unlike European churches, which are usually on a street or a marketplace. The Union Church building on Suzhou Creek and Suzhou Road is now the last surviving waterside church in downtown Shanghai. The façade is designed to be seen from a boat.

The church was planned in 1884 as a house of worship for Christians who did not belong to the Anglican Holy Trinity Cathedral, Shanghai, and had been meeting at the house of an English Congregationalist missionary, Walter Henry Medhurst, which became too small as the congregation grew. In 1885, the church was built on the present site, near the British Consulate.

The North China Daily News said in 1886 that the congregation was "neither large nor wealthy, and with no nucleus of a building fund", which was why the new church was "neither tall nor grand". A fund-raising bazaar held on March 29, 1886, raised more than US$500.

== Design ==
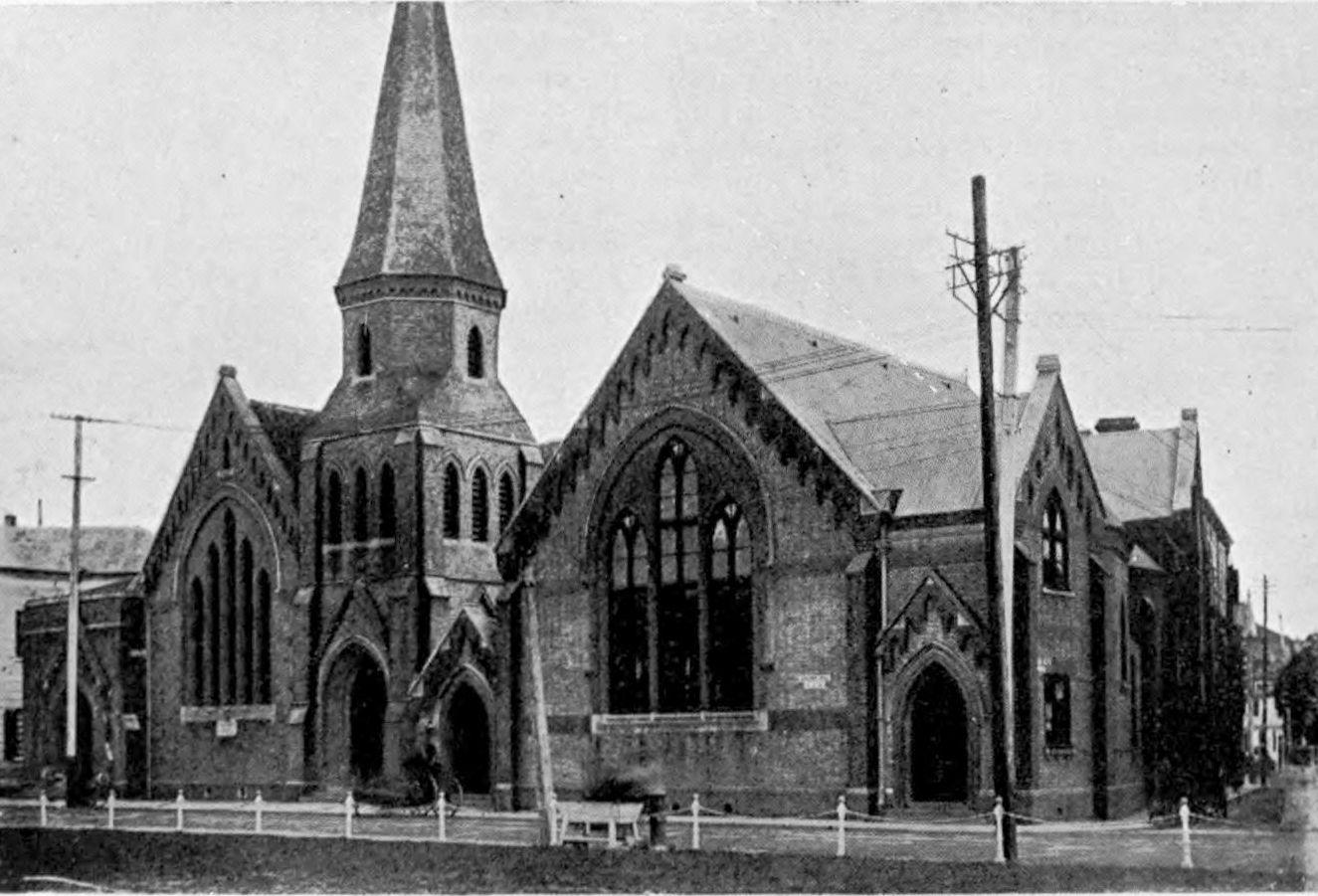
The church before the Second World War

The church was designed by a British architect, W. M. Dowdall, one of the few Royal Institute of British Architects members in Shanghai, and built in red and gray brick in the Gothic Revival and late Romanesque styles. The brickwork has echoes of the shikumen of the city’s traditional stone-gate houses. The bell tower stood between two aisles, the only one to do so among the city’s hundreds of Christian churches.

When built, the steeple, 33 metres high, was the highest structure on Suzhou Creek.

== History ==
When opened, the church became an important community hall as well as a place of worship, and in 1920 Bertrand Russell gave a speech there. By 1918, the building was in a poor condition and was rebuilt to the original plan. However, in 1937 the western aisle was destroyed in Japanese bombing and was never rebuilt.

In 1949, the church was converted to be used as the offices of the Shanghai No. 2 Illuminating Lamps Factory. A new commercial front was added and the steeple was taken down.

In 2005, thanks to the Waitanyuan project to restore the Bund area, Professor Chang Qing of the Tongji University led a team aiming to restore the church. Sadly, it was badly damaged in a fire on January 24, 2007, when the surviving eastern aisle was lost, and the restoration project was set back by years, but continued, and was finished in 2010.

The Union Church now stands again and is used for exhibitions and events. The interior is darkened by stained glass. In 2012, it served as a venue for the 9th Shanghai Biennale, with an exhibition of the art of Vincent Ward.
