= Chen Tiemei =

Chinese physicist and archaeologist

- 陈铁梅
- Born: June 30, 1935; Shanghai, Republic of China
- Died: October 25, 2018 (aged 83); Beijing, China
- Occupations: Physicist, archaeologist, professor, journal editor, writer
- Known for: Pioneering archaeological science, founder of Chinese quantitative archaeology

Academic background
- Education: Peking University; Leningrad University

Academic work
- Discipline: Physics, archaeology
- Sub-discipline: Archaeological science, quantitative archaeology, geochronology, radio carbon dating, liquid scintillation counting
- Institutions: Dalian Institute of Technology; Peking University; German Archaeological Institute
- Main interests: Paleolithic China, paleoanthropology, Chinese ceramics, Quaternary science

Chen Tiemei (Chinese: 陈铁梅; 30 June 1935 – 25 October 2018) was a Chinese physicist and archaeologist, considered a pioneer in scientific archaeology and a founder of quantitative archaeology in China. He was a professor and Director of the Scientific Archaeology Laboratory at Peking University.

== Life and career ==
Chen was born on 30 June 1935 in Shanghai, Republic of China. After graduating from Shanghai High School in 1952, he tested into the Department of Physics of Peking University. In August 1954, he was sent by the Chinese government to study physics at Leningrad University in the Soviet Union.

Upon graduation in 1959, Chen returned to China to teach at the Dalian Institute of Technology. In 1961, he became a faculty member of the Department of Technical Physics at Peking University. In 1973, he was transferred to the Department of Archaeology and served as Director of the Scientific Archaeology Laboratory. He became a full professor of archaeology in 1989 and a doctoral advisor in 1994. He was proficient in English and Russian, and taught himself German and Japanese. He was a corresponding member of the German Archaeological Institute.

Chen died on 25 October 2018 in Beijing, at the age of 83.

== Contributions ==
A pioneer in scientific archaeology, Chen established China's first radiocarbon dating laboratory using liquid scintillation counting at Peking University. He was instrumental in establishing laboratories and training personnel for carbon-14 dating in China. He dated more than 20 palaeolithic and paleoanthropological sites, and proposed the first chronology for Palaeolithic China. From the early 1990s, Chen pioneered and developed scientific methods to determine the geographical origins of ancient ceramics and porcelain.

Chen published more than 30 papers in influential journals including Nature and Acta Archaeologica Sinica. He served as an editor of domestic and international journals including Quaternary Science Reviews and Quaternary Geochronology.

After retiring from Peking University, Chen dedicated himself to writing. He published the monographs Quantitative Archaeology (定量考古学) in 2005, Scientific Archaeology (科技考古学) in 2008, and Concise Statistics for Archaeology (简明考古统计学) in 2013.
