= Shanghai High School =

Coordinates: 31.141°N 121.432°E

- 上海市上海中学

Location
- 989 Baise Road; 400 Shangzhong Road; Xuhui District, Shanghai; China

Information
- Type: Public
- Motto: 读书，明理，做人，成材 (Study, sensibility, morals, success)
- Established: 1865
- Founder: Ding Richang
- Principal: Feng Zhigang
- Faculty: 178
- Enrollment: 1200 (2024)
- Campus: 56 acres (230,000 m^{2})
- Website: Shanghai High School （English Version） International Division

Shanghai High School (Chinese: 上海市上海中学) is a public high school in Shanghai, China. Founded in 1865 as Longmen Academy (龙门书院) by Shanghai Intendant Ding Richang, and later becoming the namesake high school of Shanghai in 1949, it is considered the city's most prestigious high school, and hailed as one of the "Big Four" high schools of Jiangnan.

The high school's campus sprawls 340 mu (approx. 56 acres) across the Changqiao subdistrict of Xuhui District, southwest of the Shanghai Botanical Garden and west of East China University of Science and Technology.

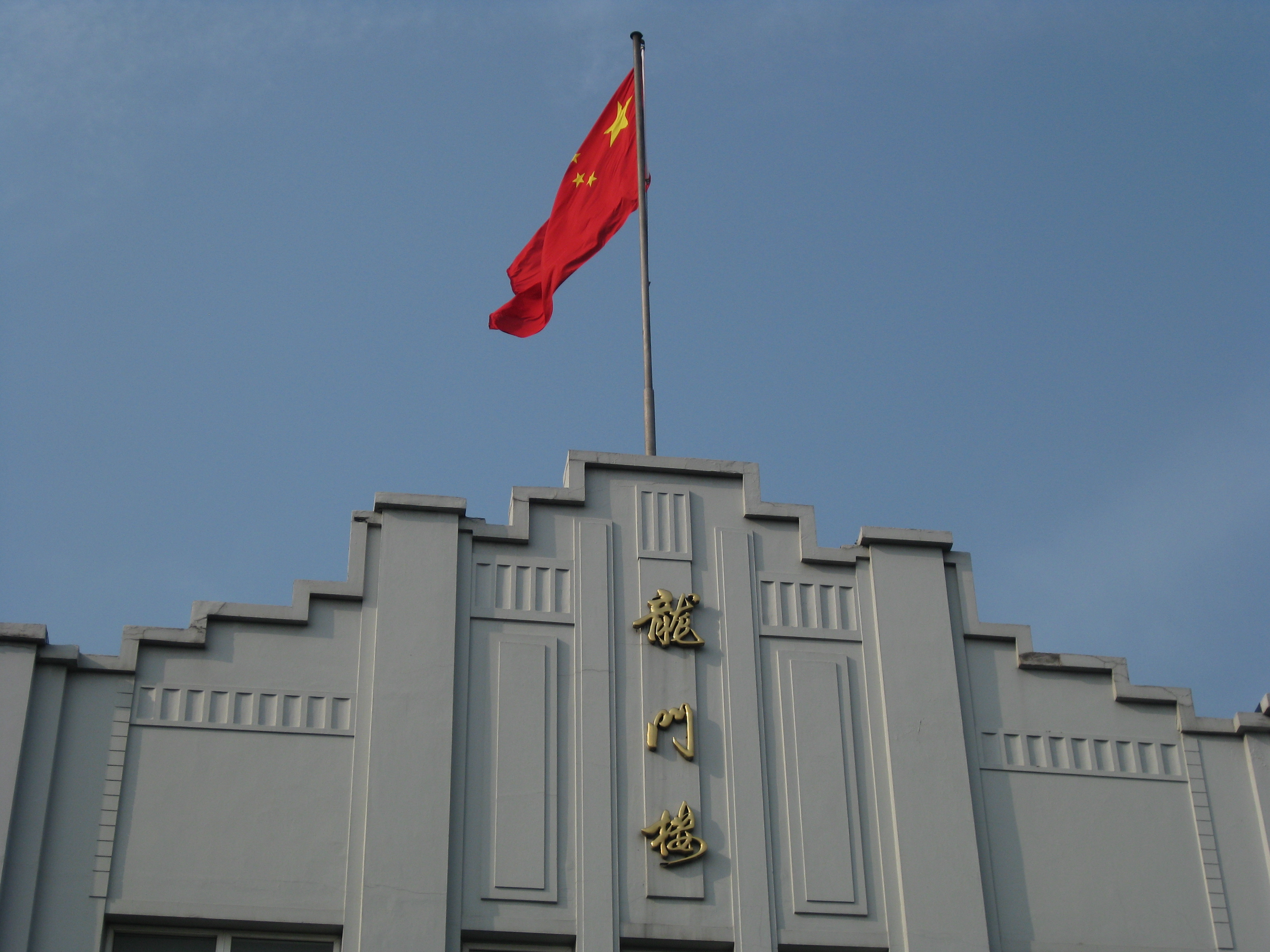
上海中学 - Shanghai High School

Its junior department was separated to Shanghai Huayu Private School (simplified Chinese: 上海市民办华育中学; traditional Chinese: 上海市民办华育中學) in 1999. Shanghai High School's sister school in Hong Kong is the St. Paul's Co-educational College. Its sister school in Paris is the Lycée Louis-le-Grand.

== History ==
The school was established in 1865 by Ding Richang under the name Longmen Academy (龙门书院; 龍門書院). Initially, Ding borrowed the Zhanhuatang Building of Ningzhu Academy to instruct, located in Huangpu District (nowadays Ninghe Road). In 1867, Yin Baoshi purchased a piece of land with a lump sum of donated silver on the original site of the Xianmian Ancestral Shrine (先棉祠), nowadays off Shangwen by Lujiabang Road in Huangpu District. Nowadays, a historical residential block, Longmencun (namesake of the original Academy) sits on the block.

In September 1927, educator Zheng Tonghe began his tenure as principal of the school, then named Kiangsu Provincial Shanghai High School (江蘇省立上海中學). Starting from 1930, Zheng sought a new location to establish campus, as the Shangwen Road campus was falling out of use and its position in the city made expansion difficult. Zheng's search resumed as Japanese Imperial Army withdrew from Shanghai after the Songhu Ceasefire Agreement in May 1932, and eventually purchased 460 mu of land in the Wujiaxiang off Humin Road, Caojing District (nowadays Shangzhong Road, Xuhui District) in Spring 1934. The Auditorium, Longmen Building, and Xianmian Building, all built in the Art Deco style, finished construction in 1936.

After the Japanese attacked on Pearl Harbor in 1941, the Imperial Army occupied the Shanghai foreign concessions, including the French and International settlements, which were the only parts of Shanghai not occupied previously after the Battle of Shanghai. Starting from December 1941, the Wujiaxiang campus turned into the Lunghwa Civilian Assembly Center, an internment camp that held foreign citizens previously living in the concessions. Longmen Building became F block, the administrative block that housed camp commandant Tomohiko Hayashi on the third floor. Xianmian Building became E block, which accommodated internees.

Longmen Building at sunset

From 1937, the school evacuated to the French Concession (on nowadays Shaoxing Road and Shunchang Road), and instructed continued. In 1942, to avoid control by the Wang Jinwei puppet government, the school changed its name to Huxin Private School (私立滬新中學). The school reverted to the previous name under Kiangsu province in October 1945, and again changed its name to Shanghai High School (上海市上海中學) in June 1949 under the Shanghai Municipal People's Government. The school library finished construction the same year.

The school ceased operations in 1970 due to the Chinese Cultural Revolution. It resumed operations in 1978.

In June 1993, Shanghai High School became the first Chinese school to start an international division. In 1995, Shanghai High School International Division became the first in China to offer an International Baccalaureate program. More than 1750 students from the United States, Japan, Korea, Canada, England, Italy, Germany, Australia, Yugoslavia, Iran, Egypt, Venezuela, Hong Kong, Macau, and Taiwan represent just some of the fifty plus countries and regions represented at Shanghai High School International Division. In 2005, 37.5% graduates entered top 20 universities in the US.

In 2003, Shanghai High School became a UNESCO associated school. That October, it became the first "Shanghai Municipal Demonstration School."

== Administration ==
=== Principals ===
- Tang Shouqian (汤寿潜)
- Yang Xianjiang (杨贤江)
- Ou Yuanhuai (欧元怀)
- Zheng Tonghe (郑通和)
- Wang Shikan (王士侃)
- Wu Ruinian (吴瑞年)
- Shen Yizhen (沈亦珍)
- Sun Fuxi (孙福熙)
- Chen Guangzu (陈光祖)
- Ye Keping (叶克平)
- Bai Zaili (白宰理)
- Fang Qi'ao (方启敖)
- Tang Shengchang (唐盛昌)
- Feng Zhigang (冯志刚, current principal)

== International division ==
Shanghai High School International Division (abbreviated as SHSID; Chinese: 上海中学国际部) is an international school in Shanghai, China. Founded in 1993, it is the international division of Shanghai High School, a public high school in Shanghai. The school offers instruction from grades 1 through 12, and has over 3,300 students from 44 countries and regions.

== Notable people ==
Alumni include over 100 provincial level or higher leaders, 29 People's Liberation Army generals, and 57 Chinese Academy of Sciences members.

=== Alumni ===
- Zeng Qinghong: Vice President of the People's Republic of China (2003－2008)
- Li Yuanchao: Vice President of the People's Republic of China (2013－2018)
- Qian Liren: politician, diplomat, and translator, former head of the People's Daily (1985－1989)
- An Wang: computer engineer, co-founder of Wang Laboratories
- Ye Qisun: physicist
- Zhou Mingzhen: paleomammalogist and vertebrate paleontologist
- Wu-Chung Hsiang: mathematician
- Theodore Yao-tsu Wu: engineer
- Wu Shuqing: economist, president of Peking University (1989－1996)
- Ching-Lai Sheng: president of National Chiao Tung University (1972－1978)
- Tsi-an Hsia (夏濟安): scholar, elder brother of C. T. Hsia
- Liu Dalin: sociologist and sexologist
- Ni Kuang: novelist and screenwriter
- Zhou Guoping: writer, philosopher
- Cao Xihua (曹锡华): Mathematician
- Gu Hailiang: economist, president of Wuhan University
- Charles Chao: businessman, president and CEO of Sina Corp
- Chen Tiemei, archaeologist
- Kong Hong, film producer

=== Faculty ===
- Liu Yizheng: historian
- Lu Simian: historian
