= Shanghai High School International Division =

Coordinates: 31.141°N 121.432°E

- 上海中学国际部
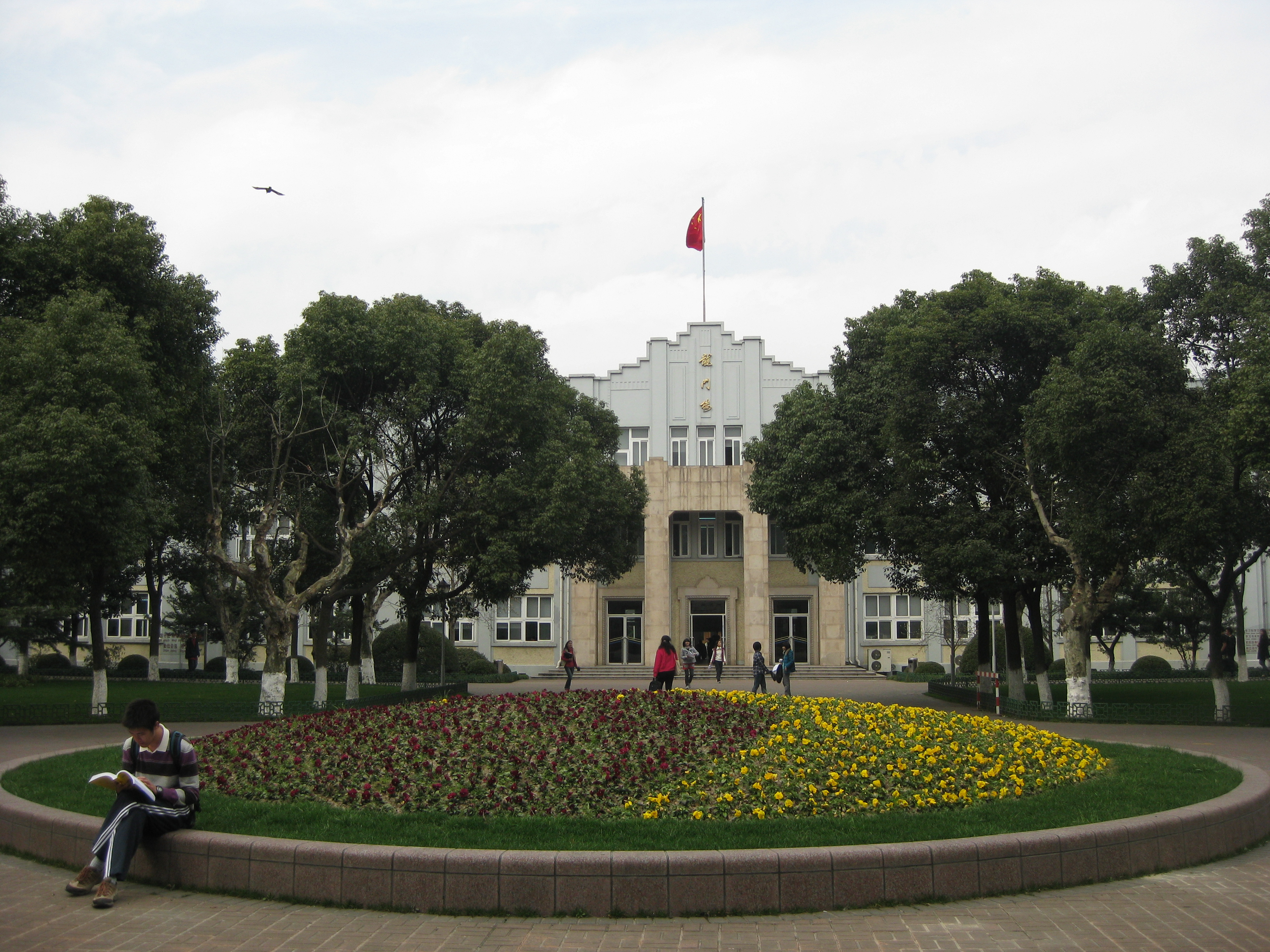

Location
- 989 Baise Road; 400 Shangzhong Road; Xuhui District, Shanghai, 200231; China

Information
- Type: International school (exam school)
- Established: 1993
- CEEB code: 694242
- Principal: Ma, Feng: (high school); Liu, Lian (middle and primary school)
- Faculty: 500+ (2025), including 140+ foreign teachers
- Grades: 1–12
- Enrollment: 3300 (2025)
- Affiliations: IBO, UNESCO
- Website: www.shsid.org

Shanghai High School International Division (abbreviated as SHSID; Chinese: 上海中学国际部) is an international school in Shanghai, China. Founded in 1993, it is the international division of Shanghai High School, a public high school in Shanghai. The school offers instruction from grades 1 through 12, and has over 3,300 students from 44 countries and regions.

Located in Xuhui District, it shares its main campus with Shanghai High School and operates additional campuses within Shanghai for lower grade levels. In 1995, it became the first school in Shanghai authorized to offer the International Baccalaureate Diploma Programme. The school also offers Advanced Placement and A-Level curricula. It is associated with UNESCO and is accredited by Cognia. It is a member of the Council of International Schools.

== History ==
In 1865, Shanghai intendant Ding Richang established Longmen Academy. The school changed names and moved campus several times, but its current site was converted by the Empire of Japan during the Second World War into the Lunghua Civilian Assembly Center, an internment camp for American and European citizens. James Graham Ballard was interned in the camp as an adolescent. His experiences there inspired the book (and subsequent film) Empire of the Sun. The school was restored after the war, and it was renamed to Shanghai High School in 1950.

On June 1, 1993, the Shanghai Municipal Education Commission approved the establishment of Shanghai High School International Division. The same year, instruction began with an initial class size of 18 students. It became the first IB World School in Shanghai in 1995, while also instructing Advanced Placement courses starting from 2008 and AS & A-Level courses from 2014. In 2018 and 2023, SHSID was accredited by Cognia, previously known as AdvancED. In 2020, the school was included in the inaugural edition of The Schools Index as one of the world's top 100 schools and one of top 10 in China.

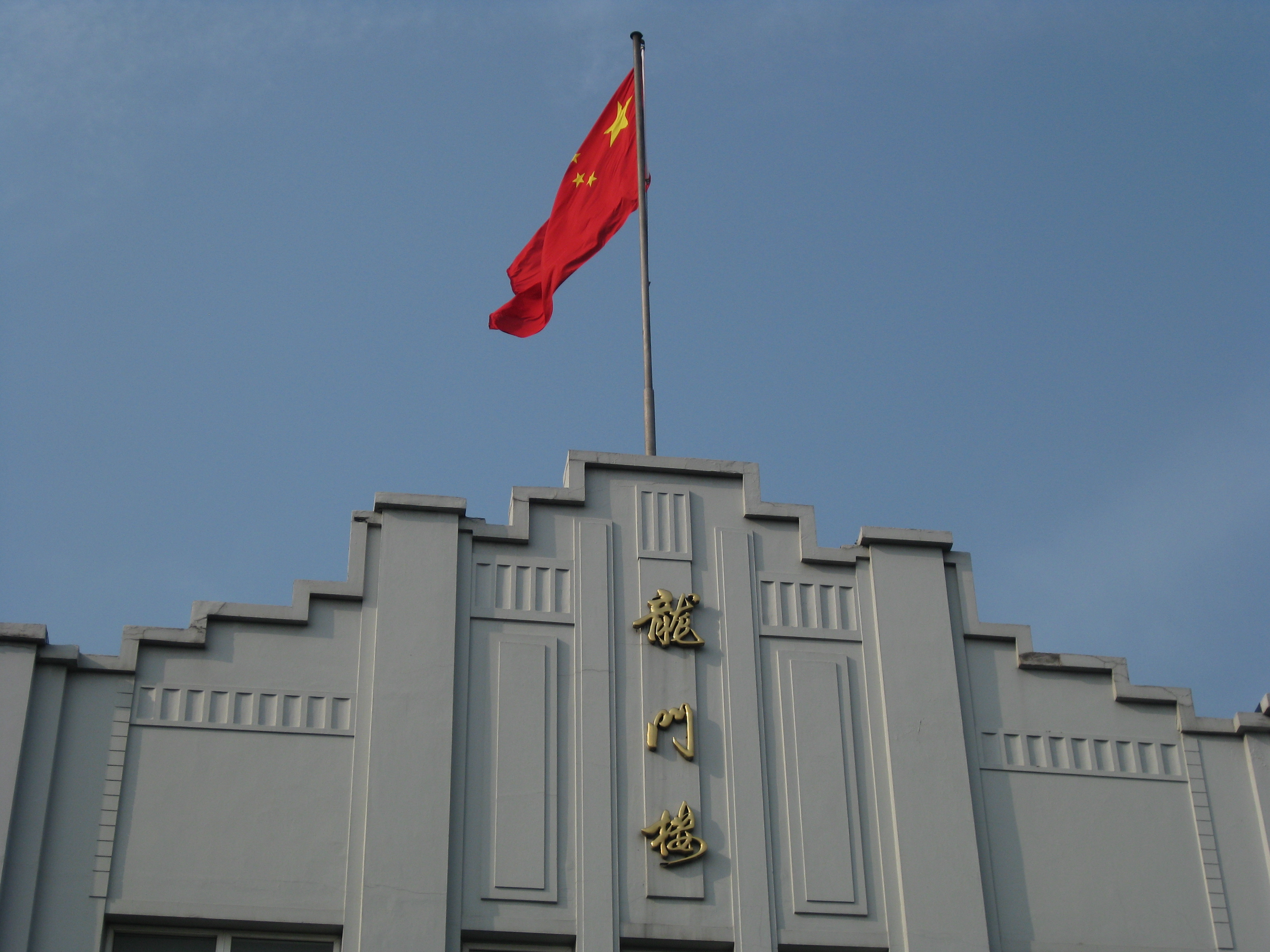
Main building of SHS division

== Campus ==
The Shanghai High School campus spans an area of 223,617 square meters. The school campus has numerous buildings, two lakes (Zhongxing and Nianci Lakes), several small meadows, several gymnasiums, and various sports facilities.

Zhongxing Building (中兴楼), located next to the Zhongxing Lake, had been the regular class building for SHSID's high school freshman and sophomores until June 2019. A new Zhentao Building (甄陶楼) was erected in 2019 as the main class building for students in grades 8-10, consisting of four floors and a basement. As of January 2025, it houses grades 9-11.

Xianmian Building (先棉堂), located near the Laboratories and Shangzhong Road gate, is the building where grades 11-12 regularly have class.

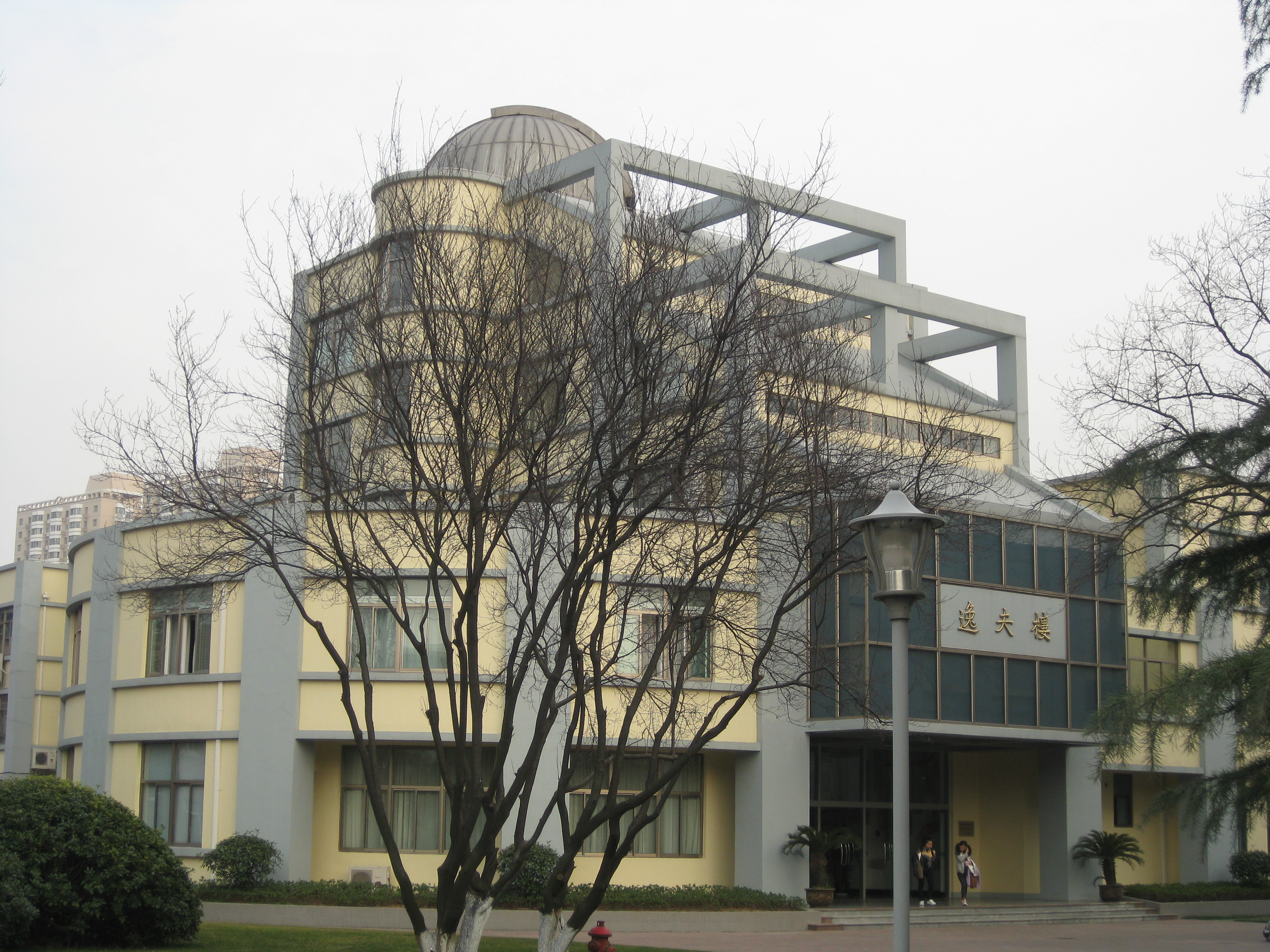
An oblique view of the Yifu building.

Yifu Building (逸夫楼) contains four stories of laboratories and an astronomical observatory on its roof. These laboratories allow for experiments to be conducted for chemistry, physics, and biology, which are roughly allocated to the first, second, and third floors, respectively. A modern analytical chemistry section was also opened recently for conducting advanced experiments, including mass spectrometry, IR and UV spectroscopy, gas chromatography, and atomic absorption spectroscopy. There are also classrooms dedicated to robotics, electrical engineering, and simulated driving.

Grade 4-8 lessons are taken in the Hsi Building (西楼). Building A is for Grades 4-5, while B, C, and D are for 8th, 7th, and 6th grades respectively. The second, third, and fourth floors have teachers offices and classrooms. The fifth and sixth levels, along with building E which was erected earlier, have laboratories for biology and other classes. The cafeteria is located on the B1 floor, and there are also some laboratories there. A, B, C, D, and E buildings are all connected on each floor.

Grade 1-3 lessons are taken in the Primary Section of the school, besides the Hsi Building. The first floor is for Grades 1-2, the second floor is for Grade 3, and the third floor is where the Primary Section's auditorium and section director's office sits.

The Nexus is a student-run charity organization. Dragon TV filmed an hour-long documentary about their charitable efforts in May 2012, which aired on June 21.

=== IAA ===
The International Affairs Association is the Model United Nations club and team of SHSID. Established in 2008, it is one of the longest-running humanities clubs of the school. In the 2023 school year, the cohort has gained over 80 members, and participated in 7 national and international conferences. It received over 61 individual awards, with 22 Best Delegate Awards.

The club annually hosts IAAMUN, an internal conference open to its high school members, as well as Oxford GlobalMUN-SHSID, an international conference coordinated by WELAND International, a company based in Beijing. It also regularly sends a delegation to Harvard Model United Nations China.

== Notable people ==
Writer Richard Gordon was a teacher at SHSID from fall 2005 until his death in February 2009.

== Photo gallery ==
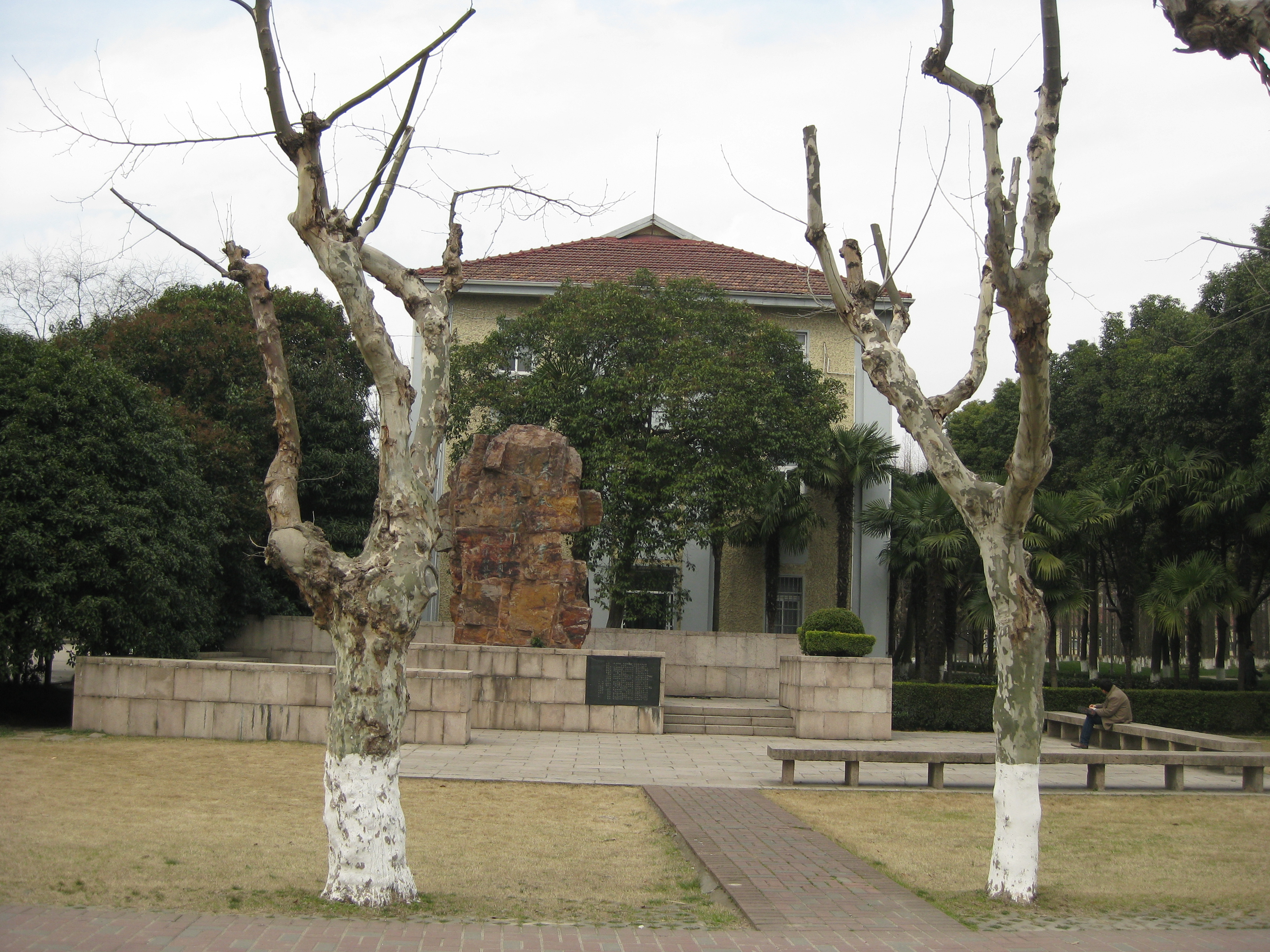
A bust and grass replaced this rock monument at SHSID

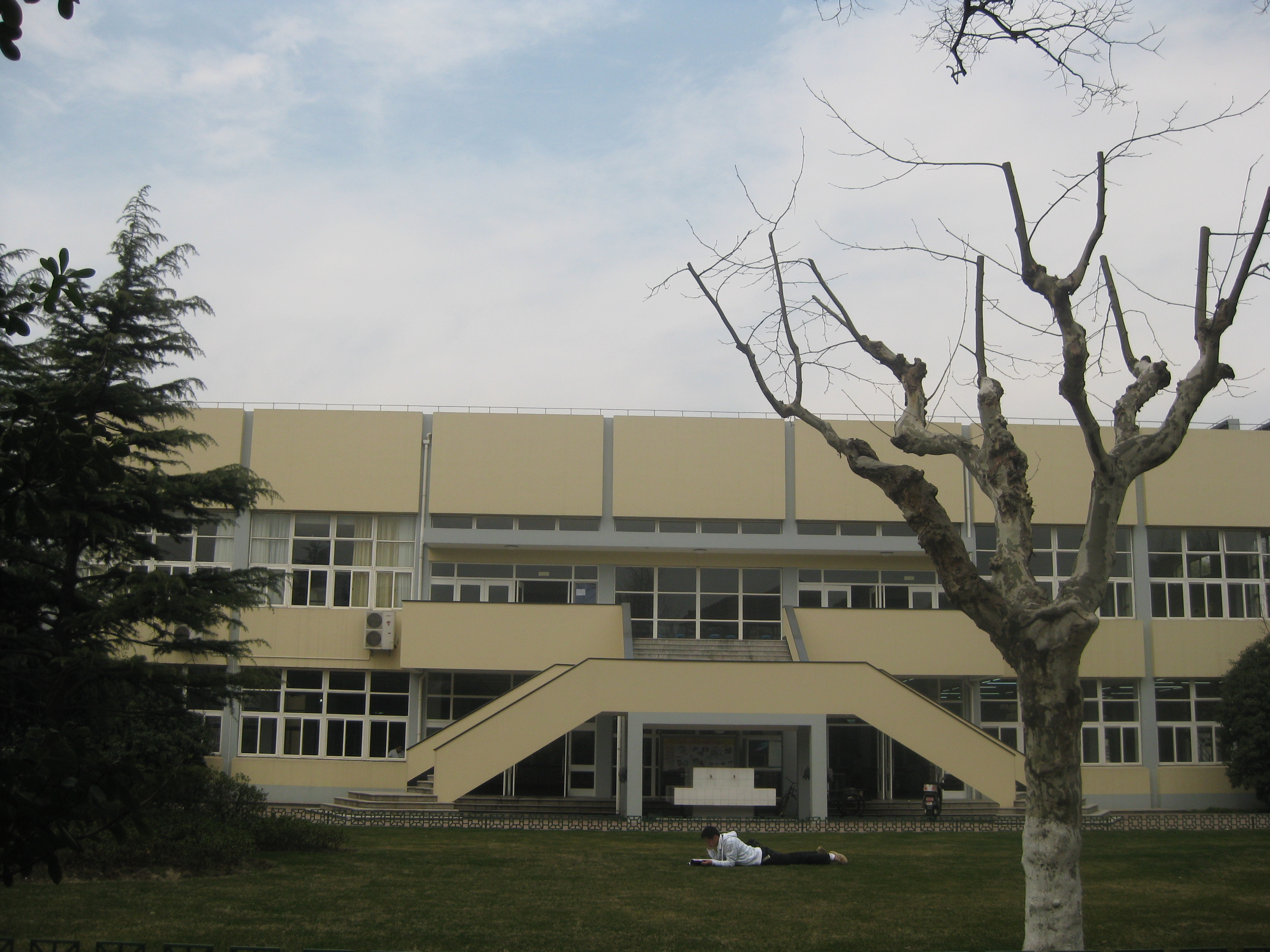
SHS cafeteria

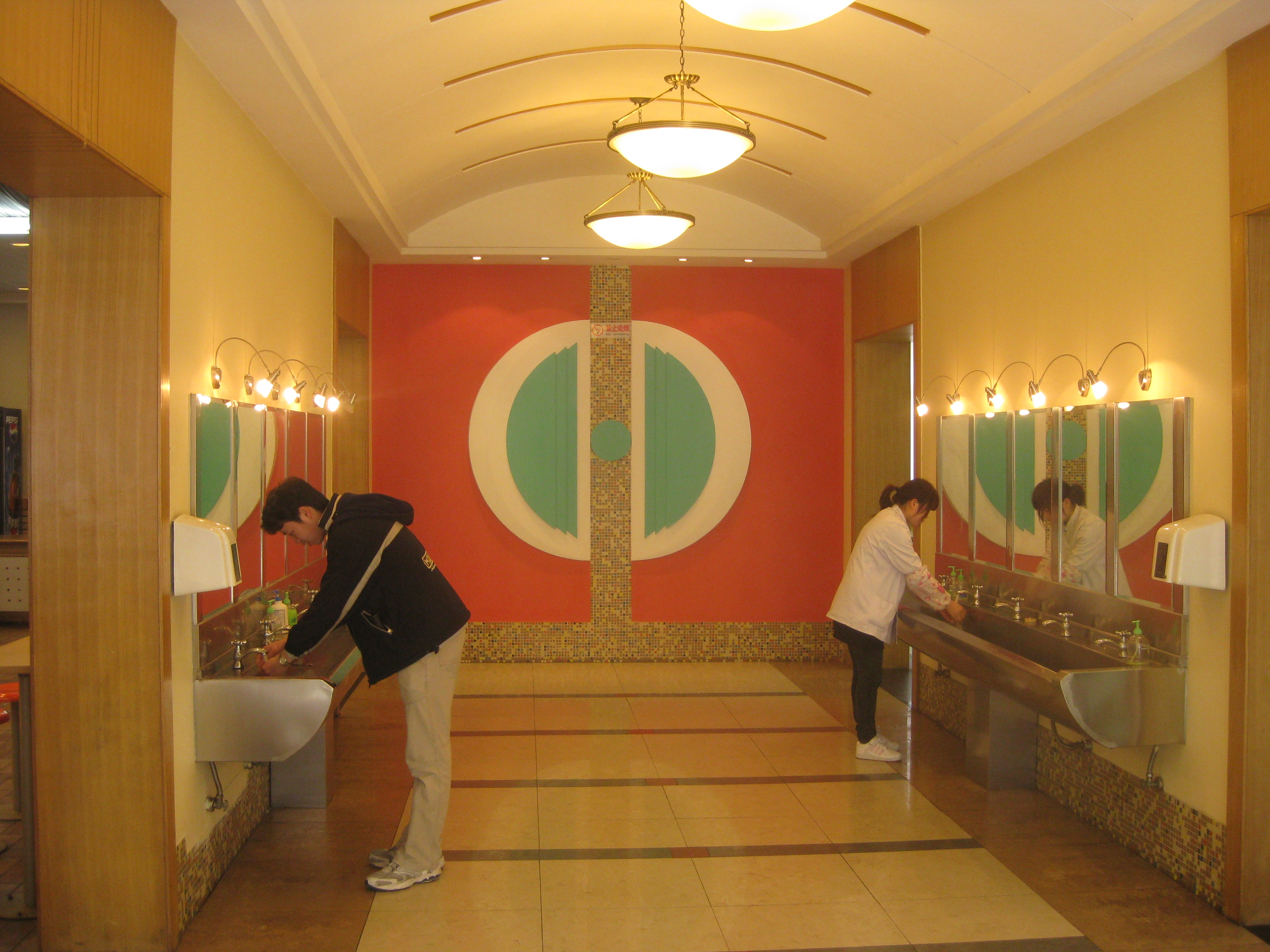
New international cafeteria

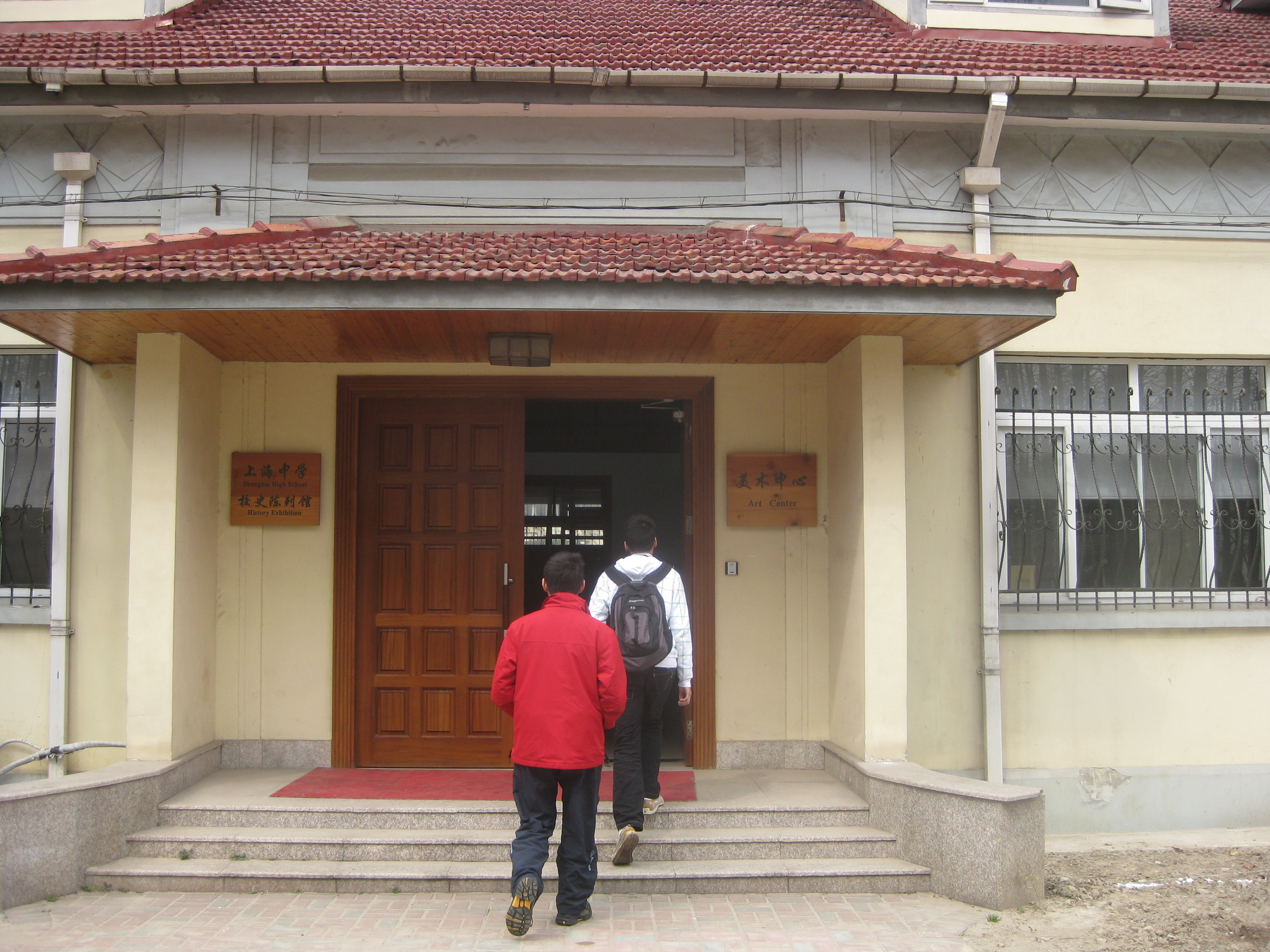
Art center

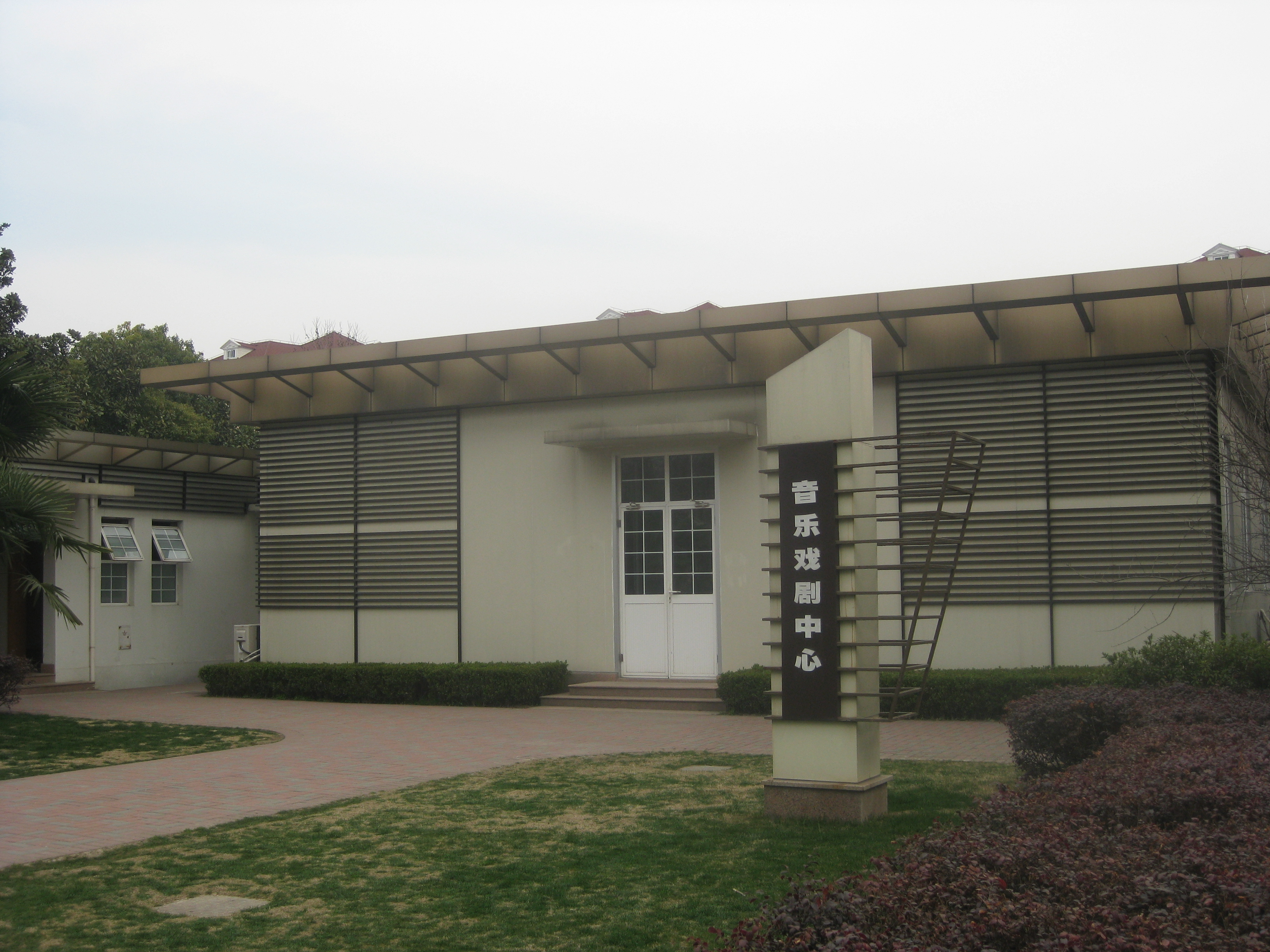
Music center

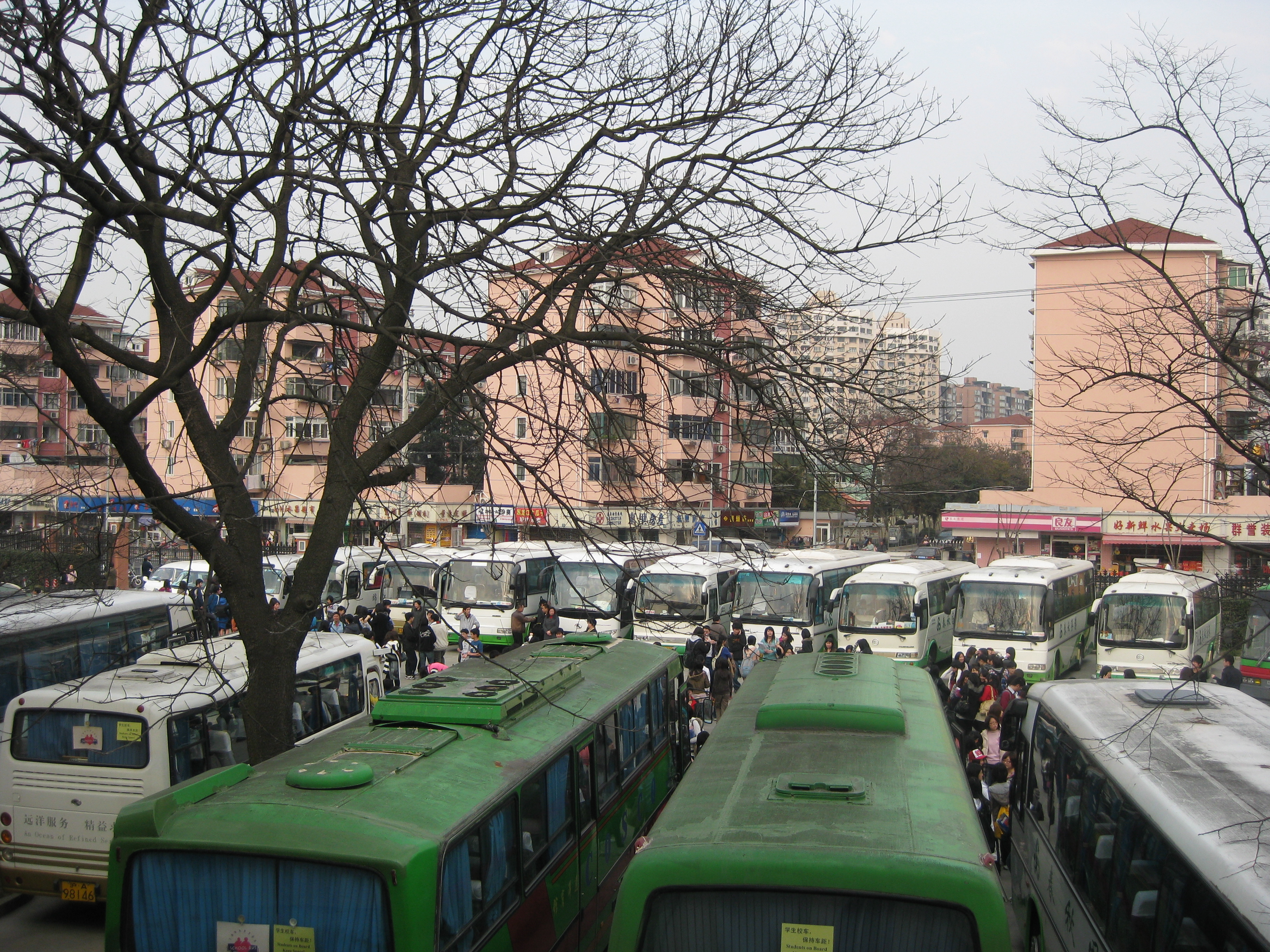
SHSID bus parking lot

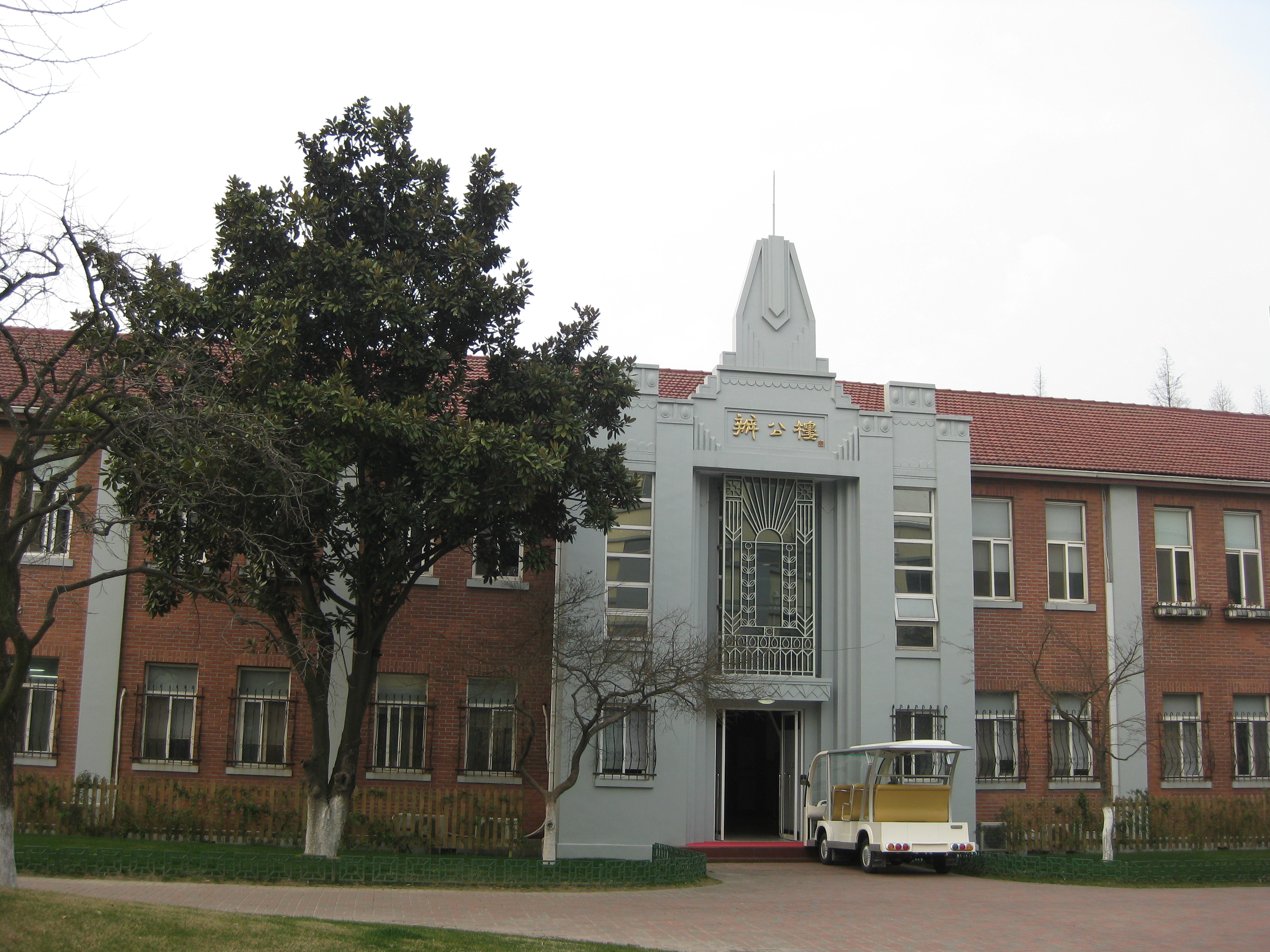
Principal's building

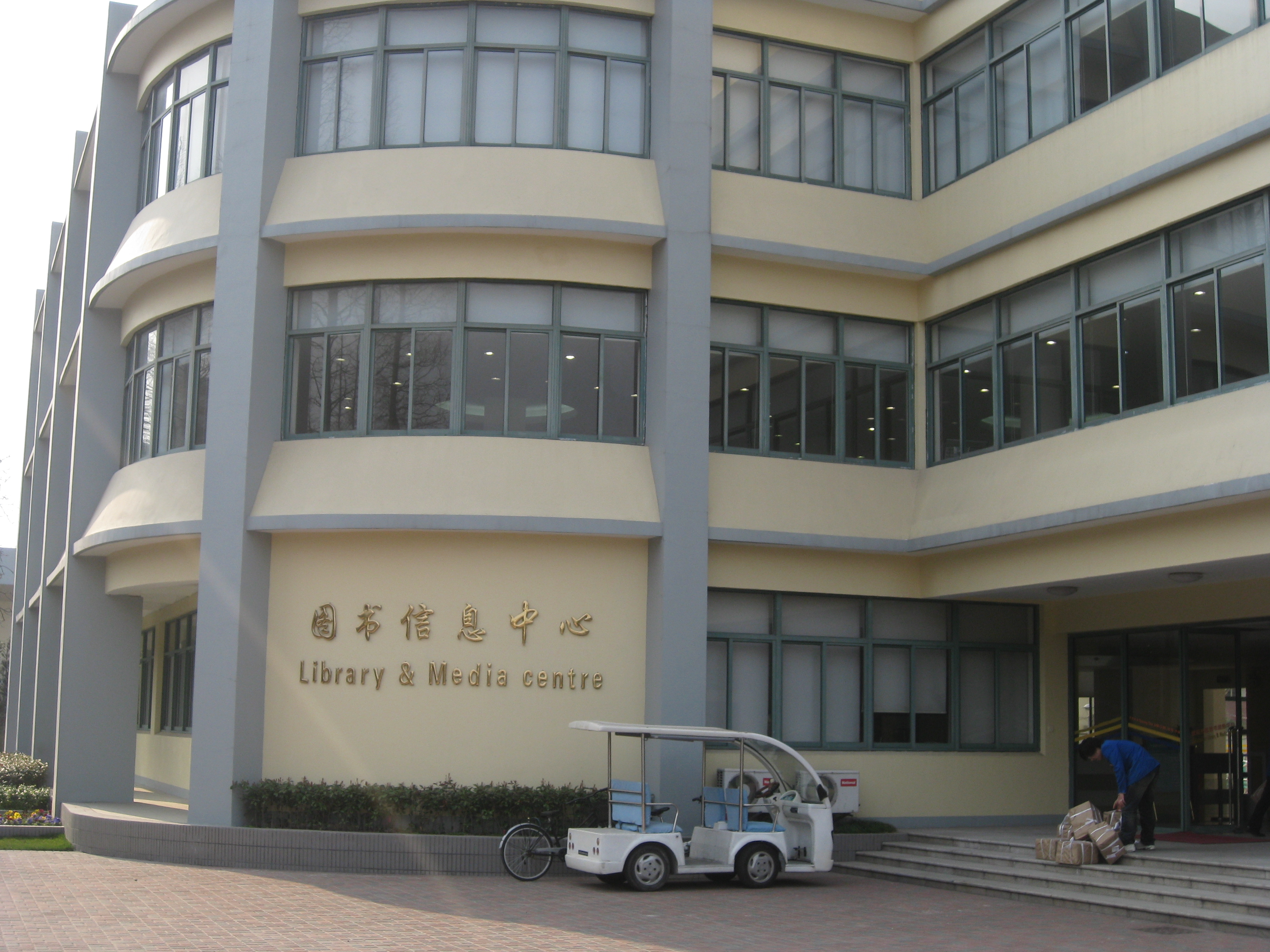
Library and media center

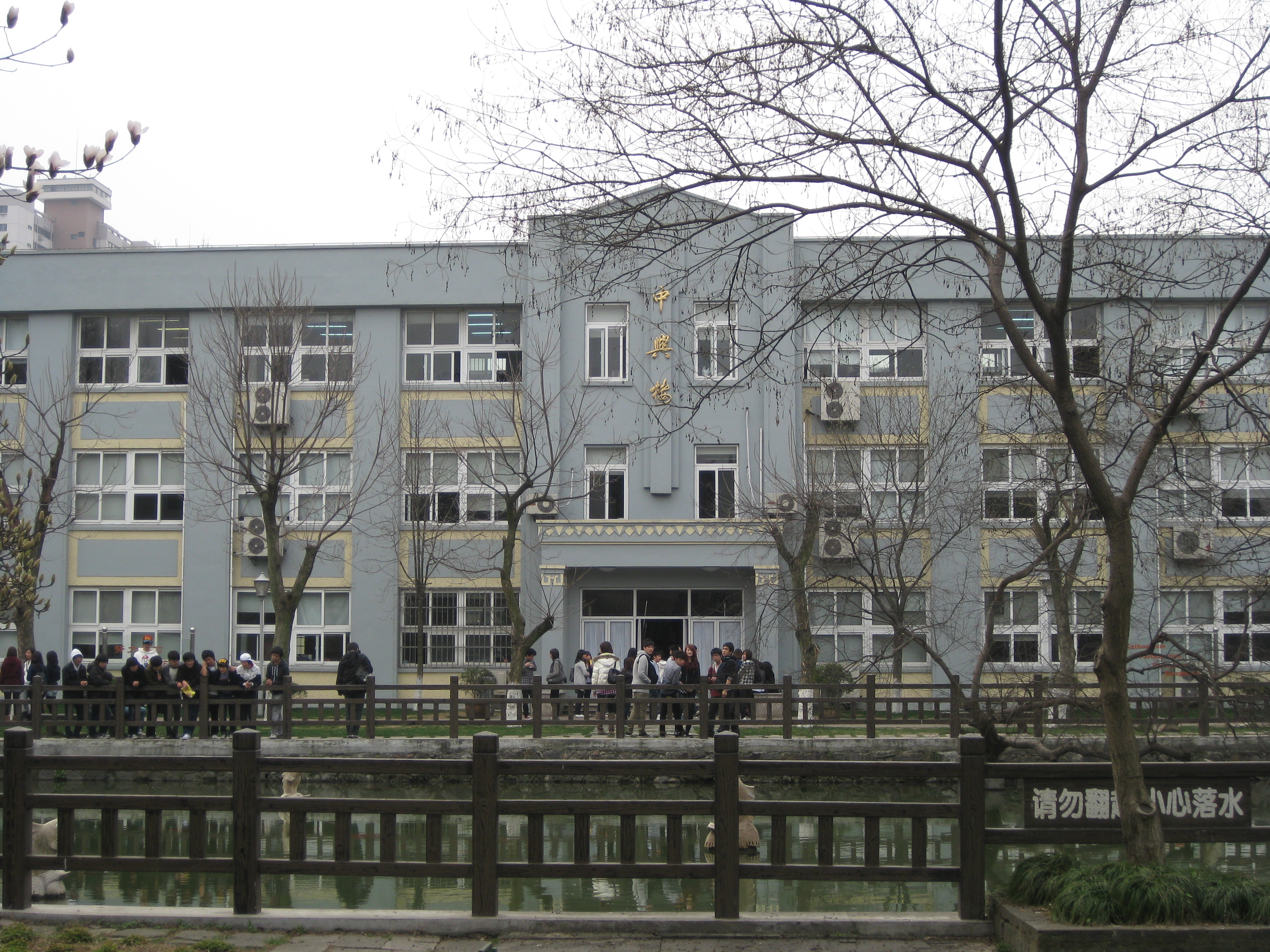
Zhongxing Building for underclassmen

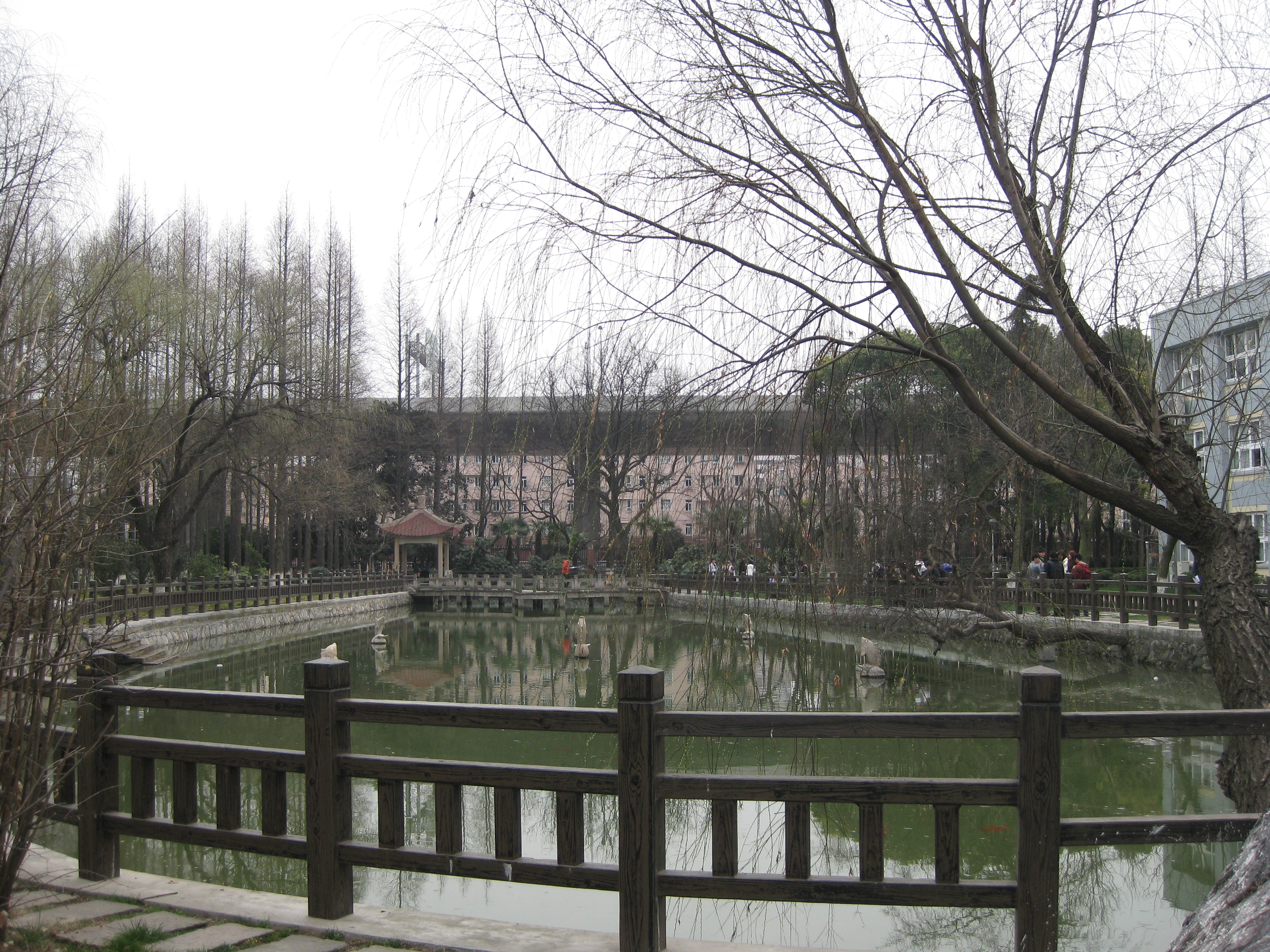
Zhongxing Lake

== See also ==
- List of international schools in Shanghai
- List of international schools
