= Quaternary Geochronology =

- Discipline: Geochronology of the Quaternary period
- Language: English
- Edited by: Frank Preusser

Publication details
- History: 2006-present
- Publisher: Elsevier (The Netherlands)
- Frequency: Bimonthly
- Open access: Hybrid
- Impact factor: 1.7 (2023)

Standard abbreviations
- ISO 4: Quat. Geochronol.

Indexing
- ISSN: 1871-1014 (print); 1878-0350 (web)
- OCLC no.: 75956884

Links
- Journal homepage; Online access

Quaternary Geochronology is a peer-reviewed scientific journal addressing methods and results in the dating of samples from the Quaternary Period.

The journal's scope covers the principles of geochronological methods, their analytical procedures, and instrumentation, such as Luminescence dating, Tephrochronology, or Surface exposure dating. To that end, the journal is a platform for new and groundbreaking applications targeting the timing of events and processes in the Quaternary Period.

The journal was launched by Rainer Grün in 2006 as a stand-alone journal to cover discovery in the field Quaternary Geochronology as research discipline. Before, articles from that field were published as a subsection in the journal Quaternary Science Reviews.
