= Former Residence of Ding Richang =

- 丁日昌旧居
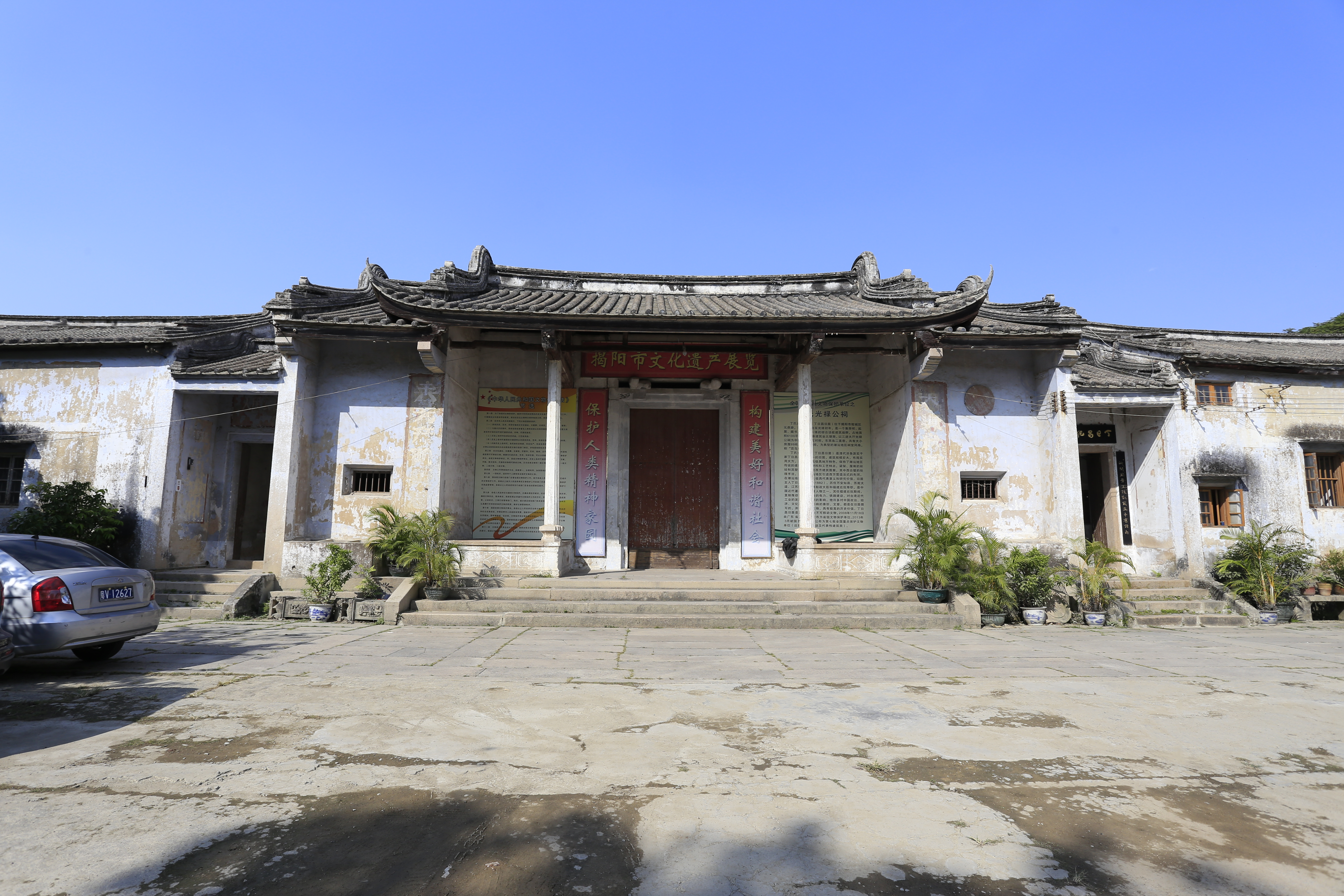
- Frontal view of the Former Residence of Ding Richang.

- Location within Guangdong

General information
- Type: Traditional folk houses
- Location: Rongcheng District, Jieyang, Guangdong, China
- Coordinates: 23°32′26.22″N 116°20′49.68″E
- Groundbreaking: 1878
- Completed: 1878
- Owner: Jieyang Municipal Government

Height
- Architectural: Chinese architecture

Technical details
- Material: Bricks and wood
- Grounds: 6,100 m^{2} (66,000 sq ft)

The Former Residence of Ding Richang (simplified Chinese: 丁日昌旧居; traditional Chinese: 丁日昌舊居; pinyin: Dīng Rìchāng Jiùjū) was built in 1878, during the late Qing dynasty (1644–1911). It was the mansion of Ding Richang, a senior official in the Qing court.

== History ==
The former residence was built in memory of Ding Xianba (丁贤拔), the father of Ding Richang, in 1878 after his retirement. Ding died there on 27 February 1882.

=== Ding Richang ===
Ding Richang was a major Qing‑dynasty statesman and thinker, recognized as one of the early pioneers of late Qing's Self‑Strengthening Movement. This site is where he composed many of his memorials and writings advocating reforms in politics, the economy, and culture.

=== Architecture ===
The complex has an area of about 6,100 square metres (66,000 sq ft). It is arranged in the shape of the Traditional Chinese character Xing (興). It is carefully organized and impressively large, consisting of 99 rooms and halls. The craftsmanship is refined, featuring woodcarvings with strong local character. Western decorative patterns appear in the painted beams, ridge ornaments, and plaster reliefs, making this one of the first buildings in the Chaoshan region to incorporate Western architectural elements. The site functioned both as a place of ancestral worship and as a multi‑purpose residence combining living space, a library, and educational facilities. Today it serves as the Ding Richang Memorial Hall, designated as a national third‑class museum and a key base for patriotic and traditional culture education in Jieyang.

It was designated as a municipal level cultural heritage in 1993 and then a provincial level cultural preservation unit in 2008.

In March 2013, it was listed among the seventh group of "Major National Historical and Cultural Sites in Guangdong" by the State Council of China.

== Gallery ==
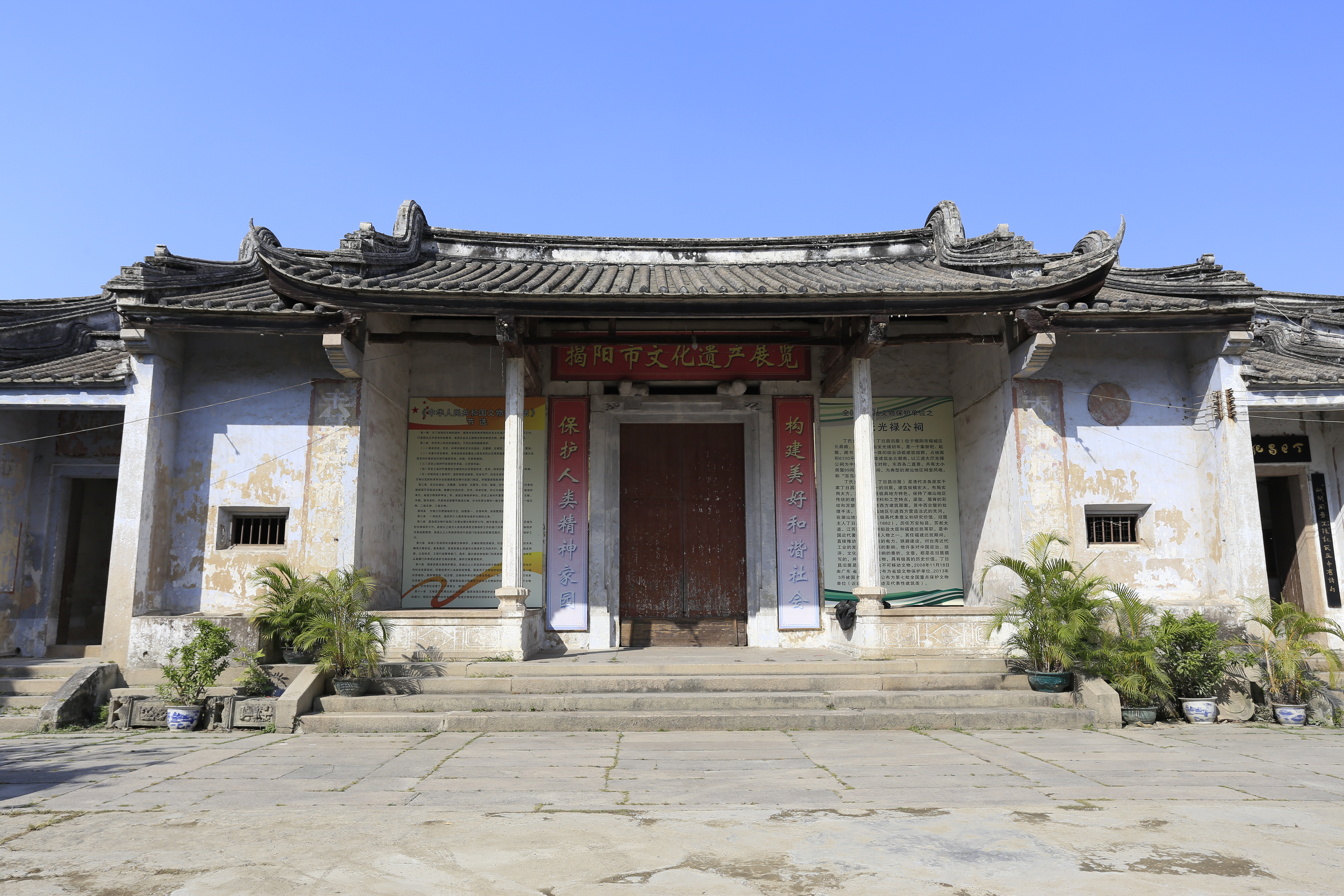
Frontal view of the Former Residence of Ding Richang.

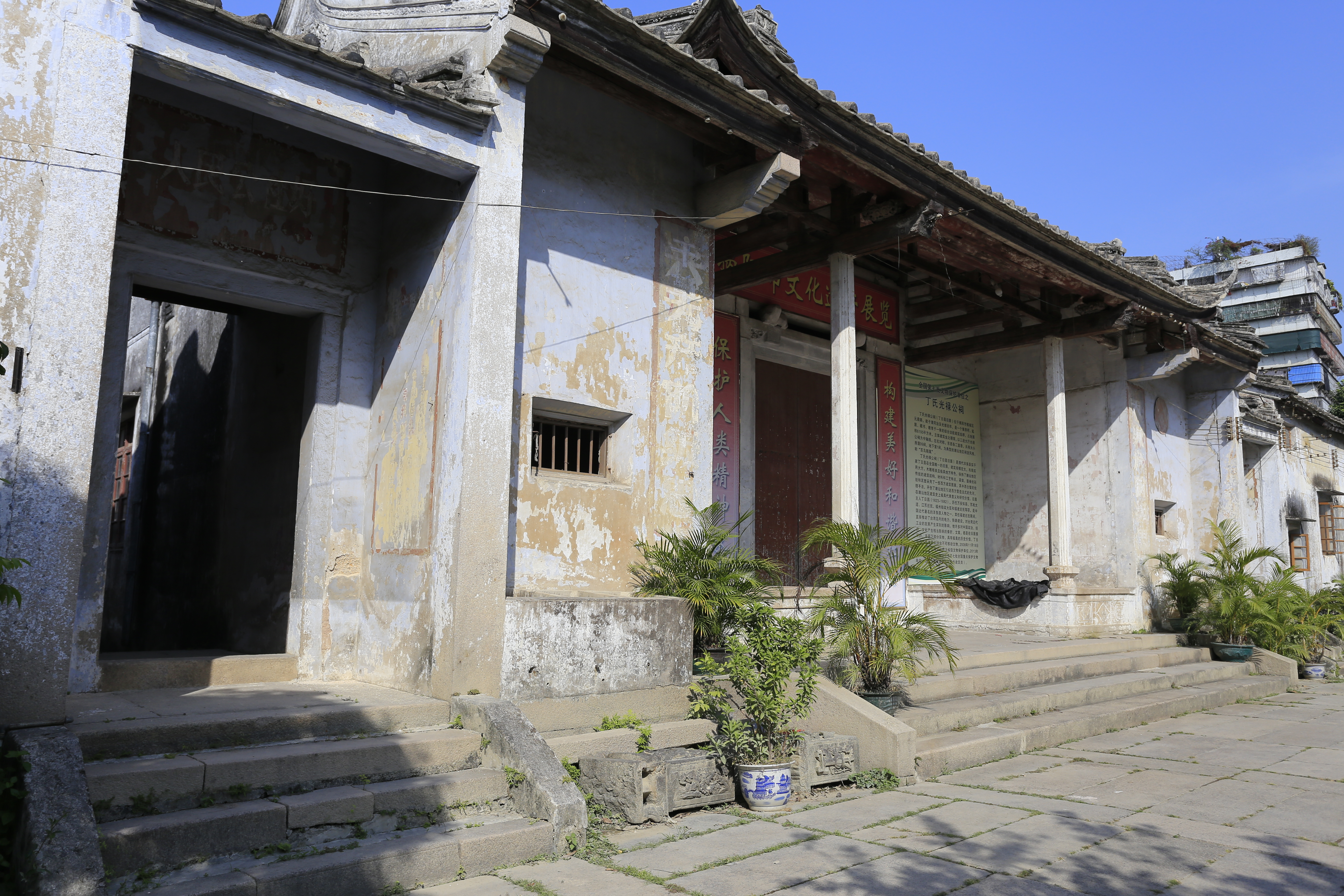
A side view of the Former Residence of Ding Richang.

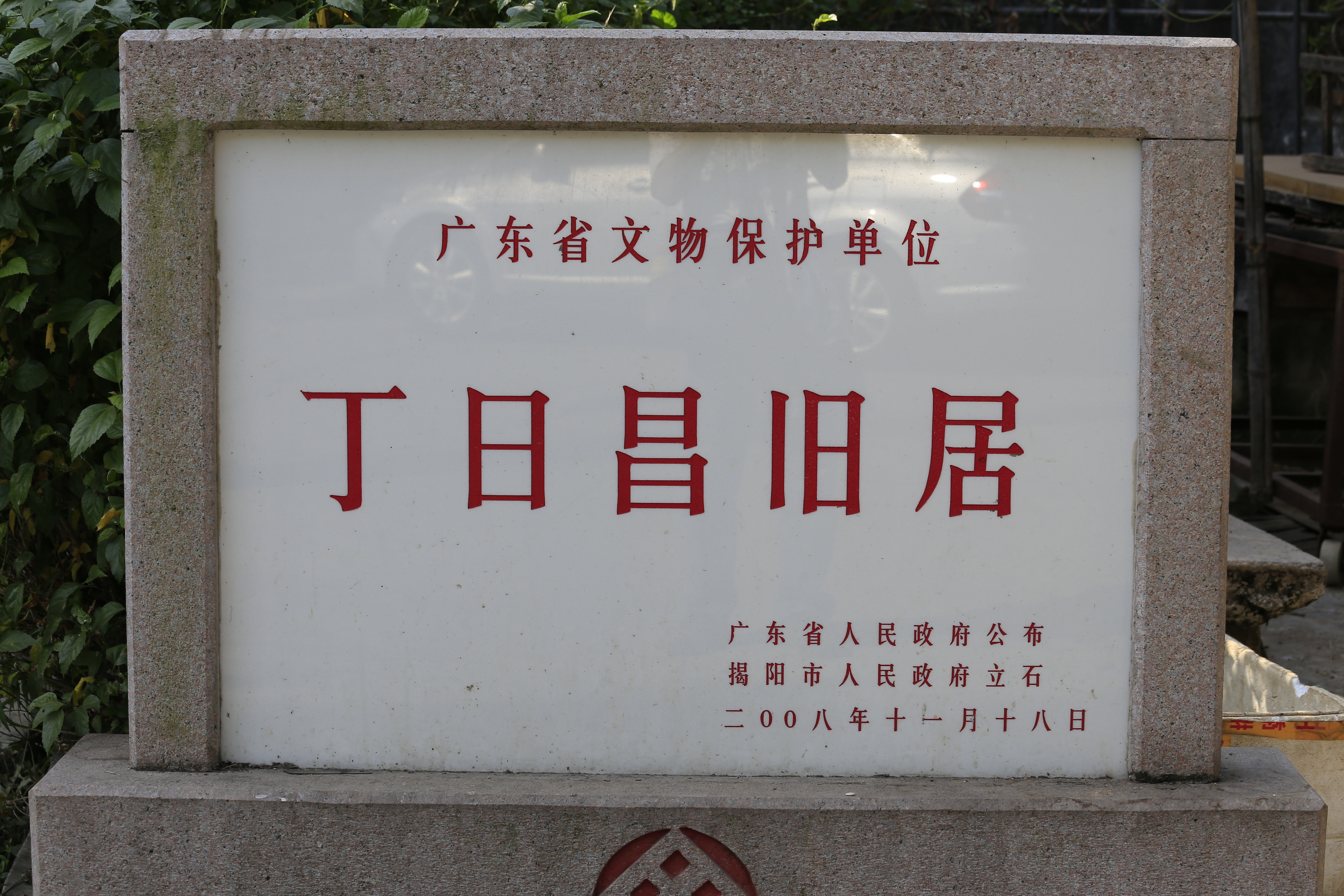
Sign of the Former Residence of Ding Richang.
