= Ching-Lai Sheng =

Sheng Ching-lai
- 盛慶琜 /盛庆琜
- Born: 20 July 1919; Kahsing
- Died: 23 June 2018 (aged 98)
- Education: University of Edinburgh Ph.D. in Electrical engineering
- Known for: Dean, College of Engineering, NCTU

Dr Sheng Ching-lai or Sheng Qinglai (July 20, 1919 – June 23, 2018) was a Chinese-born Taiwanese electrical engineer, computer scientist, and philosopher. He served at the president of the National Chiao Tung University from 1972 to 1978.

== Career ==
In 1941, Sheng graduated from the National Chiao Tung University in Shanghai with a B.Sc. degree in mechanical engineering. From 1941 to 1945, he worked as a civil servant in the province of Sichuan, where the wartime capital Chongqing was situated.

After the war he studied at the University of Edinburgh. He earned a doctorate from the university in 1948. Through high career he taught at the National Taiwan University, the University of Ottawa, the University of Windsor, and the Tamkang University. He also served as the dean of the National Chiao Tung University College of Engineering. He also served as the president of the university from 1972 to 1978, where he planned the expansion of the campus.

Sheng wrote extensively on utilitarianism, and developed a "unified utilitarian theory", described as "a decision-theoretical model of value that approximates the moral mathematics of Jeremy Bentham."

Sheng died on June 23, 2018.
