= Qiong Prefecture (Hainan) =

Historical administrative division in Hainan, China

Qiong Prefecture (瓊州) Qiongshan Commandery (瓊山郡)
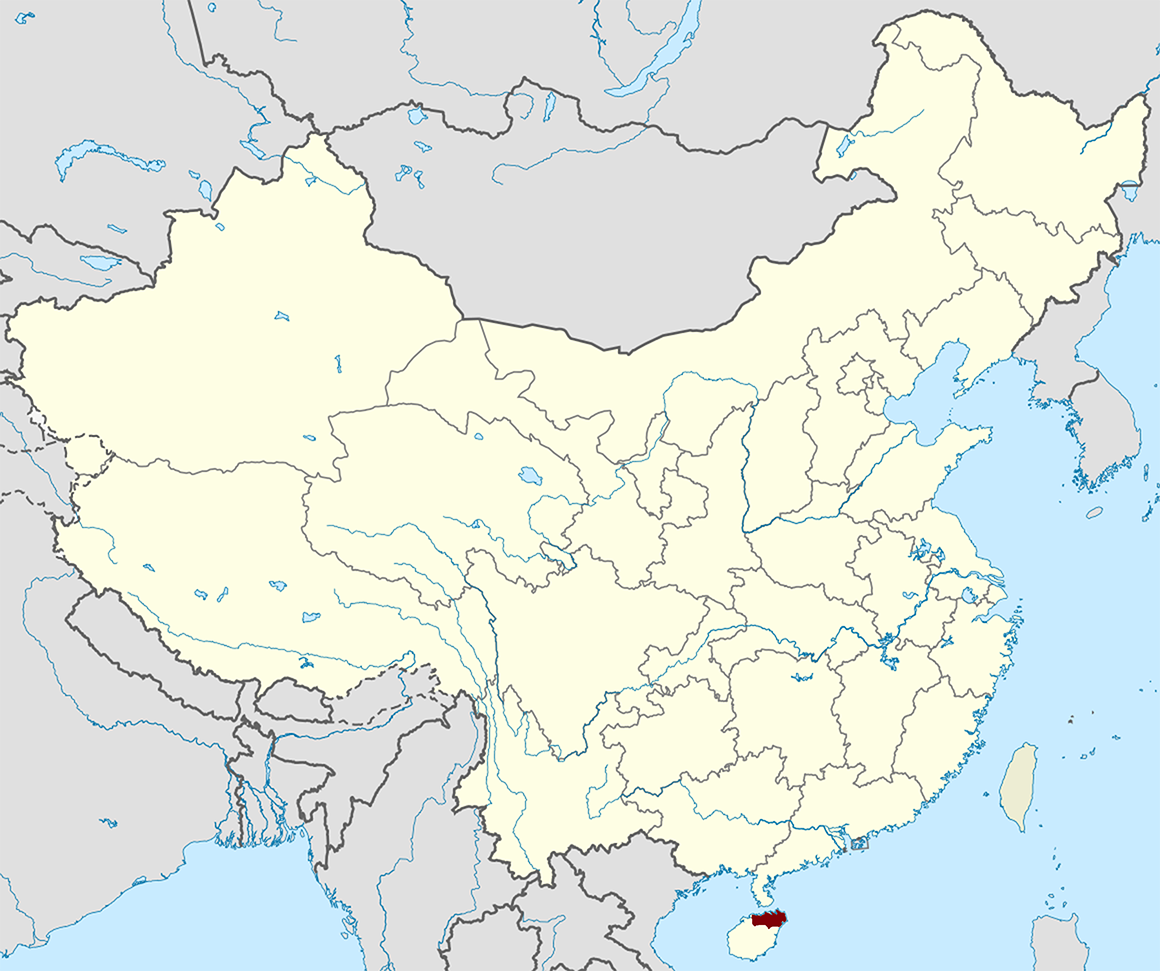
- Population
  - 740s or 750s: Unknown, 649 households
  - 1070s or 1080s: Unknown, 8,963 households
- History
  - Created: 631 (Tang dynasty)
  - Abolished: 1329 (Yuan dynasty)
  - Succeeded by: Qianning Tribal Pacification Commission (乾寧軍民安撫司)
- Contained within
  - Circuit: Tang dynasty: Lingnan Circuit; Song dynasty: Guangnan Circuit; Guangnan West Circuit

Qiong Prefecture
- Traditional Chinese: 瓊州
- Simplified Chinese: 琼州
Transcriptions
Standard Mandarin
- Hanyu Pinyin: Qióng Zhōu

Qiongshan Commandery
- Traditional Chinese: 瓊山郡
- Simplified Chinese: 琼山郡
Transcriptions
Standard Mandarin
- Hanyu Pinyin: Qióngshān Jùn

Qiongzhou or Qiong Prefecture was a zhou (prefecture) in imperial China in modern northeastern Hainan, China. It existed from 631 to 1329, but between 742 and 758 it was known as Qiongshan Commandery (also translated as Qiongshan Prefecture).

== Counties ==
In the Tang dynasty, Qiong Prefecture administered the following counties (縣):

- Qiongshan (瓊山), roughly modern Haikou
- Lingao (臨高), roughly modern Lingao County
- Lehui (樂會), roughly modern Qionghai
- Zengkou (曾口), roughly modern Chengmai County
- Yanluo (顏羅), roughly modern southern Haikou or Ding'an County

Yanluo was abolished late in the Tang dynasty, while Zengkou was abolished by Southern Han. In the Song dynasty, Qiong Prefecture again administered 5 counties, including:

- Qiongshan
- Lingao
- Lehui
- Chengmai (澄邁), roughly modern Chengmai County
- Wenchang (文昌), roughly modern Wenchang
