= Ding Richang =

Chinese government official

- 丁日昌
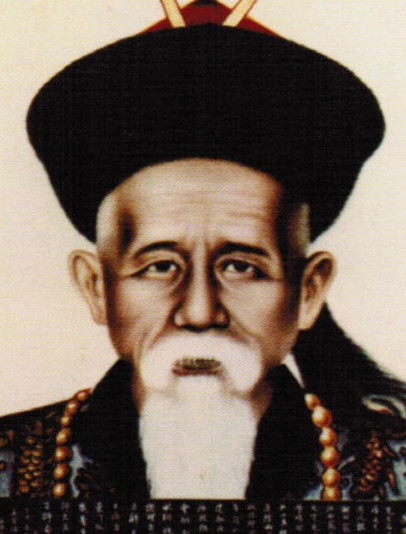

Personal details
- Born: July 8 1823 Fengshun, Chaozhou, Qing Dynasty (now Fengshun, Meizhou)
- Died: 27 February 1882 Qing Dynasty

Military service
- Allegiance: Qing Dynasty

Chinese name
- Chinese: 丁日昌
Transcriptions
Standard Mandarin
- Hanyu Pinyin: Dīng Rìchāng
- Wade–Giles: Ting^{1} Jih^{4}-ch'ang^{1}
Wu
- Wugniu: Tin^{1} Zeq^{8}-tshaon^{1}
- Suzhounese: Tin^{1} Zeq^{8}-tshan^{1}
Hakka
- Pha̍k-fa-sṳ: Tên Ngit-chhông
Yue: Cantonese
- Jyutping: Ding^{1} Jat^{6}-coeng^{1}
Southern Min
- Hokkien POJ: Teng Ji̍t-chhiong
- Teochew Peng'im: Dêng^{1} Rig^{8}-ciang^{1}
Eastern Min
- Fuzhou BUC: Dĭng Nĭk-chiŏng
Pu-Xian Min
- Hinghwa BUC: Deng Di̍h-chio̤ng
Northern Min
- Jian'ou Romanized: Dáing Nì-chióng

Courtesy name
- Chinese: 禹生
Transcriptions
Standard Mandarin
- Hanyu Pinyin: Yǔ Shēng
- Wade–Giles: Yü^{3} Sheng^{1}
Wu
- Wugniu: Yoq^{8} Sen^{1}
- Suzhounese: Yu^{6} Sen^{1}
Hakka
- Pha̍k-fa-sṳ: Yí Sên
Yue: Cantonese
- Jyutping: Jyu^{5} Sang^{1}
Southern Min
- Hokkien POJ: Ú Seng
- Teochew Peng'im: U^{2} Sêng^{1}
Eastern Min
- Fuzhou BUC: Ṳ̄ Sĕng
Pu-Xian Min
- Hinghwa BUC: Ṳ̂ Seng

Ding Richang (Chinese: 丁日昌; Wade–Giles: Ting Jih-Ch'ang; 1823–1882) was a Chinese official and founder of the Kiangnan Arsenal, remembered for his "indomitable" if not "prodigious" reform efforts, skill in foreign diplomacy (or "foreign-matters expert"), and supervision of the judicial administration, engaging in anti-tax abuse directed at the Yamen. In his late years, he presided over Taiwan during one of the "most dynamic periods" of its history. The program he laid there is relatable to that of the Self-Strengthening Movement.

Magistrate of Jiangxi, during the Taiping Rebellion Ding lost and regained rank to become Shanghai intendant, returning to the devastated Jiangxi as Finance Commissioner in 1867 and Province Governor from 1868 to 1870. Ding's lengthy 1868 memorial admits to the hopelessness of effective governance without qualified administrators and structural reform. In spite of constant vigilance, corruption by the yamen continued throughout his term, remaining a central issue.

Li Hongzhang relied on Ding for advice on Western military technology. Both defended slow shipbuilding modernization efforts from criticism, with China taking greater interest in ordnance. As Shanghai intendant Ding founded the Kiangnan Arsenal, to which was attached a language school and translation department. Its 200 works had a powerful influence in the modernization of China. Ding also founded the Lung-mên shu-yuan Academy in Shanghai, which would be reorganized as a normal school in 1904.

Despite his reformist propositions and support of Western learning, Ding was strongly committed to Confucianism and opposed the spread of Western religion. However, unlike his contemporary censors he was open to the flourishing Buddhist religion.

== Early life ==
Ding was born in Fengshun County. His father was a pharmacist, philanthropic but not rich. Nonetheless, Ding was able to attend school in his childhood at a local temple. Known for his talents in writing, Fengshun's magistrate accepted Ding as protégé, and an unidentified sponsor paid the expense of the provincial Canton examination. Becoming a licentiate, Ding obtained the rank of student at the Imperial academy at 20, possibly paid for by the same. Ding earned a stipend for distinction in the annual prefecture examination. Known for his analysis of politics and affairs, Ding was published in the Feng-Shun gazetteer, and Li Chang-yu, the hui'ch'ao-chia Taotai, invited Ding to his staff as secretary. But Ding was never able to master the more abstruse provincial examination.

After failing the 1845 examination Ding built a small two-room school, teaching for three years. He then became a secretary to local officials for two years, purchasing the rank of an expectant director of schools, but was again unsuccessful in the 1850 examination. In 1854 he was awarded with the rank of an expectant magistrate for help in subduing local Cantonese bandits, and in 1856 was appointed subdirector of schools for Qiongzhou (Hainan Island). He was appointed magistrate of Jiangxi three years later, at the age of thirty-five.

== Jiangxi and Ji'an magistrate ==
As magistrate Ding controlled corruption in Jiangxi through strict supervision of his subordinates. His swift policies were praised by the Jiangxi Wan-an gazetteer, and it is said that he reduced the number of backlogged cases from over a hundred to only a few within a month. He also began reconstruction of the academy and city temple, which had been destroyed by Taiping rebels. After his departure the people of Wan-an are said to have petitioned for his return.

Departing his Jiangxi magistracy in 1859 for a foreign affairs appointment in Guandong, Ding was soon made acting magistrate of Ji'an with the goal of recapturing the county seat. He succeeded, but lost it to retreating Taiping rebels in 1861, losing his rank and office, though he and his superiors recovered Ji'an. However, Ding's expertise in foreign affairs bought him favour, and he would go on to supervise firearms manufacturing in Guangdong. His services in both instances would see his rank restored to him in 1862. Considering him essential, the governor-general was twice successful in petitioning the court to prevent his leaving for summons to perform the same in Jiangxi.

== Shanghai Intendant and Jiangsu finance commissioner ==
Following his service on Li Hongzhang's secretariat, Li recommended Ding for prefect, which he was awarded, stressing Ding's role during the campaign that recovered Jiangsu. For his diplomatic handling of staff negotiations in this role, Ding was awarded Shanghai taotai (intendant of Suzhou, Songjiang and Taicang), which entailed constant foreign dealings. Going over regular channels, Ding succeeded in acquiring the appointment of a former British officer (William Winstanley) from the Ever Victorious Army for his new unit, much to the chagrin of the British authorities in Shanghai.

As Shanghai taotai, on the basis of treaties he believed the Chinese should honour, he rejected the petitions of Chinese merchants to ban foreign cotton-goods shops, and with difficulty persuaded the inhabitants of Chaozhou to accept foreign entry. On the same basis he rejected American real-estate interests in Shanghai and British steamship traffic. In 1863 he promised to reduce taxes on Chinese junks so as to make them competitive with foreign ships (apparently in bean trade), and wrote to Li Hongzhang suggesting that the Chinese buy and build steamships, which, allowing them to outcompete the foreigners, would remove the need to expel them by force.

His proposal was accepted, but in 1864 memorialized China as being surrounded by enemies, still demonstrating a clear commitment to ordnance. In 1865, in response to a need by Li Hongzhang and the Yamen for formal training in mechanics and mathematics, he purchased (as an administrator) machinery from a foreign factory at Shanghai, founding the Kiangnan Arsenal. It incorporated Li's previous two Arsenals.

Li was promoted to salt controller in September 1865 before being named the Jiangsu finance commissioner, or treasurer, in early 1866, which he performed in 1867. During this time Li submitted his first lengthy program for sweeping reform; referring to the situation as "unprecedented since ancient times". It called for better personnel training and selection, examinations, increased reward and punishment, longer terms, and higher salaries. Ding made an argument for sending diplomats overseas, and defended the efforts of a slow approach to modern arms and shipbuilding, referencing the Analects of Confucius; "those who wish to have things done quickly will never attain their objective, and those who see only the small advantages will never accomplish great things." Ding's compatriot Li Hongzhang would similarly defend the early shipbuilding efforts in 1872.

== Jiangsu Governorship ==
Receiving Governorship in 1868, Ding took to referring to himself as a "man up from the fields" in letters to the Emperor, and sent letters of reprimand to his subordinates that had they been commoners and secretaries they would neither be so insensitive nor incompetent. However, apparently unsure of the use of his authority, his words had more sting than his actions. Though avoiding involving them in government he cultivated relationships with local scholar-elites through book-lending from his personal library. Continuing an effort he had made during the war, Ding used his position in Jiangsu to purchase books from destitute Chinese for cataloguing by a subordinate, later writing a more complete catalogue from his home - and inspiring a third by the commissioner of education, Chiang Piao.

Ding established free schools and lectures, reprinting the Expanded Sacred Edicts, subsidized fertilizer, and pressed for repair of waterworks. On the penal side of things he drew up plans in late 1868 for weapon's collection to combat piracy, which was successful, attempted to ban delayed burial, and closed some twenty nunneries reputedly used as brothels. He rebuilt temples and banned religious processions as attracting undesirables, and suppressed gambling. He halted the construction of theatres, though he was unable to exert control over the profession. Although closing urban dens, his campaign against opium was less successful. His efforts against forced remarriage, including an aid association for widows, were unsuccessful.

Ding kept tabs on northern Jiangsu (Kiangpei) through secret agents. However, apart from directives he didn't attempt to reform Kiangpei personally, likely considering the impoverished and unruly region beyond his capacity. Though southern Jiangsu and Jiangxi was recovering from the war, it also had an element in the imperial court and an economic diversity that attracted patrons in wealth, commerce and the arts.

=== Tax Reform ===
Ding's chief effort in Suzhou was to improve the tax-collection process. His efforts hinged on control over clerks and runners, who he focused on bringing under the supervision of magistrates, improving the latter's selection and establishing channels of communication between them and the peasants. To a large extent these measures consisted in enforcing already present regulations that in the past had only been enforced on their being broken. He made a warning and executed those runners involving in banditry.

In contrast with his predecessor Feng Guifen, who considered taxes too high even after reduction, Ding considered irregularity the primary problem with the tax administration (while still needing to not overburden the peasants). To accomplish this, using earlier plans earlier proposed by Feng, he simultaneously lightened taxes while establishing norms in the handling of taxes in collection and accounting, uniform conversion rates, and enforcement, using his powers as governor while trying to persuade the central government.

While he probably would have preferred the complete restructuring proposed by Feng, he settled for a few of his more important ideas. His 1868 memorial to the throne proposed limiting clerk positions to non-degree holding scholars (rather than any semi-literate) on the basis that they might value their reputation more. Though not holding a degree they would still have to pass a series of examinations, and would be re-examined every year. To make the position attractive, in addition to comfortable emoluments they could eventually become regular bureaucrats this way. His proposal was not accepted, probably on account of more pressing expenses and entrenched interests.

In-order to prevent over-collection, he developed to a high degree the publication of all tax information that peasants would need to know. Following this he made efforts to continually supervise and penalize the magistrates themselves. To counterbalance the magistrates (that is, the yamen) he made it so the headmen had to be selected from among village elders, given a travel allowance for reporting, and hopefully being less inclined to extortion made them responsible for local tax-collection. He enforced (and in some cases instituted) responsibility on the magistrates for tax-receipts, and simplified procedures. He tried to curb litigation, which was expensive.

Although already considered archaic at that time, the revival of the Baojia or mutual responsibility system during the Taiping rebellion may be associated with the Self-Strengthening Movement. Ding ordered its enforcement in Jiangsu. In the Baojia system, registers are drawn up of males sixteen to sixty, under which households are divided up by units of tens and hundreds and bound by mutual responsibility, with elected heads that had some level of local influence. Landlords were predominant as elected heads, and including for surveillance over the landlords themselves, were together potentially useful for tax collection and other levies.

== Fujian Governorship ==
Ding was appointed to Taiwan in 1869, and with Imperial sanction reduced the aborigines there. Ding desired to seriously reform Taiwan as a new standard for Canton, but had to leave in 1870 on account of the death of his mother. That same year he participated in the trial for the Tianjin Massacre. He otherwise retired for the next four years, returning to Tianjin in 1875 to conclude treaties with Japan and Peru. In response to the Japanese invasion, during the great policy debates he proposed the need for Western studies and three regional fleets worth of ironclad battleships. He was attacked by the Literati, but supported by Li and made director of the Fuzhou Arsenal and governor of Fujian three months later.

Having propounded a pro-colonial stance to the court in the past, during his term he gave much attention to Taiwan. He witnessed the first machine excavation of coal there and oversaw the installation of the first telegraph line in China. He also installed artillery at the forts and inspected the Green Standard Army, dismissing ten officers for corruption. He laid plans for commercial farming and mining, and naval base and a railway (for military purposes), which were approved by the throne, but did not receive funds. Ding tried to root out corruption in the Fujian officialdom but was continually blocked by his subordinates. Growing ill, and disillusioned with the possibility of innovation in Taiwan, he submitted his resignation, which the throne accepted in April 1878.

== Foreign Affairs and defense ==
Following Ding's resignation from the Fujian Governorship in 1878 he was called upon several times to settle cases involving foreigners. Submitting a number of memorials on foreign affairs, in 1879 he was given the titles of Foreign Affairs and Governor General of the defenses of South China, which, together with soliciting funds for the Shanxi famine, occupied him until his death in 1882. He was afforded typical posthumous honours. Ding's successor in Taiwan, Governor Liu Mingchuan, was given more financial support, and a portion of the railway was begun from 1887 to 1891. Liu's successor completed another two-thirds before it was finished in the early 1900s.

== Character ==
Strictly adhering to his own teachings, as well as Confucian custom down to the most banal detail, Professor Jonathan K. Ocko characterizes Ding as a relentlessly ambitious Confucian moralist, prudish but also upright. Although seemingly of the belief that determined men could resolve old problems in a day, Ding considered quick reform unreasonable and punishments impotent. Quoted as saying "Taoism to rule the people, Legalism the clerks", Ding nonetheless only reluctantly issued demerits, and was willing to employ unlawful practices if effective or benefiting the people, for instance, in using beggars as substitutes for runners.

A man of impetuous conviction who preferred the recognition of his superiors to their approval, Ding was easily perturbed by a disregard for his orders, and sensitive about the performance of officials he had personally appointed. If not offending his colleagues, some of Ding's sarcasm may have been lost on magistrates as confused as Ding believed.

== See also ==
- Former Residence of Ding Richang, Jieyang, Guangdong
