= Quaternary Science Reviews =

Peer-reviewed scientific journal

- Discipline: Quaternary science
- Language: English
- Edited by: C.V. Murray Wallace

Publication details
- History: 1982; 43 years ago to present
- Publisher: Elsevier
- Frequency: Biweekly
- Impact factor: 4.571 (2013)

Standard abbreviations
- ISO 4: Quat. Sci. Rev.

Indexing
- CODEN: QSREDU
- ISSN: 0277-3791
- LCCN: 82644010
- OCLC no.: 7580090

Links
- Journal homepage; Online archive

Quaternary Science Reviews is a peer-reviewed scientific journal covering quaternary science. It was established in 1982 by Pergamon Press and is currently published by Elsevier. The editor-in-chief is C.V. Murray Wallace (University of Wollongong). According to the Journal Citation Reports, the journal has a 2013 impact factor of 4.571.
